= Vindaloo =

Type of curry

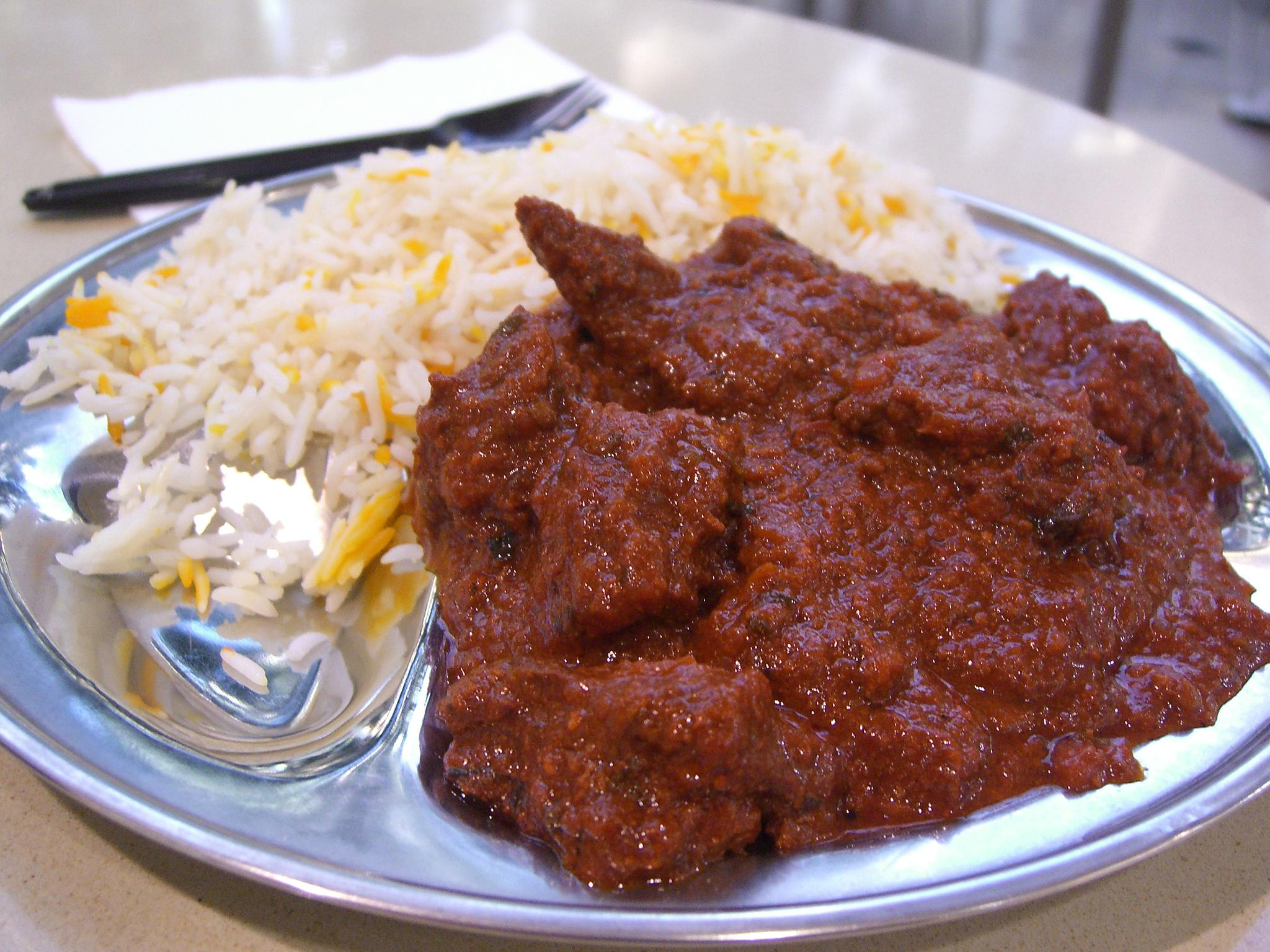
- A beef vindaloo curry, Australia, 2008
- Alternative names: Vindalho
- Type: Curry
- Course: Main course
- Place of origin: Goa, United Kingdom, Portugal
- Main ingredients: Pork or other meat, vinegar, spices, chili peppers

Vindaloo is a curry dish known globally in its British form as a staple of curry houses and Indian restaurants, specifically a fiery, spicy dish that can be made with a choice of meats. Vindaloo's name derives from the famous Portuguese Goan dish carne de vinha d'alhos (meat with garlic vinegar) or vindalho, made with pork.

From the 19th century onwards, the Portuguese-Indian dish was adapted within Anglo-Indian cuisine. The British highly prized Goan cooks, and acquired "Portuguese curry". This was initially applied to meats including beef and duck. In the 20th century, some recipes in Britain called for lemon juice in place of wine vinegar, possibly because British Muslim chefs intentionally omitted it. As a postwar British restaurant dish, vindaloo became popular as the curry to eat after pub closing time. The drunken clientele then demonstrated its machismo by ordering a specially hot curry. Fat Les's 1998 song "Vindaloo", which became a sort of football anthem, celebrates such lad culture behaviour. Potatoes are sometimes added through confusion with Hindi aloo.

== Portuguese Goan dish ==
The Portuguese founded their State of India in 1501; Goa became its capital in 1530. A standard element of Goan cuisine derived from the Portuguese carne de vinha d'alhos ("meat in garlic wine"), vindalho is a dish of pork marinated in vinegar and garlic. This was adapted by the local Goan cooks with the substitution of palm vinegar for the wine, and the addition of spices.

According to the chef Raghavan Iyer, cooks in Goa were free to use pork, a meat avoided by Hindus and Muslims in India, because they had been converted to Christianity by the Portuguese. The historian of food Lizzie Collingham writes that formerly high-caste Goans made a point of eating pork and beef as they had acquired outcaste status by becoming Christians, and accordingly had to emphasize their closeness to the Portuguese, such as by eating vindalho. Collingham writes that the Goans did not have vinegar, so the Portuguese there used sour tamarind, or made vinegar from coconut palm toddy. In addition, she states that the Portuguese liked their food extremely spicy, with up to 20 chili peppers in a recipe. Christopher Columbus found chili pepper when he sailed to Central America in 1492, and it was soon planted in the Iberian Peninsula. By 1528 at the latest, the Portuguese had introduced it to the Malabar Coast, and several varieties of it were being grown in Goa; their use quickly spread across India.

Vindaloo has, Collingham writes, become the most famous element of Goan cuisine. Traditional Goan vindalho does not include potatoes; some Indian versions add them due to the confusion with the Hindi आलू aloo, "potato".

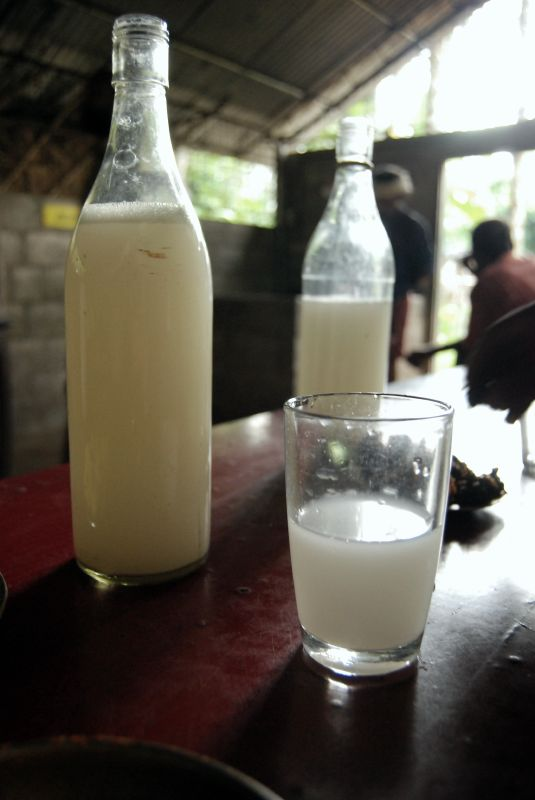
The Portuguese used coconut palm toddy (pictured) to make vinegar for their vindalho.

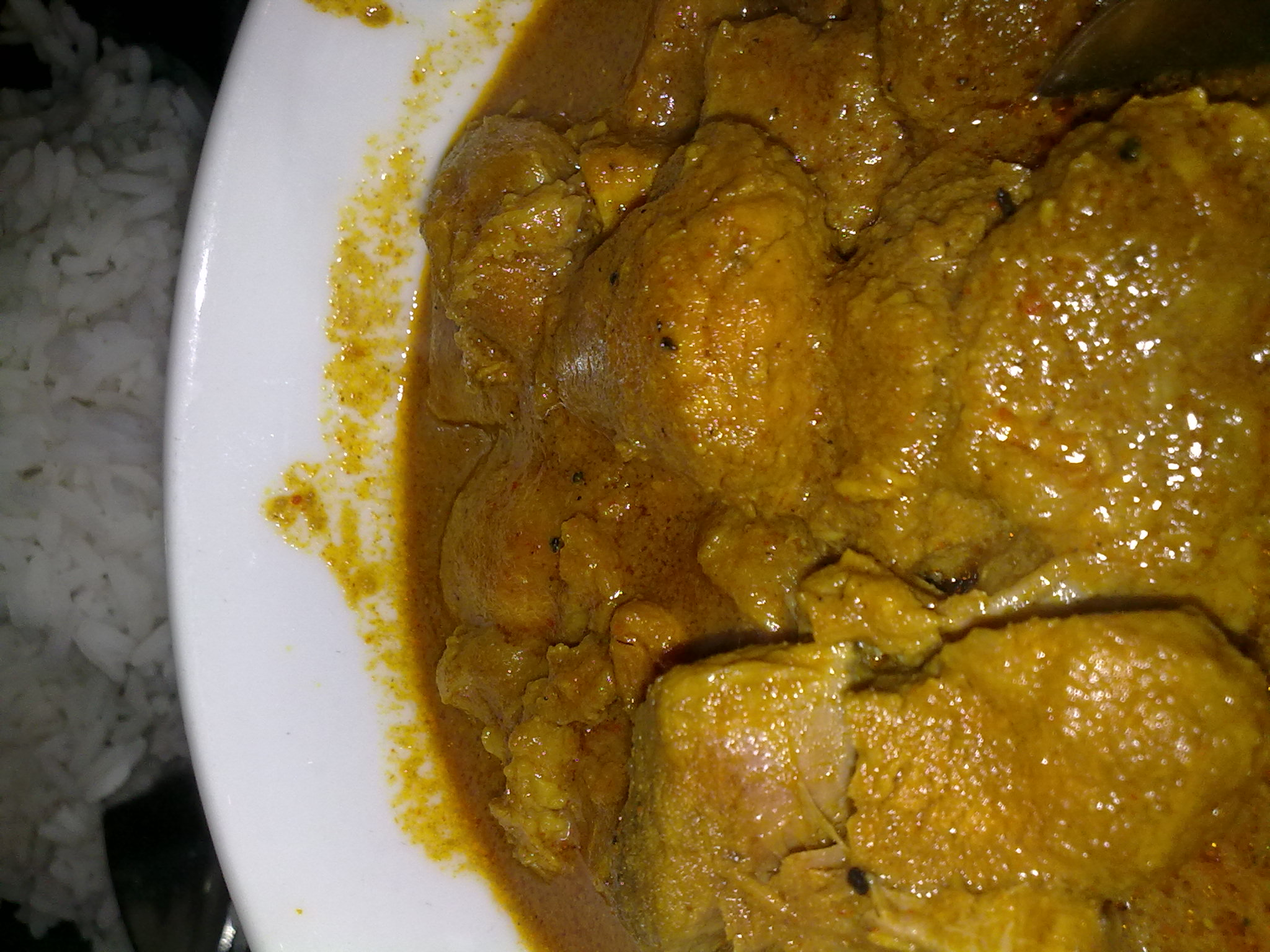
Pork vindalho in a Goan-style Indian restaurant. Lisbon, Portugal, 2011

== British dish ==
=== Origins ===
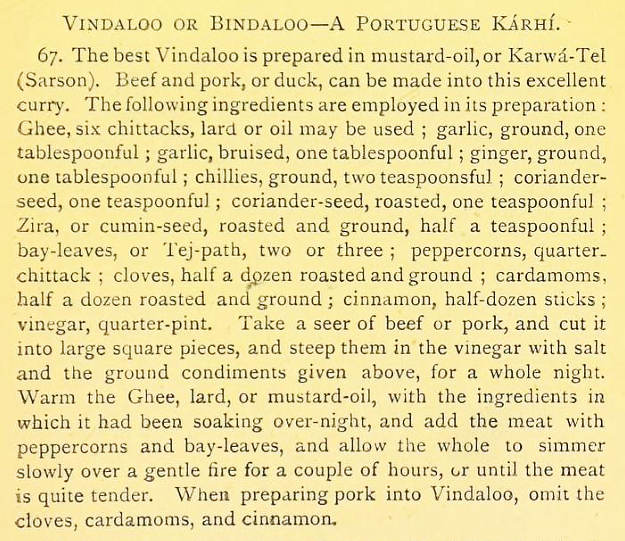
Anglo-Indian cuisine during the British Raj: "Vindaloo or Bindaloo—A Portuguese Kárhí", in The wife's help to Indian cookery, W. H. Dawe, 1888

The British highly prized Goan cooks. As a result, Anglo-Indian cuisine in the 19th century took on vindaloo or "Portuguese curry". Its method of preparation was then used for other kinds of meat, including especially duck. W. H. Dawe's 1888 cookery book, The Wife's Help to Indian Cookery, gave a recipe for "Vindaloo or Bindaloo—A Portuguese Kárhí", suggesting beef, pork, or duck as the meat. London's Veeraswamy restaurant, opened in 1926, served the same sort of British Raj food, including duck vindaloo in its early years. Vindaloo became widespread in Britain with the creation of more Indian restaurants in the 1970s.

The food writer Glyn Hughes suggests that at that time, British Muslim chefs intentionally omitted the pork and the wine vinegar called for by the Portuguese recipe, substituting chicken or beef as the meat and lemon juice for the vinegar. Iyer on the other hand gives a recipe for "British Curry House Vindaloo" which uses both vinegar and pork, along with both mild spices and "potent-hot" chili. Felicity Cloake however writes that the dish is sweet and sour rather than hot, and that the "tangy gravy works best with rich meats like duck or pork".

A variant theory, proposed by the food writer Pat Chapman, is that vindaloo served in British restaurants is not based on the Portuguese dish, but simply a version of the standard medium spicy (Madras) restaurant curry with the addition of vinegar, potatoes and plenty of chili peppers.

Evolution of Vindaloo, from Portuguese Carne de Vinha d'Alhos with pork, to Goan Vindalho with pork and chili peppers, to a fiery British curry. The Portuguese brought chili peppers to India, and Christianity which enabled the people of Goa to eat pork.

=== Restaurant curry ===
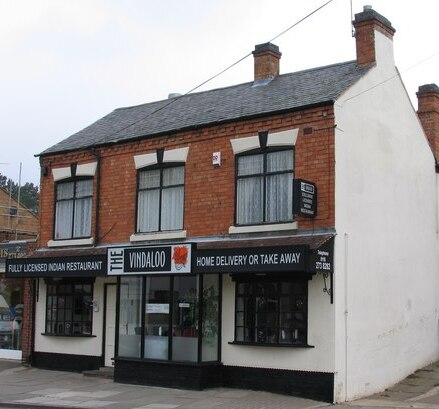
The "Vindaloo" restaurant and takeaway, Evington, Leicestershire, England, 2008

The name "vindaloo" was effectively redefined in postwar British usage to mean simply an extremely hot curry, contrasting with a mild korma. Vindaloo has indeed featured in "challenge" competitions to see who can eat such a hot curry. In Britain, vindaloo became associated with white working-class culture, as well as social rituals and tests of masculinity. Collingham writes that the habit of British Indian restaurants of the period of staying open late, after pub closing time, allowed working class Britons to discover "that a good hot vindaloo went down particularly well on a stomach full of beer", and people became accustomed to have a curry after an evening's drinking. This was accompanied in lad culture by, in Collingham's words, the "lager-loutish tradition of rolling, uproariously drunk, into an Indian restaurant and proving one's machismo by ordering the hottest vindaloo or phaal possible".

The 1998 Fat Les song "Vindaloo" is named for the curry. The actor and songwriter Keith Allen stated that the dish was appropriate for the sort of song that a "right-wing lout" would like. Whatever the reasons for its composition, it became something of a England football fan anthem during the 1998 World Cup.

=== International dish ===
From Britain, vindaloo became international. In 2010, the "Vindaloo against Violence" campaign invited Australians to share a curry in a "stand against racial intolerance", which had included attacks on Indian students there. The dish was introduced to Hong Kong when it was a British colony. In 2020, the food and beverage manager of the region's Aberdeen Boat Club described vindaloo as one of its most commonly ordered dishes. Pork vindaloo can according to the Guide Michelin be found in restaurants in Tokyo, Japan. The Swedish meat organisation Svenskt Kött proposes "Vindaloo – Indian stew with lamb shoulder" on its website.

A study of Indian food in America found that restaurants could offer dishes like Goan Spiced Maine Crab Cake, which it described as "a far cry" from standard pork vindaloo as "differentiated restaurants [break] new ground".

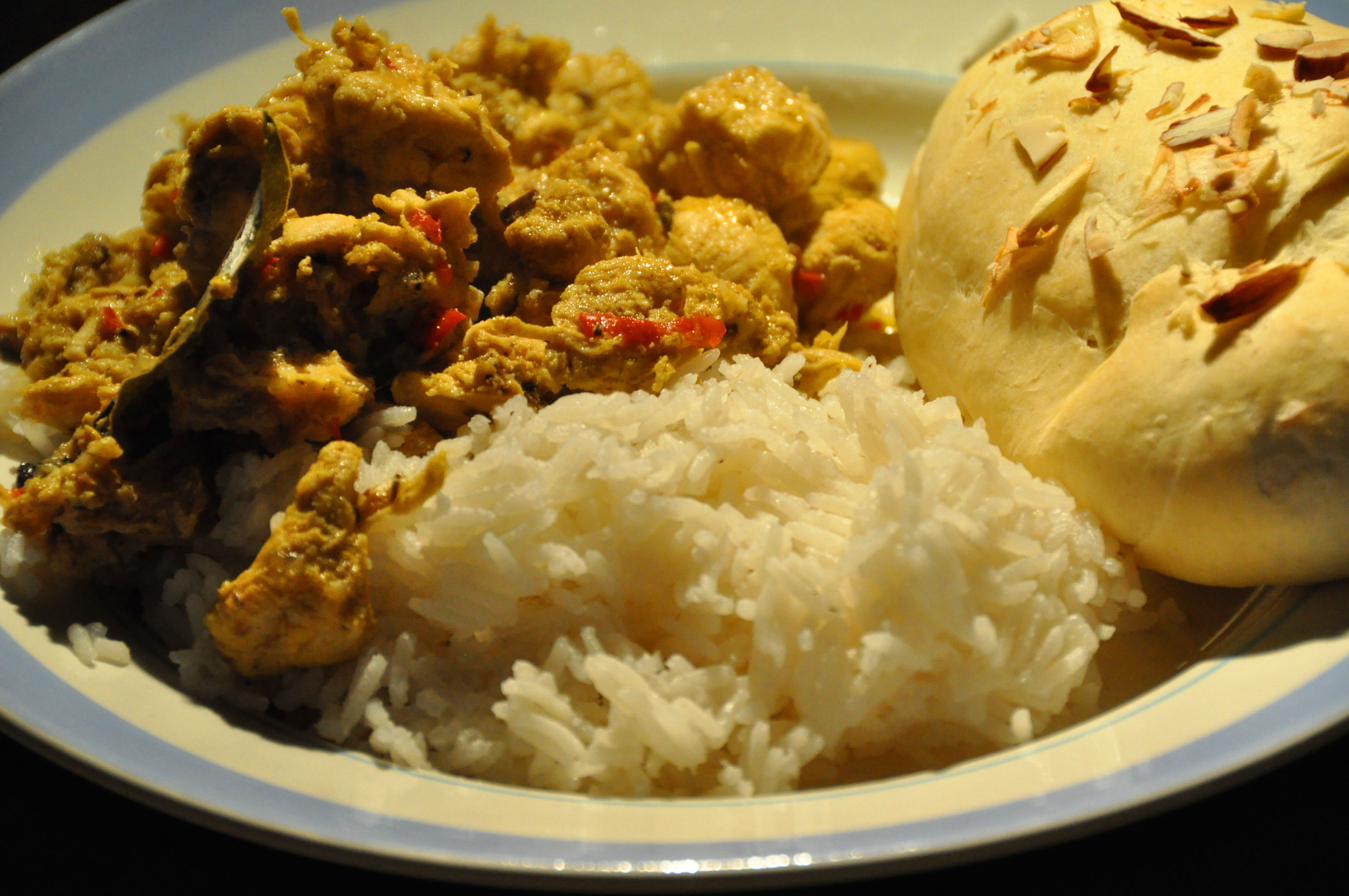
Chicken vindaloo, Copenhagen, Denmark, 2009

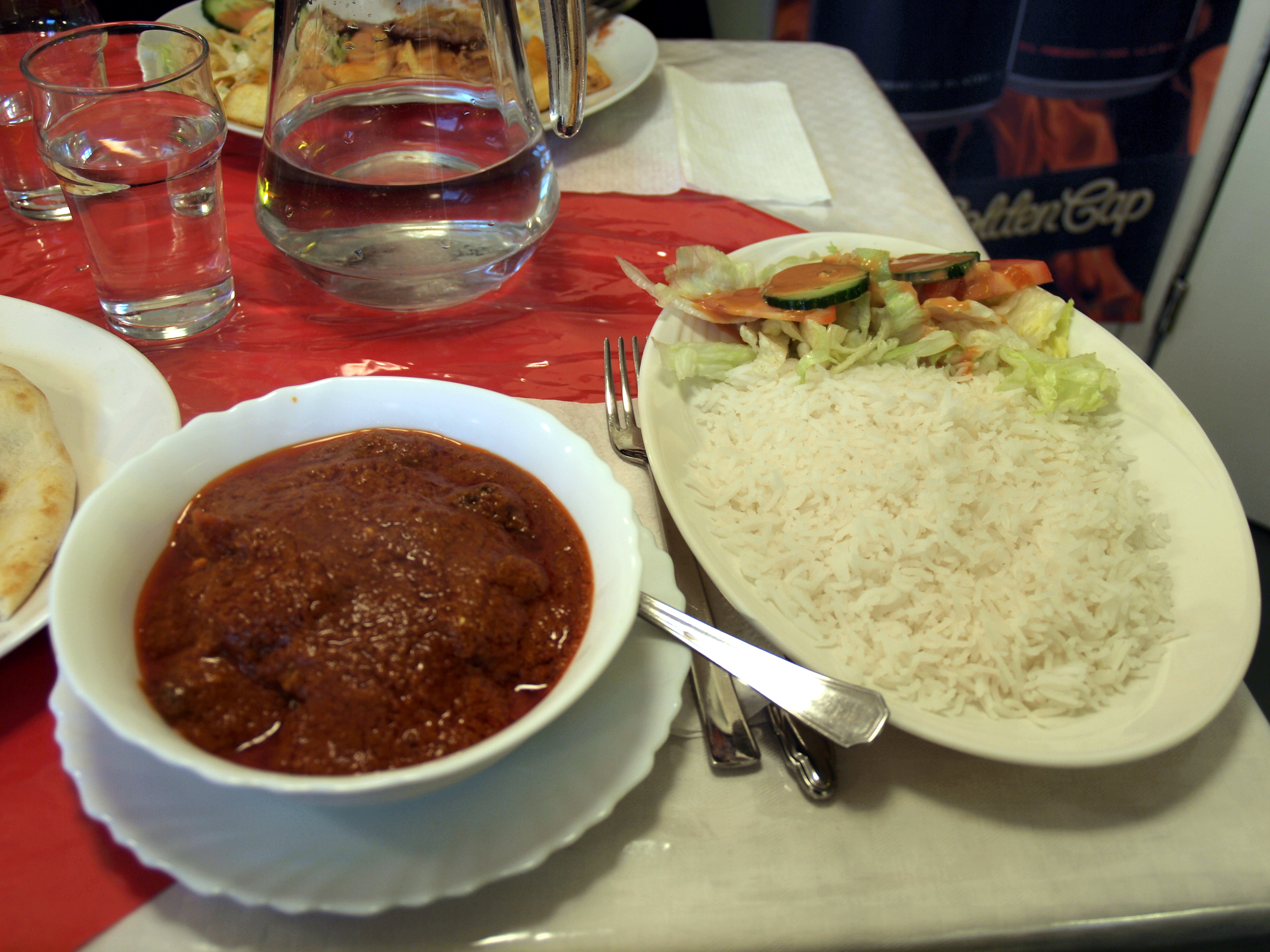
Lamb vindaloo, Helsinki, Finland, 2011

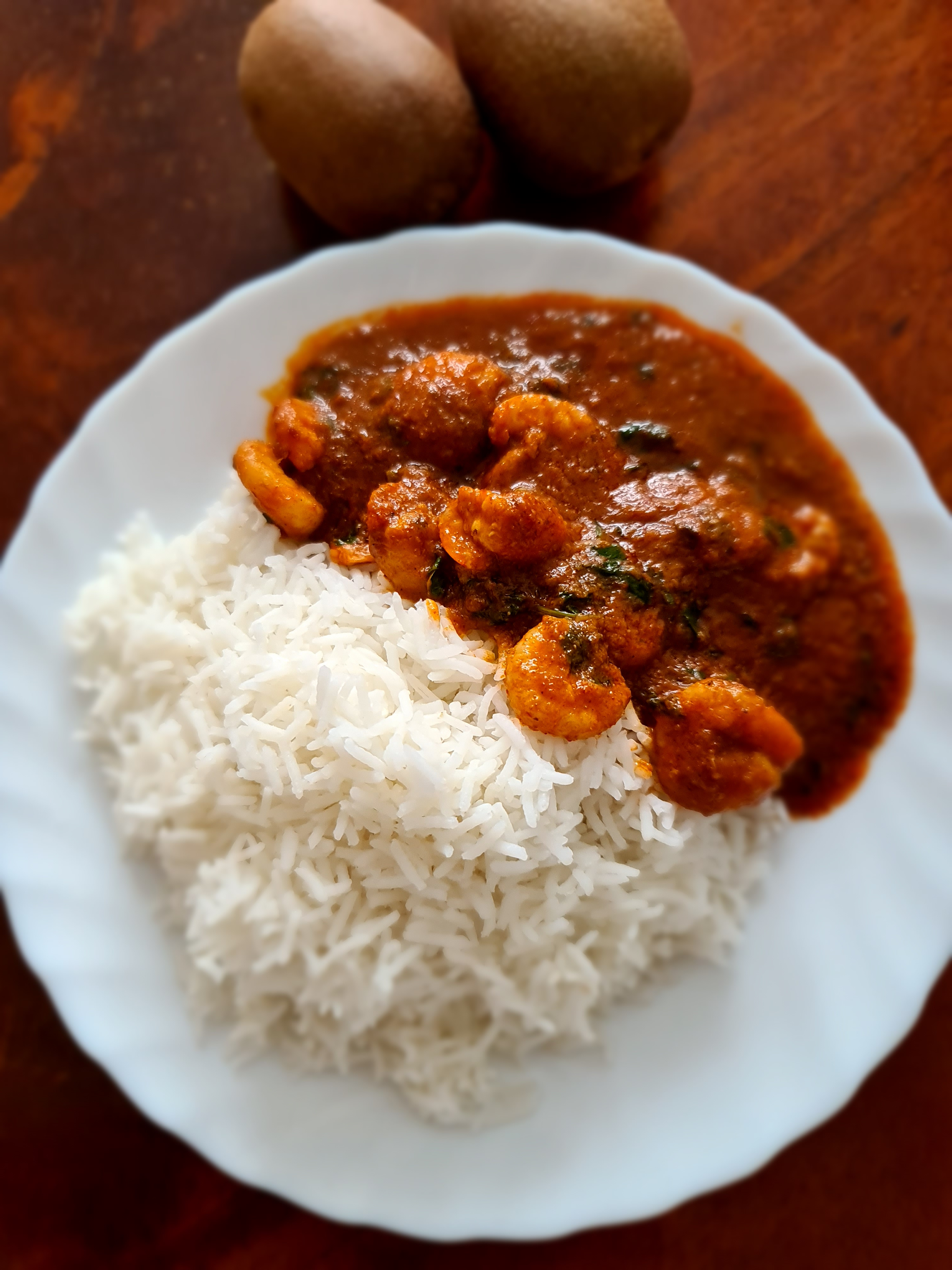
Prawn vindaloo, Göttingen, Germany, 2021

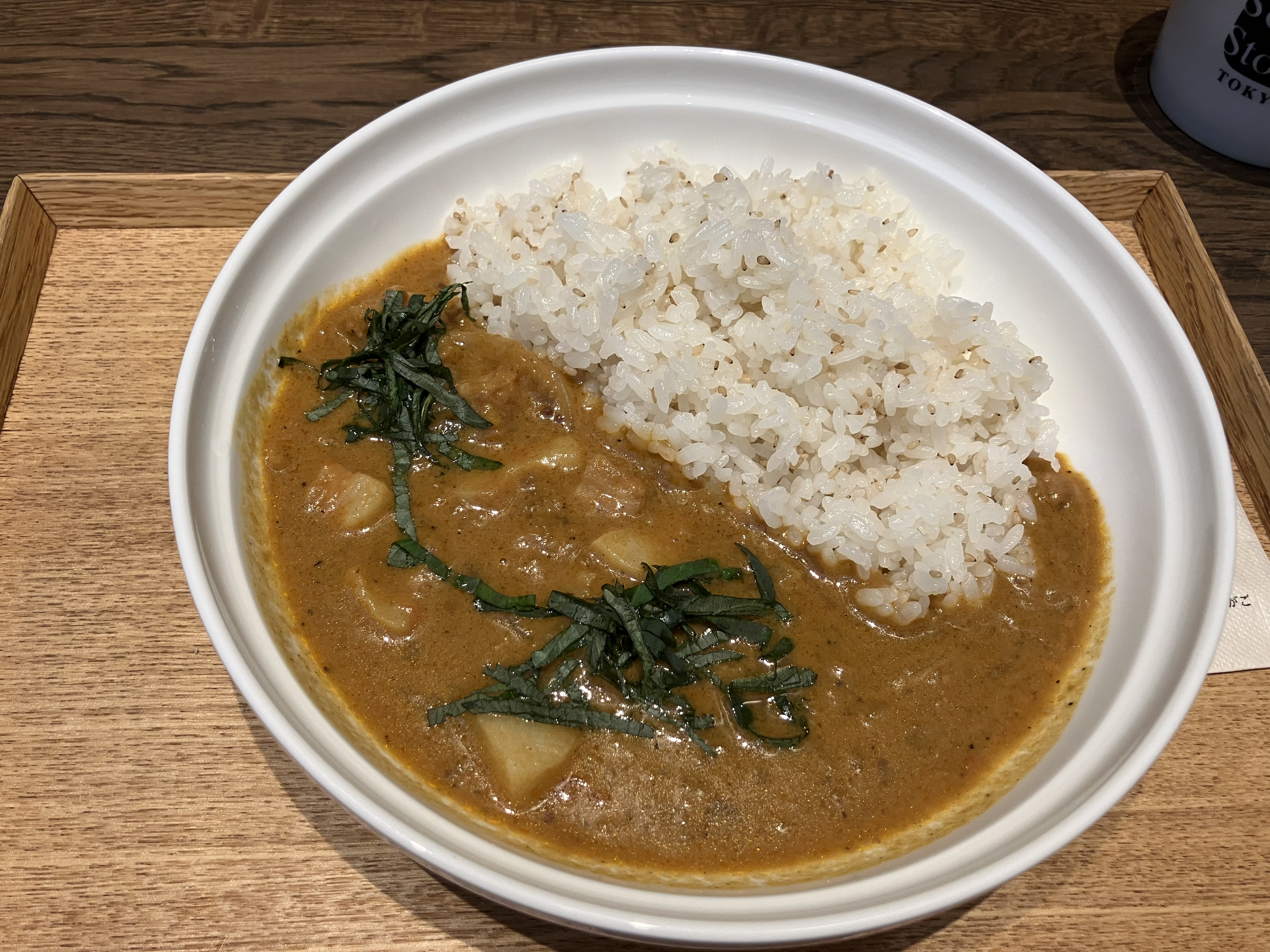
Vindalho, Tokyo, Japan, 2025

== Sources ==
- Chapman, Pat (2004). The New Curry Bible. London, UK: Metro Publishing. ISBN 978-1-84358-087-4.
- Collingham, Elizabeth M. (2006). Curry: A Tale of Cooks and Conquerors. Oxford University Press. ISBN 0-19-517241-8.
- Iyer, Raghavan (2022). On the Curry Trail: Chasing the Flavor That Seduced the World. New York: Workman Publishing. ISBN 978-1523511211. OCLC 1374192575.
