= Curry =

Spiced Asian-inspired sauces and dishes

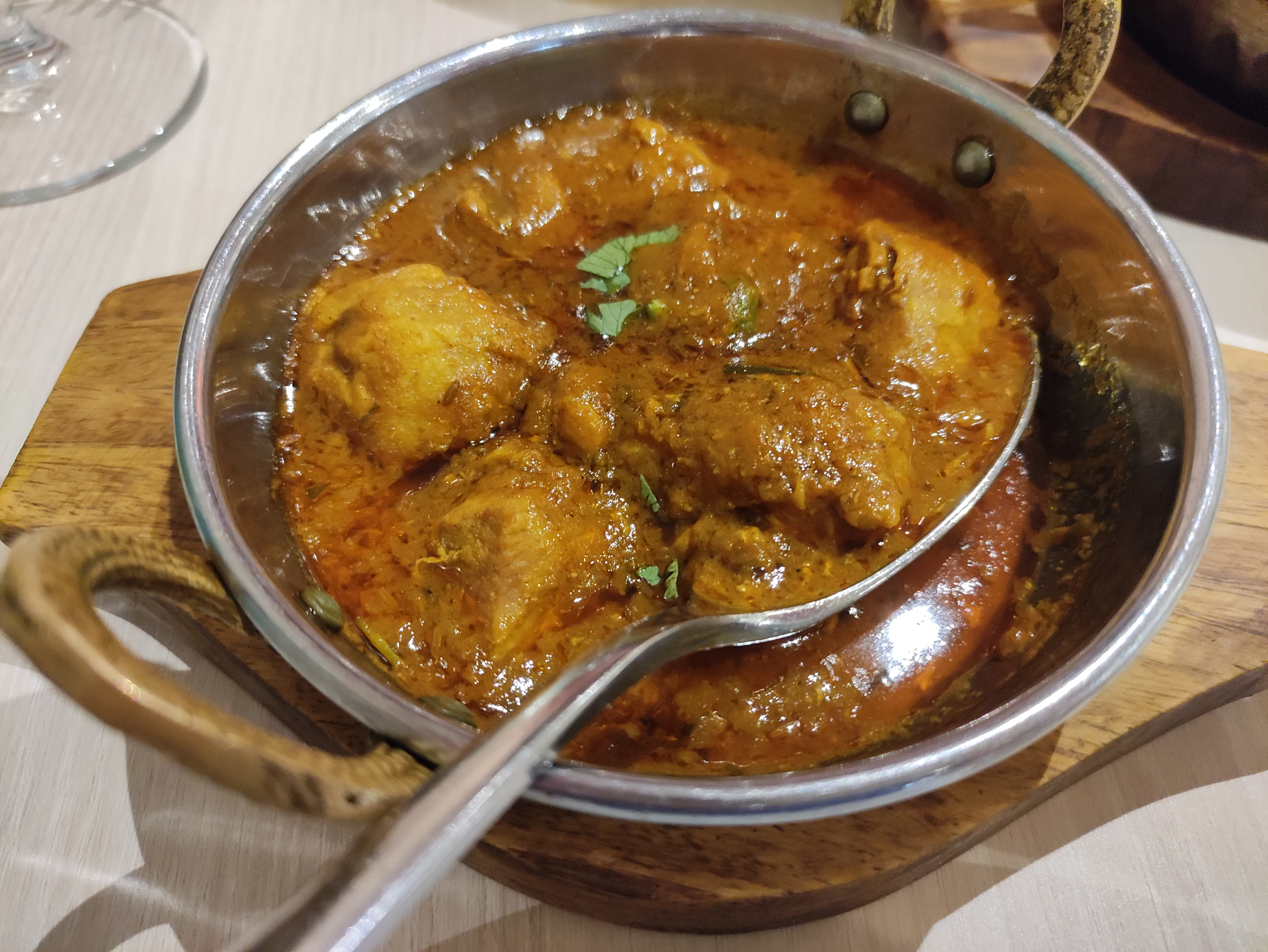
Lamb Madras curry, Anglo-Indian

Curry (English: /kʌɹiː/, Tamil: [kɐri]) is a dish with a spicy sauce, initially in Indian cuisine, then modified by interchange with the Portuguese, followed by the British, and eventually thoroughly internationalised. Many curries are found in the cuisines of countries in Southeast Asia and East Asia.

In medieval India, proto-curries were flavoured with mild spices such as asafoetida, cardamom, coriander, cumin, and ginger, with the limited heat of black pepper. A definite step in the development of modern curry was the arrival in India of spicy hot chili peppers, along with ingredients such as tomatoes and potatoes, part of the Columbian exchange of plants between the Old World and the New World. The Mughal Empire brought new subtly-spiced dishes, especially to the north of India. During the British Raj, Anglo-Indian cuisine developed, leading to Hannah Glasse's 18th century recipe for "currey the India way" in England. Curry was then spread in the 19th century by indentured Indian sugar workers to the Caribbean and by British traders to Japan. Further exchanges around the world made curry a fully international dish.

Many types of curry exist in different countries. In Southeast Asia, curry often contains a spice paste and coconut milk. In India, the spices are fried in oil or ghee to create a paste, which may be combined with a water-based broth or, at times, milk or coconut milk. In China and Korea, curries are based on a commercial curry powder. Curry restaurants outside their native countries often adapt their cuisine to suit local tastes. In Britain, curry is a popular dish with some types adopted from India and others modified or invented.

== Etymology ==
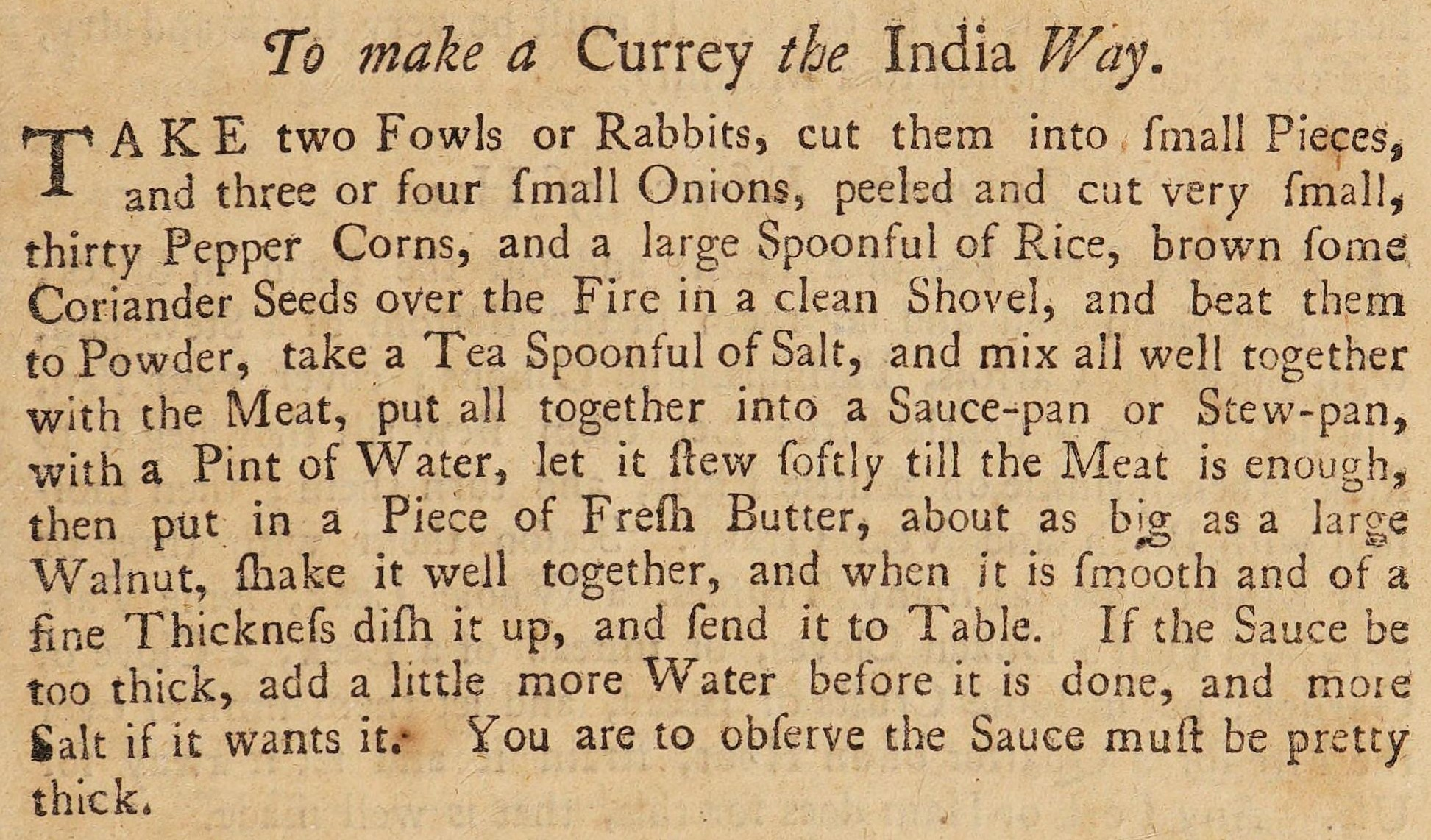
Hannah Glasse's recipe for "Currey the India Way", first published in her 1747 book The Art of Cookery Made Plain and Easy. It is the first known use of the word in English (the recipe uses the long s, "ſ").

The English word "curry" is derived from the Dravidian language family, possibly by way of Dutch carrijl, Portuguese caris or caril, or some combination of these. The Dravidian source may be Tamil கறி kaṟi, ("a spiced mixture with fish, meat or vegetable, eaten with boiled rice"), or a mingled borrowing from multiple Dravidian languages. Other Dravidian languages such as Malayalam (കറി kari, "hot condiments; meats, vegetables"), Middle Kannada and Kodava have similar words.

Kaṟi is described in a 17th-century Portuguese cookbook, based on trade with Tamil merchants along the Coromandel Coast of southeast India, becoming known as a "spice blend... called kari podi or curry powder". The first appearance in its anglicised form (spelt currey) was in Hannah Glasse's 1747 book The Art of Cookery Made Plain and Easy.

The term "curry" is not derived from the name of the curry tree, although some curries do include curry leaves among many other spices. The cookery writer Pat Chapman noted the similarity of the words Karahi or Kadai, an Indian cooking dish shaped like a wok, without giving evidence. "Curry" is not related to the word cury in The Forme of Cury, a 1390s English cookbook; that term comes from the Middle French word cuire, meaning "to cook".

== Cultural exchanges ==
=== Ancient spice trade in Asia ===
Curry timeline of cultural exchanges
Date	From	To	Activity/foods
c. 5000 BCE	Austronesia	S & SE Asia	Ancient spice trade
c. 1400	India		Asafoetida, mild spices
c. 1500	Persia	India	Mughlai cuisine, mild spices
after 1492	MesoAmerica	India	Chili, tomato, potato, etc.
c. 1600	Indian regions		Many spicy dishes, not then called curries
1747	India	England	Anglo-Indian "currey"
c. 1850	Indian regions	Pan-India	Standardised Anglo-Indian cuisine, spice mixes
c. 1850	India	Caribbean	Sugar workers' curry
1868	India	Japan	British traders' curry
1886	Japan	Singapore	Simplified curry
c. 1950	Bangladesh	UK	British restaurant cuisine
c. 2000	India	S. Africa	Migrants' curry, bunny chow

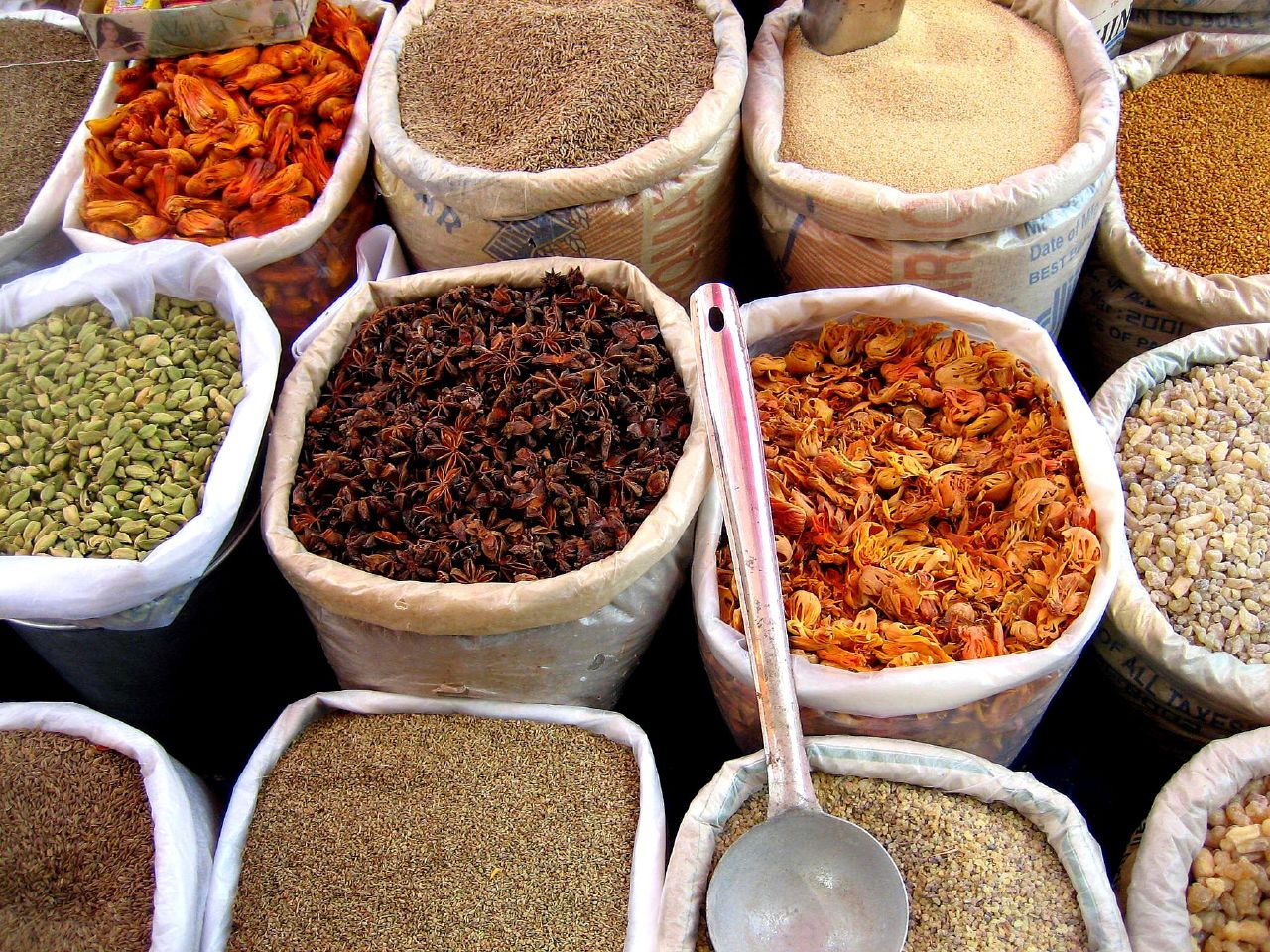
Spices on sale in Goa, Western India

By 1500 BCE, seafaring merchants from Austronesian communities were already trading spices across the ocean. They sailed between South Asia and East Asia, especially the ports along southeastern India and Sri Lanka, creating some of the world's earliest maritime trade networks. Archaeological discoveries at Mohenjo-daro show that people were using mortar and pestle to grind spices as early as 2600 BCE. They pounded cumin, fennel, garlic, ginger, mustard, black peppercorns, saffron, sesame seed, tamarind pods, and turmeric to create spicy flavourings for their food, which included meat, fish, grains, pulses, and fruits. Black pepper is native to the Indian subcontinent and Southeast Asia and has been known to Indian cooking since at least 2000 BCE. The three basic ingredients of the spicy stew were ginger, garlic, and turmeric. Using starch grain analysis, archaeologists identified the residue of these spices in both skeletons and pottery shards from excavations in India, finding that turmeric and ginger were present, in what have been called "proto-curries". Sauces in India before Columbus could contain black pepper or long pepper to provide a little heat, but not chili, so they were not spicy hot by modern standards.

=== Medieval Indian proto-curries ===
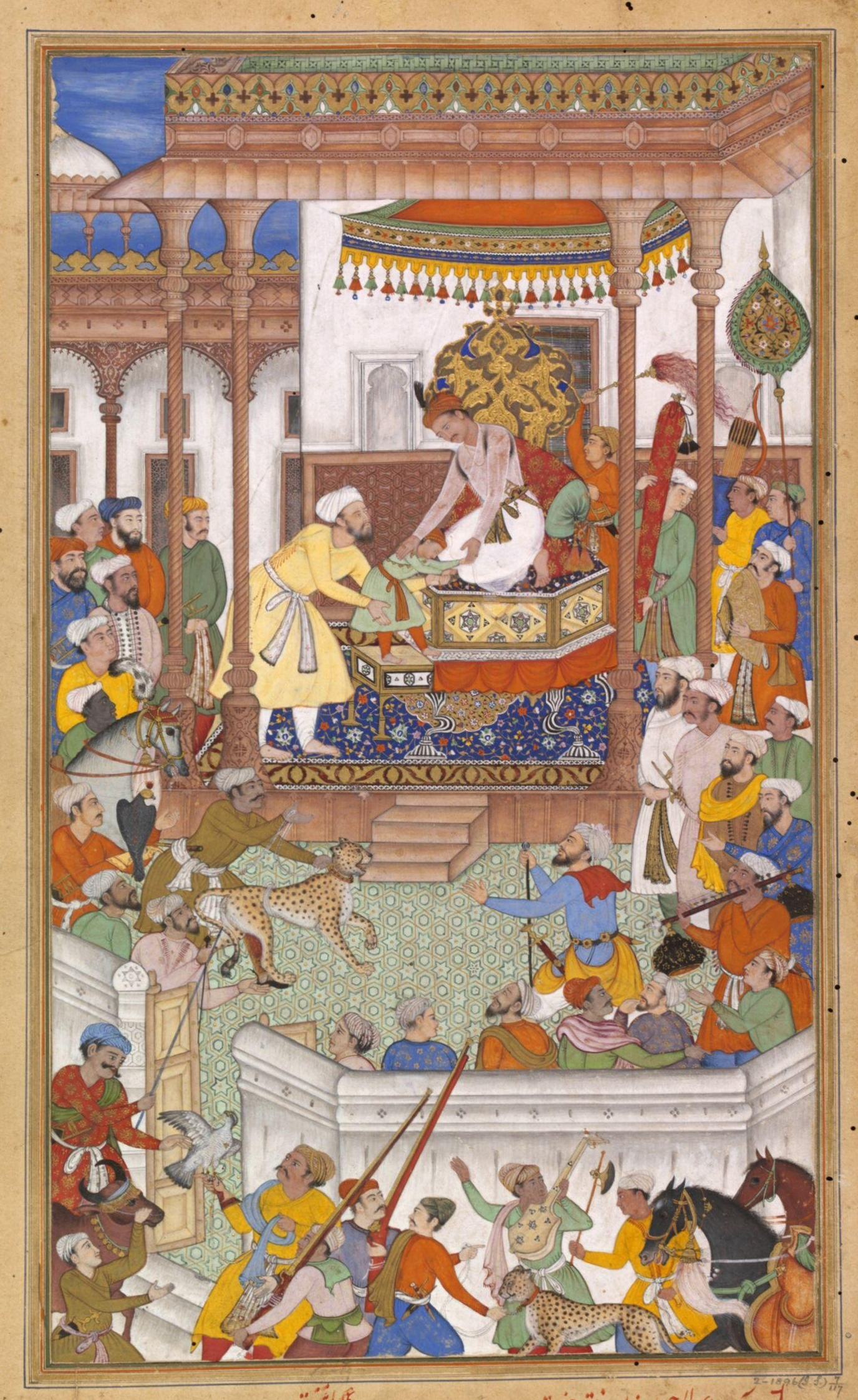
The 16th century Mughal court of the emperor Akbar ate mild proto-curries, flavoured with asafoetida and spices such as cardamom and ginger.

Before Christopher Columbus, Indian dishes were sometimes spicy but they were never hot like many modern curries, as chili peppers were absent, along with tomatoes, potatoes, bell peppers and squashes. The proto-curries of medieval pre-Columbian India were diverse but not much like modern international curries. Sambar, for example, was a dish of pigeon peas (toor dal) or lentils, flavoured with onions and mild spices. Among the key spices used in the period was asafoetida (hīng), a foul-smelling gum from plants of the genus Ferula. Despite its smell, it adds a fine-tasting meaty flavour when it is fried in oil.

Chavundaraya II's 11th century Lokopakara makes use of asafoetida, cumin, curry tree leaves, and mustard to flavour a dal. Spices named in the 12th century Mānasollāsa from the Western Chalukya Empire of South India include coriander, cumin, asafoetida, salt, and black pepper. The 15th century Ni'matnāmah Naṣir al-Dīn Shāhī from the Malwa Sultanate of Northern India describes flavouring vegetables with asafoetida and sesame seeds fried in ghee (clarified butter), with lime juice and salt.

=== Early modern trade ===
Origin and spread of curry around the world. Mild spices were traded between India and East Asia by 1500 BCE. The Columbian Exchange brought chili peppers to India; before then, Indian food was not spicy hot. Anglo-Indian food came to Britain in the 17th century. The word "curry" was first recorded in print in Hannah Glasse's 1747 English cookery book. In the 19th century, curry spread to the Caribbean and to Japan, and from there to Chinese people, starting in Singapore. Further migration and globalisation (not shown) made curry a fully international dish.

The establishment of the Mughal Empire, in the early 16th century, brought some new and subtly spiced dishes, especially in the north. The Indo-Persian Mughal cuisine of the emperor Akbar, as described in the Ain-i-Akbari, could cook aubergines (eggplants) with asafoetida, cardamom, cloves, coriander, ginger, lime juice, onions, and pepper. The cuisine established dishes like biryani in India, derived from Persian pilau rice and the Persian habit of marinading meat in yoghurt (curd), combined with Indian-style use of spices.

Another influence was the establishment of the Portuguese trading centre in Goa in 1510, resulting in the introduction of chili peppers, tomatoes and potatoes to India from the Americas, as a byproduct of the Columbian Exchange. The food culture scholar Lizzie Collingham suggests that the Portuguese in Goa (in West India) heard and adopted words adopted into a local language from the Dravidian words from South India, becoming caril or carree as transcribed by British travellers of the time. This eventually led to the modern meaning of "curry" as a dish, often spiced, in a sauce or gravy. In 1598, an English translation of a Dutch book about travel in the East Indies mentioned a "somewhat sour" broth called Carriel, eaten with rice. The later Dutch word karie was used in the Dutch East Indies from the 19th century; many Indians had by then migrated to Southeast Asia.

=== British influence ===
Anglo-Indian cooks created what they called curry by selecting regional ingredients from all over British India, using these in Indian dishes from other regions. Among their creations were kedgeree and Madras curry, served with chutneys, pickles, Bombay duck, and poppadoms.

Curry was introduced to English cuisine from Anglo-Indian cooking in the 17th century, as spicy sauces were added to plain boiled and cooked meats. That cuisine was created in the British Raj when British wives or memsahibs instructed Indian cooks on the food they wanted, transforming many dishes in the process. Further, in the late 18th and early 19th centuries, when there were few British women in India, British men often lived with Indian mistresses, acquiring the local customs, language, and food. Curry was first served in coffee houses in Britain from 1809.

Indian cooks in the 19th century prepared curries for their British masters simplified and adjusted to Anglo-Indian taste. For instance, a quarama from Lucknow contained (among other ingredients) ghee, yoghurt, cream, crushed almonds, cloves, cardamom, and saffron; whereas an 1869 Anglo-Indian quorema or korma, "different in substance as well as name", had no cream, almonds, or saffron, but it added the then-standard British curry spices, namely coriander, ginger, and black peppercorns. Curry, initially understood as "an unfamiliar set of Indian stews and ragouts", had become "a dish in its own right, created for the British in India". Collingham describes the resulting Anglo-Indian cuisine as "eclectic", "pan-Indian", "lacking sophistication", embodying a "passion for garnishes", and forming a "coherent repertoire"; but it was eaten only by the British. Collingham writes that "The idea of a curry is, in fact, a concept that the Europeans imposed on India's food culture. Indians referred to their different dishes by specific names... But the British lumped all these together under the heading of curry."

Elsewhere in the 19th century, curry was carried to the Caribbean by Indian indentured workers in the British sugar industry.

=== Globalisation ===
Since the mid-20th century, curries of many national styles have become popular far from their origins, and increasingly become part of international fusion cuisine. Alan Davidson writes that curry's worldwide extension is a result of the Indian diaspora and globalisation, starting within the British Empire, and followed by economic migrants who brought Indian cuisine to many countries. In 1886, 咖喱 (Gālí) (Chinese pronunciation of "curry") appeared among the Chinese in Singapore. Malay Chinese people then most likely brought curry to China.

In India, spices are always freshly prepared for use in curries. Derived from such mixtures (but not containing curry leaves), curry powder is a ready-prepared spice blend first sold by Indian merchants to European colonial traders. This was commercially available from the late 18th century, with brands such as Crosse & Blackwell and Sharwood's persisting to the present. Curry powder became a standard item in Anglo-Indian cuisine. British traders introduced the powder to Meiji-era Japan, in the mid-19th century, where it was used to make Japanese curry, known as カレー, karē.

== Types ==
There are many varieties of curry. The choice of spices for each dish in traditional cuisine depends on regional cultural traditions and personal preferences. Such dishes have names such as dopiaza and rogan josh that refer to their ingredients, spicing, and cooking methods. Outside the Indian subcontinent, a curry is a dish from Southeast Asia which uses coconut milk and spice pastes, and is commonly eaten over rice. Curries may contain fish, meat, poultry, or shellfish, either alone or in combination with vegetables. Others are vegetarian. A masala mixture is a combination of dried or dry-roasted spices commonly homemade for some curries.

Curry powder, a commercially prepared mixture of spices marketed in the West, was first exported to Britain in the 18th century when Indian merchants sold a concoction of spices, similar to garam masala, to the British East India Company returning to Britain. Other commercial mixes include curry pastes and Japanese-style curry roux (in block or powder form).

Ways curries can vary
Type of variation	From	To
Mild ↔ Hot	Korma (aromatic spices (Note: Korma can be made with flavourings such as cloves, ginger, cardamom, cumin, coriander, turmeric, bay, onion and garlic.))	Madras (chili)
Watery ↔ Creamy	Rogan josh (broth)	Korma (yoghurt or cream)
Dry ↔ Wet	Tikka (skewered meat, spices)	Tikka masala (tomato, cream)
Sour ↔ Sweet	Dopiaza (onion, lemon)	Pasanda (almonds, sugar)
Stir-fry ↔ Simmer	Balti (oil, onion, potato)	Dhansak (lentils, spices, tomato)

== By region ==
=== East Asia ===
Japanese curry is usually eaten as karē raisu （カレーライス ）– curry, rice, and often pickled vegetables, served on the same plate and eaten with a spoon, a common lunchtime canteen dish. It is less spicy and seasoned than Indian and Southeast Asian curries, being more of a thick stew than a curry. British people brought curry from the Indian colony back to Britain and introduced it to Japan during the Meiji period (1868 to 1912), after Japan ended its policy of national self-isolation (sakoku), and curry in Japan was categorised as a Western dish. Its spread across the country is attributed to its use in the Japanese Army and Navy which adopted it extensively as convenient field and naval canteen cooking, allowing even conscripts from the remotest countryside to experience the dish. The Japan Maritime Self-Defense Force traditionally have curry every Friday for lunch and many ships have their own recipes. The standard Japanese curry contains onions, carrots, potatoes, and sometimes celery, and a meat that is cooked in a large pot. Sometimes grated apples or honey are added for additional sweetness and other vegetables are sometimes used instead.

In 1905, curry became affordable for the general population of Japan with the introduction of domestically produced curry powder. In the 1920s, the predecessors of today's well-known S&B Foods and House Foods began selling powdered curry powder. In the early 1900s, restaurants created various derivatives of curry rice. The first curry udon and curry soba were made in Tokyo or Osaka in 1904 or 1909. Curry udon and curry soba are made by soaking katsuobushi (dried bonito flakes) in boiling water to dissolve the umami components, adding curry to the broth, and then adding potato starch to thicken the broth and pour it over the udon or soba. The first curry bread (karē pan) was introduced in 1927, and the first katsu curry in 1918 or 1921 or 1948. In 1945, the Oriental company developed a powdered instant curry roux, and in 1950, Bell Shokuhin company developed a block-shaped instant curry roux, and Japanese curry quickly spread throughout Japan as a dish that could be easily prepared at home. In 1948, Japanese curry was used in school meals for the first time. In 1963, House Foods introduced "Vermont Curry" (バーモントカレー), an instant curry roux made with apples and honey, which became popular. This product brought sweetness to Japanese curry, which had been perceived as a spicy, adult dish, and made Japanese curry a favourite children's dish.

Curry spread to other regions of Asia. Curry powder is added to some dishes in the southern part of China. The curry powder sold in Chinese grocery stores is similar to Madras curry powder, but with the addition of star anise and cinnamon. The former Portuguese colony of Macau has its own culinary traditions and curry dishes, including Galinha à portuguesa ("Portuguese-style chicken") and curry crab. Portuguese sauce is a sauce flavoured with curry and thickened with coconut milk.

Curry was popularized in Korean cuisine when Ottogi entered the Korean food industry with an imported curry powder in 1969. Korean curry powder contains spices including cardamom, chili, cinnamon, and turmeric. Curry tteokbokki is made of tteok (rice cakes), eomuk (fish cakes), eggs, vegetables, and gochujang, fermented red chili paste. As in India, chilis were brought to Korea by European traders. Spicy chili sauce then replaced the soy sauce formerly used in tteokbokki.

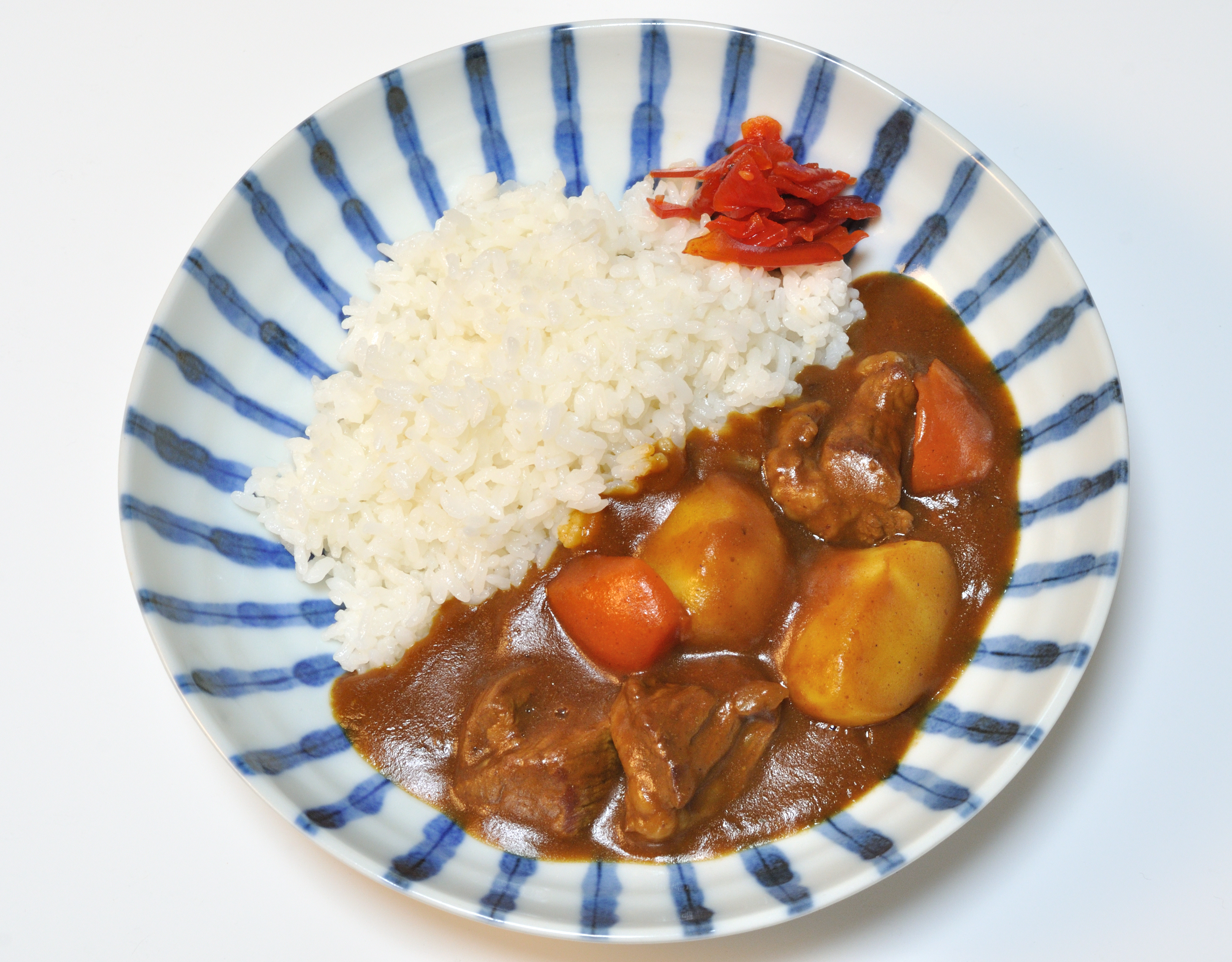
Japanese style karē-raisu
(curry rice)

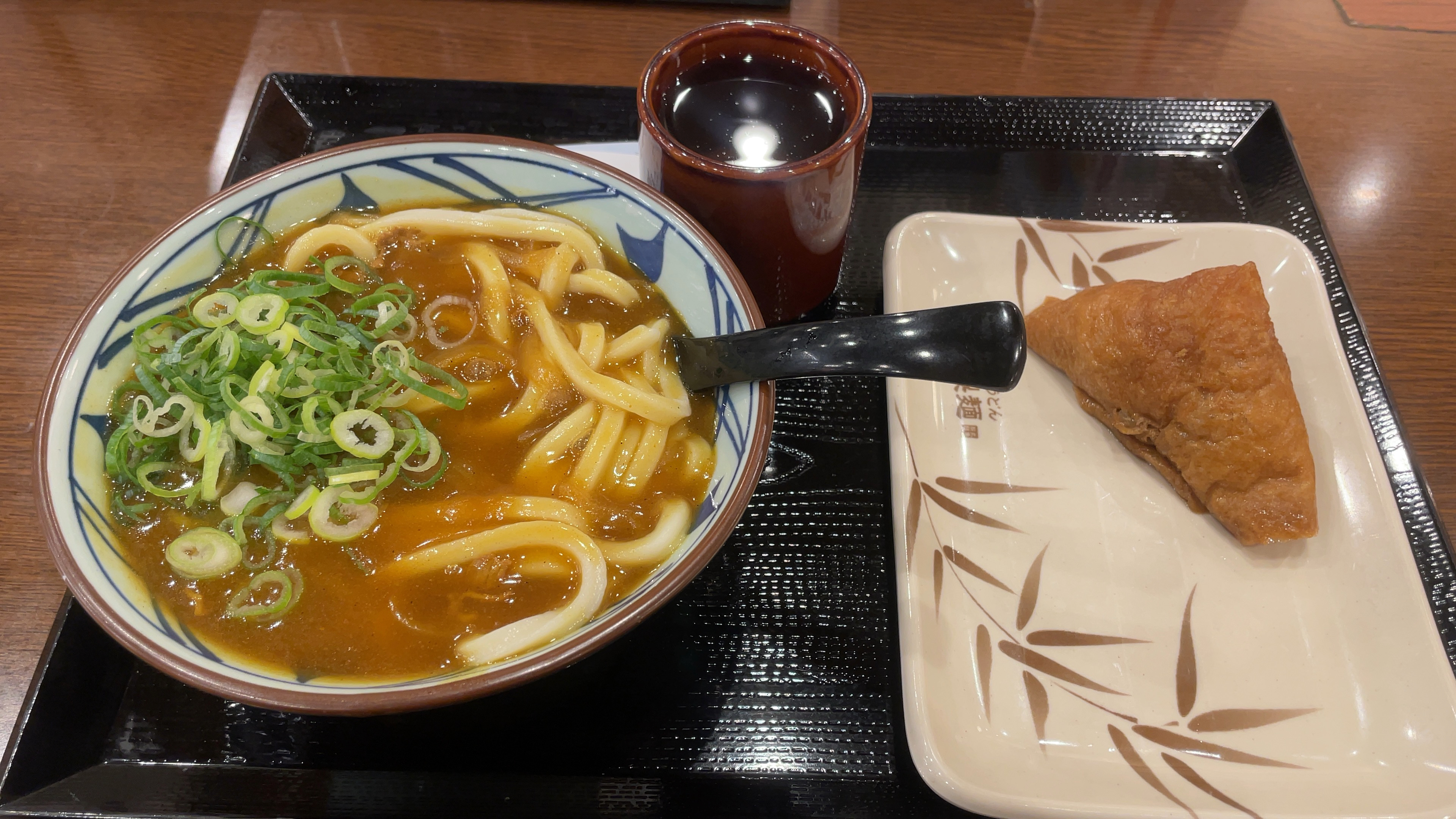
Curry udon and inari-zushi

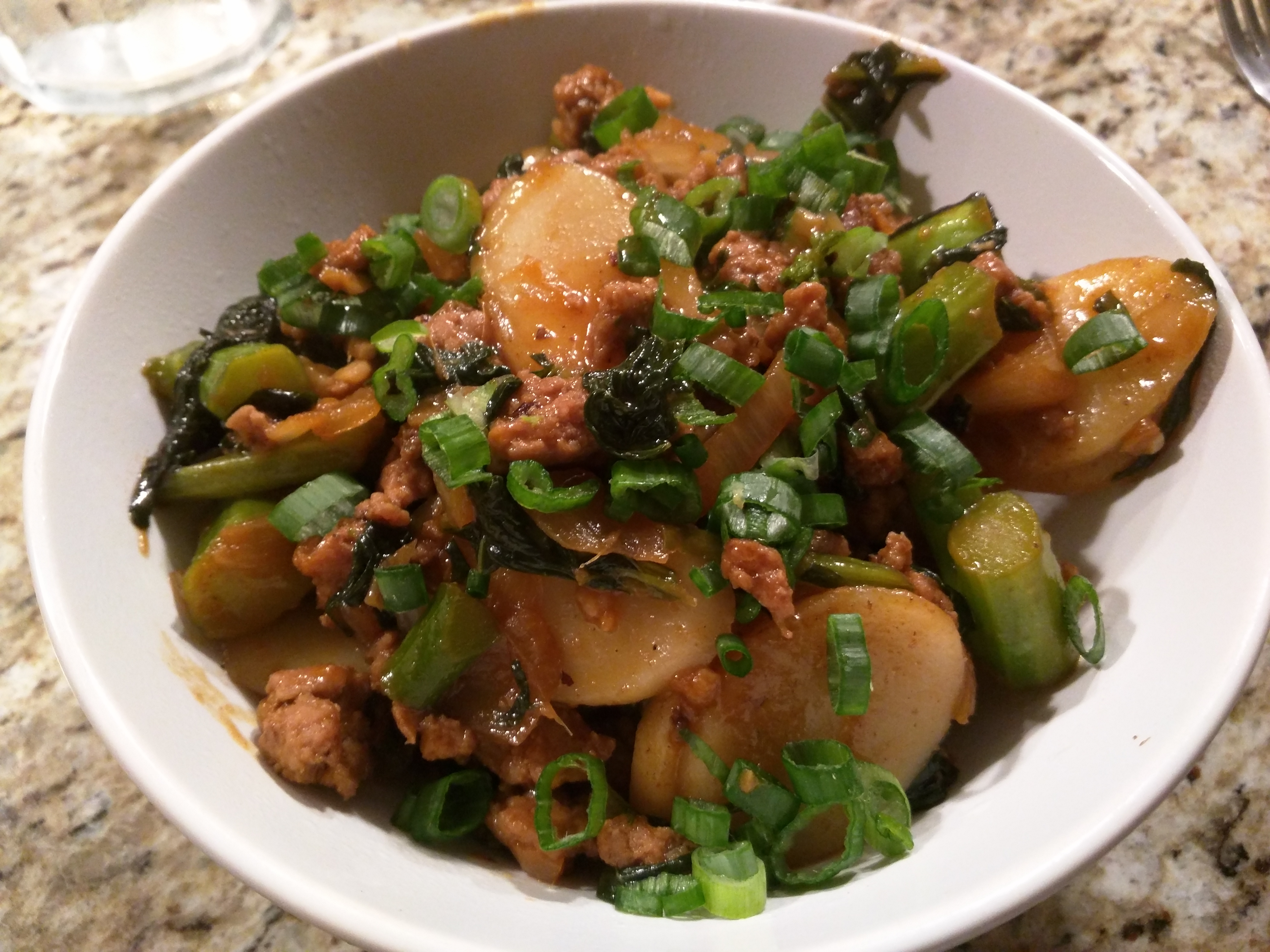
Korean tteokbokki
(rice cake curry)

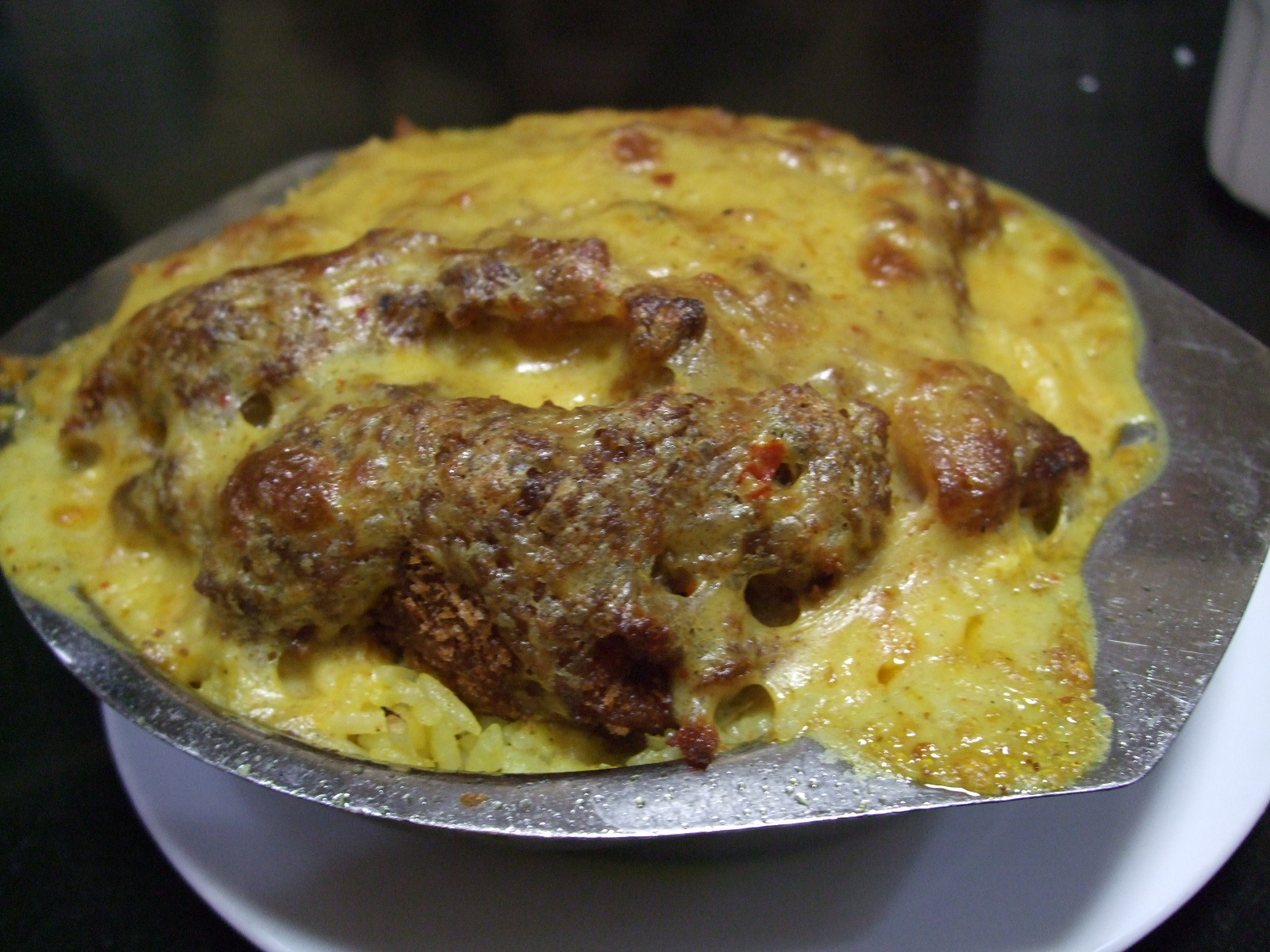
Macau's Galinha à portuguesa
(chicken in portuguese sauce)

=== South Africa ===
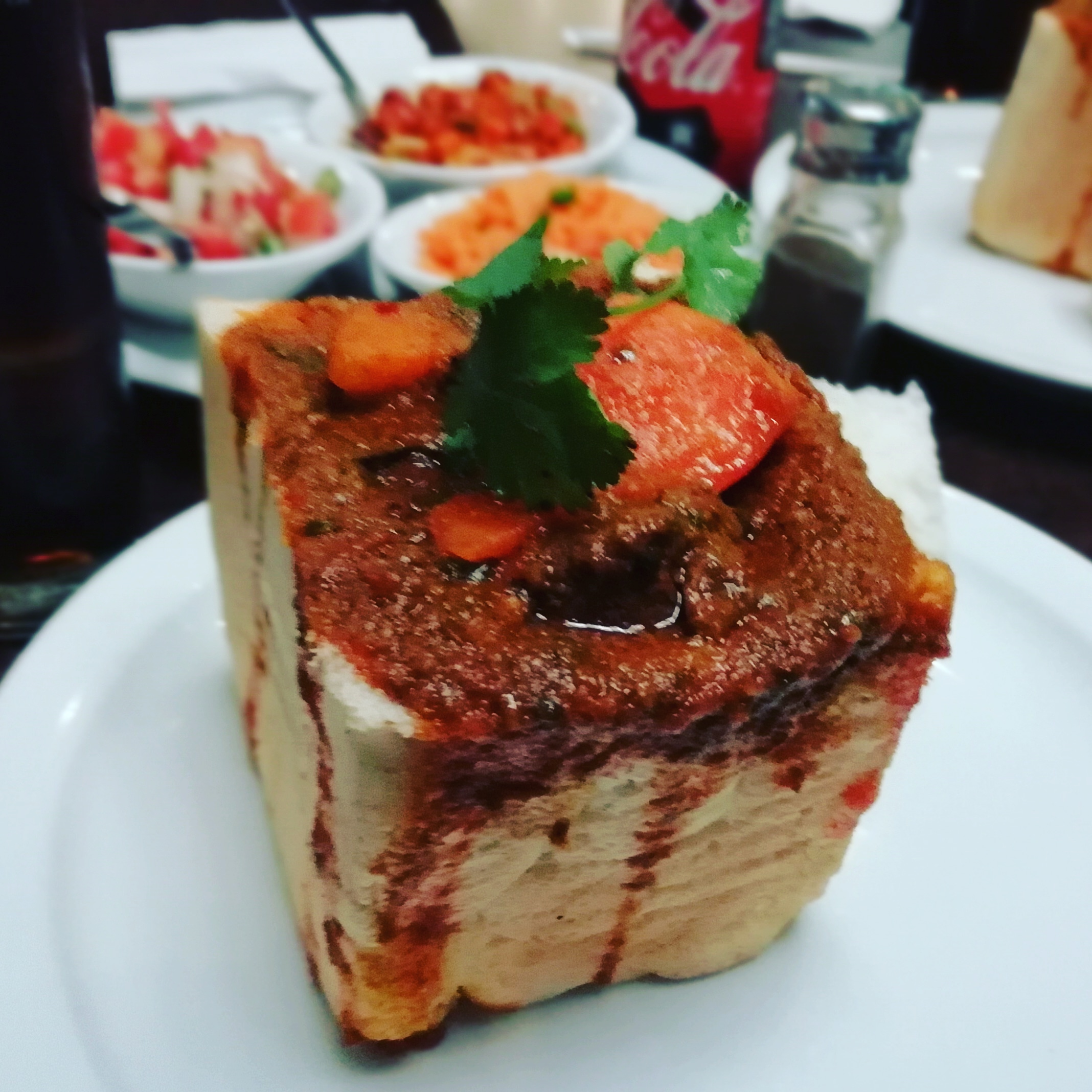
Bunny chow, South Africa

Curry spread to South Africa with the migration of people from the Indian subcontinent to the region in the colonial era. African curries, Cape Malay curries and Natal curries include the traditional Natal curry, the Durban curry, bunny chow, and roti rolls. South African curries appear to have been created in both KwaZulu-Natal and the Western Cape, while others developed across the country over the late 20th and early 21st centuries to include ekasi, coloured, and Afrikaner varieties. Durban has the highest population density of Indians outside of India in the world. Bunny chow or a "set", a South African standard, consists of either lamb, chicken or bean curry poured into a tunnelled-out loaf of bread to be eaten with one's fingers by dipping pieces of the bread into it. 'Bunny chow' is most likely an English compounding of two existing terms: 'bania', a merchant, from Hindi baniyā with the same meaning, ultimately from Sanskrit vaṇij; and 'chow', from 'chow-chow', "a mixture". The method of serving the curry was created because apartheid forbade black people from eating in Indian restaurants; the loaves could speedily be taken away and eaten in the street.

=== South Asia ===
Spicy Indian dishes were until the late 20th century not called "curry" by Indians: the term was initially limited to Anglo-Indian cuisine. Instead, numerous Indian dishes like dopiaza and rogan josh had their own names; the historian of food Colleen Sen notes that the Indian cook Madhur Jaffrey found the umbrella term 'curry' "degrading to India's great cuisine", but eventually accepted the category in her later writings. Both the names of the dishes and their methods of preparation are often regional.

Indian curry sauces are made with spices including black pepper, cardamom, chili peppers, cinnamon, cloves, coriander, cumin, fennel seed, mustard seed, and turmeric. As many as 15 spices may be used for a meat curry. The spices are sometimes fried whole, sometimes roasted, sometimes ground and mixed into a paste. The sauces are eaten with steamed rice or idli rice cakes in south India, and breads such as chapatis, roti, and naan in the north. The popular rogan josh, for example, from Kashmiri cuisine, is a wet dish of lamb with a red gravy coloured by Kashmiri chillies and an extract of the red flowers of the cockscomb plant (mawal).

Rice and curry is the staple dish of Sri Lanka.

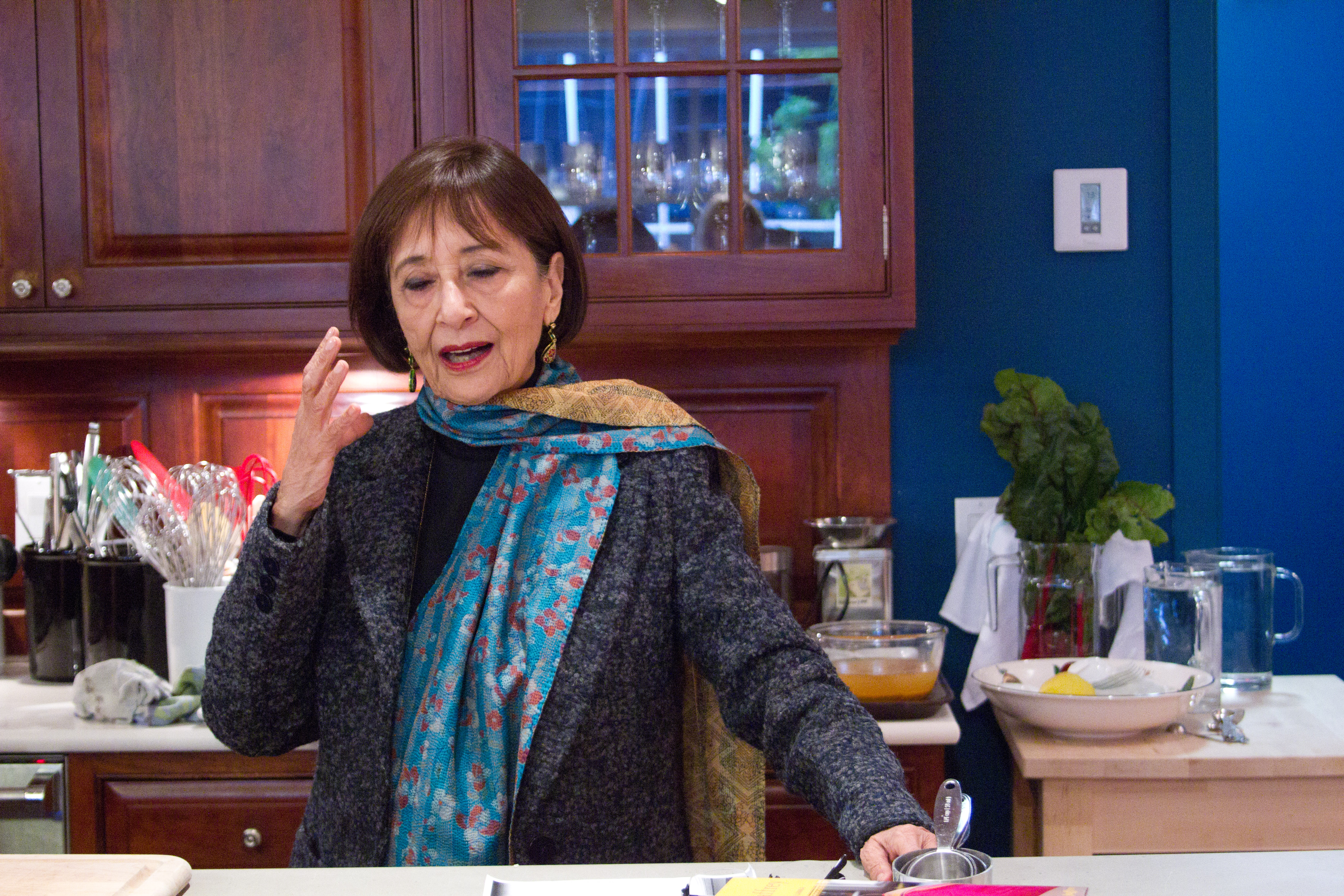
The Indian cook Madhur Jaffrey initially objected to the Anglo-Indian term "curry", but came around to using it.

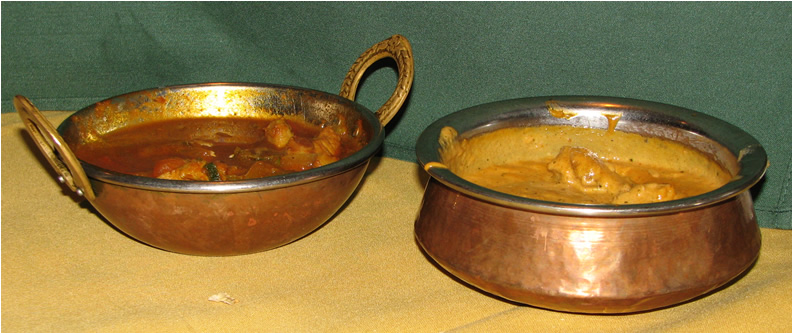
Traditional Indian karahi (left) and handi (right) serving dishes

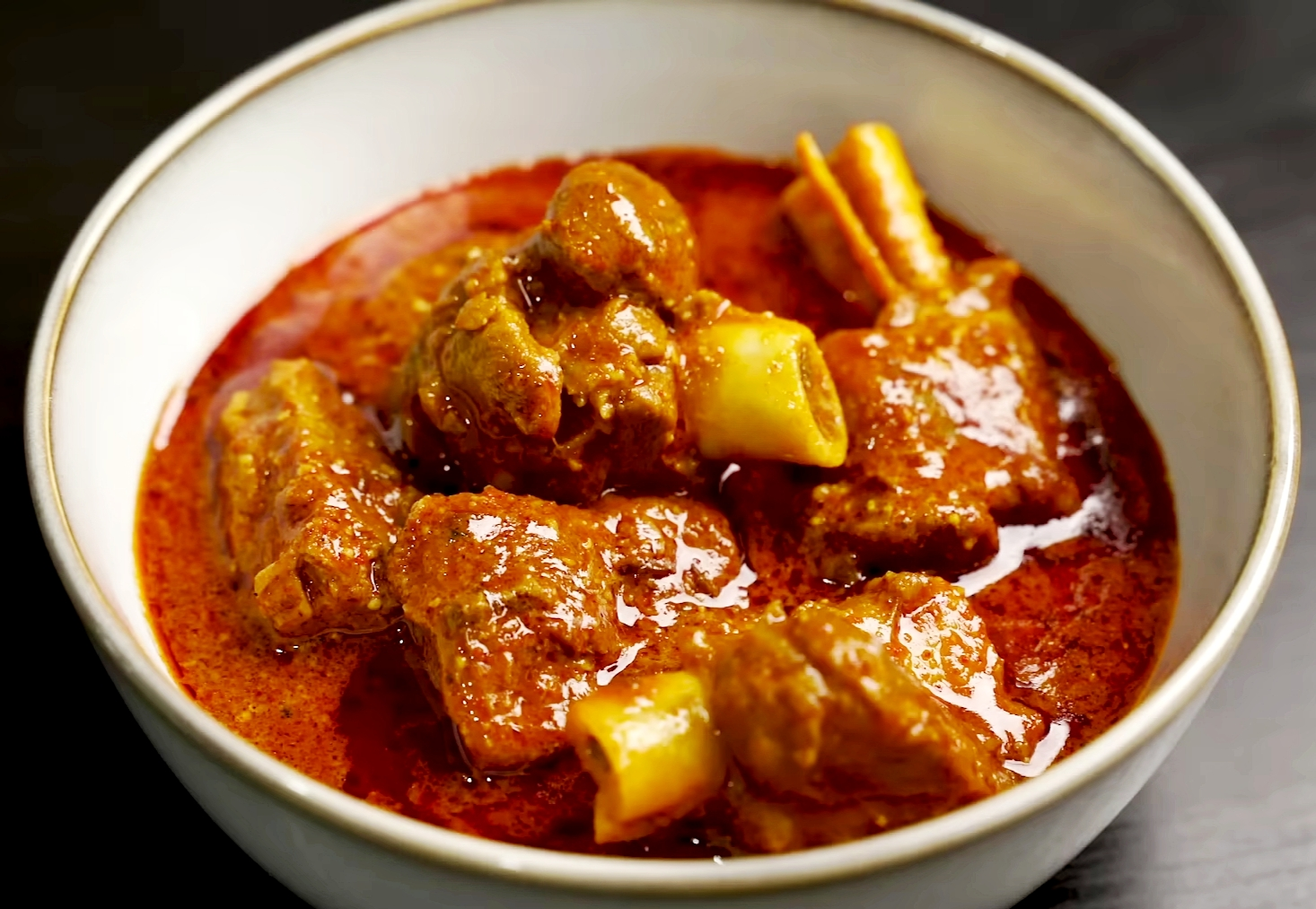
Rogan josh, a Kashmiri curry

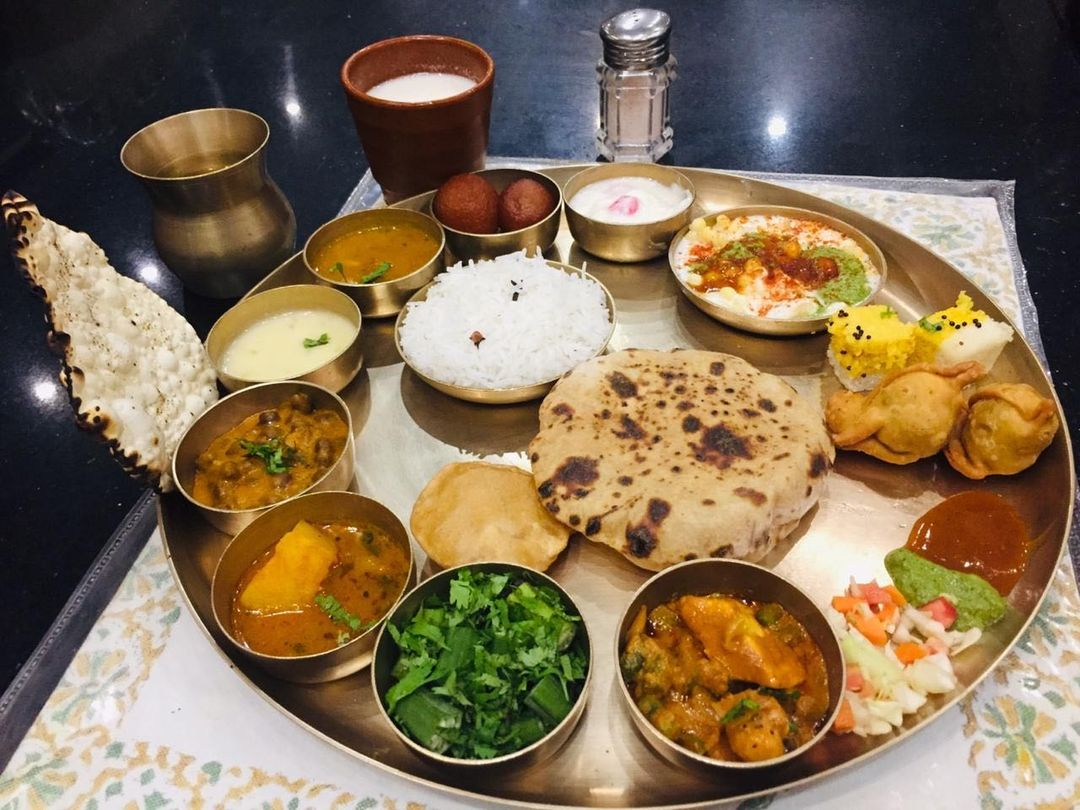
A North Indian thali curry meal

=== Southeast Asia ===
In Burmese cuisine, curries are broadly called hin. Burmese curries contains meat simmered in a curry paste containing onion, garlic, shrimp paste, tomato, and turmeric. Burmese curries are often mild, without chili, and somewhat oily.

Thai curries are called gaeng, and usually consist of meat, fish or vegetables in a sauce based on a paste made from chilies, onions or shallots, garlic, and shrimp paste. A few stir-fried Thai dishes use phong kari, an Indian style curry powder. Thai curries are often colour-coded green, yellow, and red, with green usually the mildest, red the hottest. Green curry is flavoured with green chili, coriander, kaffir lime, and basil; yellow, with yellow chili and turmeric; and red, with red chili.

Malaysian Indian cuisine adapted curries (such as gulai, with coconut milk) via the region's Indian population, but it has become a staple among the Malay and Chinese populations there. Malaysian curries have many varieties, but are often flavoured with cumin, cinnamon, turmeric, coconut milk, shallots, chili peppers, and garlic.

Indian Indonesian cuisine consists of adaptations of authentic dishes from India, as well as original creations inspired by the diverse food culture of Indonesia. Curry in Indonesian is kari and in Javanese, kare. In Indonesian cuisine especially in Bandung, there is a dish called lontong kari, a combined of lontong and beef yellow curry soup. In Javanese cuisine, kare rajungan, blue swimmer crab curry has become a delicacy of Tuban Regency, East Java.

In Vietnamese cuisine, influenced by both Thai and Indian cooking, curry is known as cà ri. Curry was brought to Vietnam by French colonisers, from their Indian outpost at Pondicherry in the late 19th and early 20th centuries. In the south of the country in particular, the Vietnamese adopted Madras curry powder and coconut milk as the basis of dishes such as chicken lemongrass curry, cà ri gà.

In the Philippines, a dish that may have been directly inspired by Indian curries is the oxtail stew kare-kare, possibly influenced by Sepoy expatriates during the brief British occupation of Manila (1762–1764), or indirectly via Southeast Asian spicy dishes. Ginataan are native dishes using coconut milk, which as in the case of Filipino chicken curry can be called 'curries' when curry powder is added.

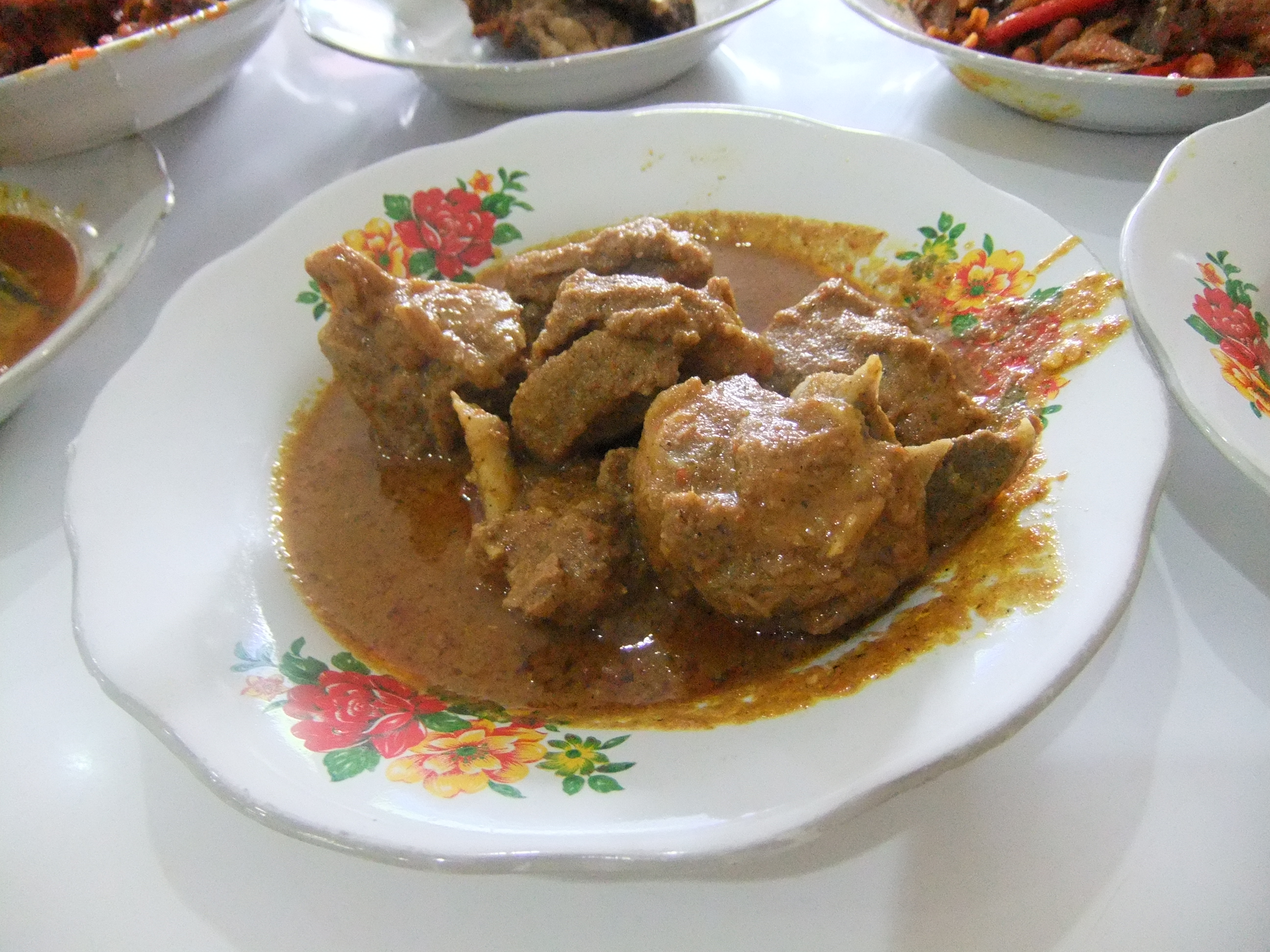
Indonesian mutton gulai (curry), part of nasi padang

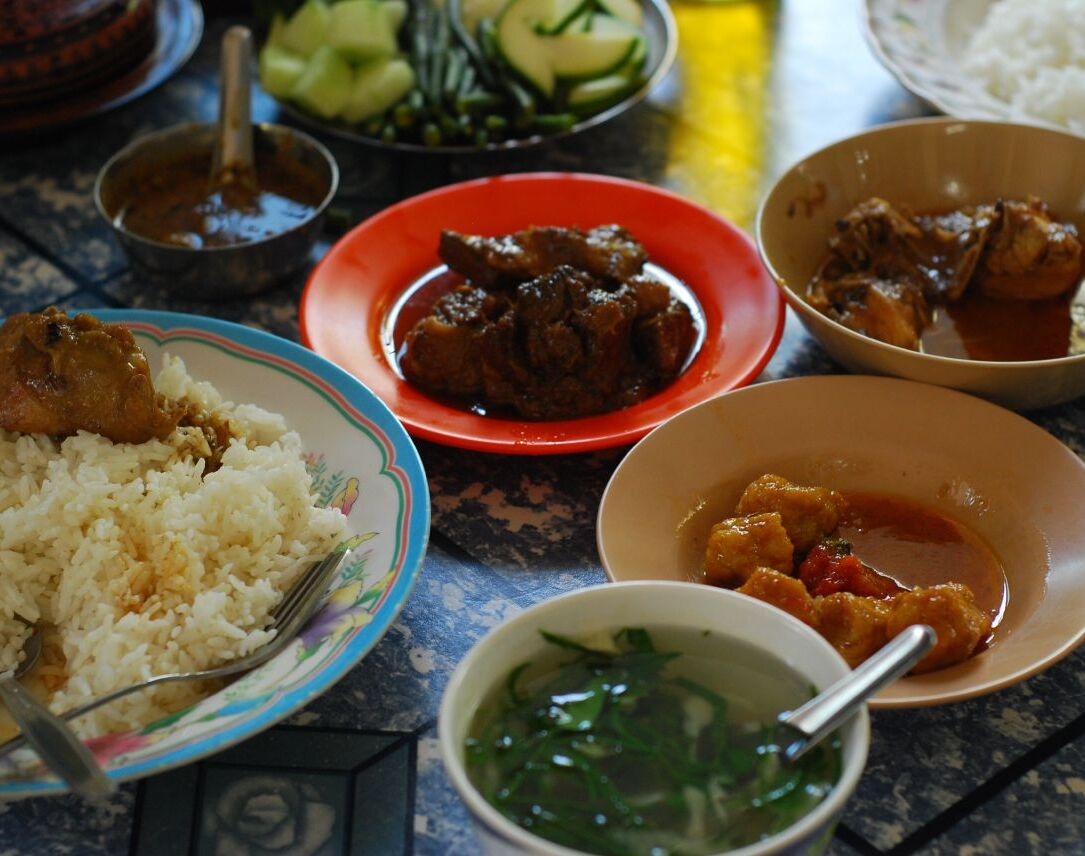
Burmese curries

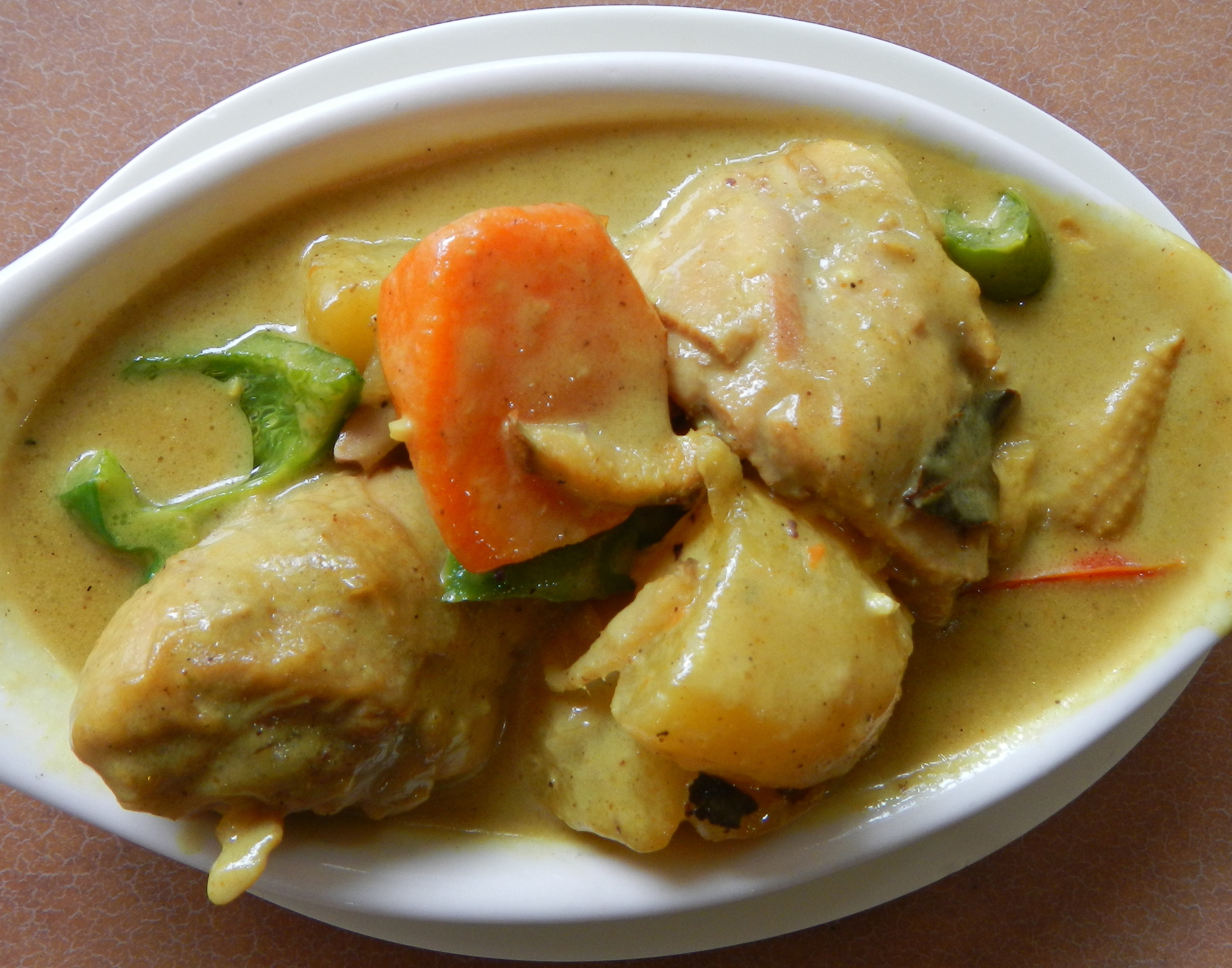
Filipino chicken curry

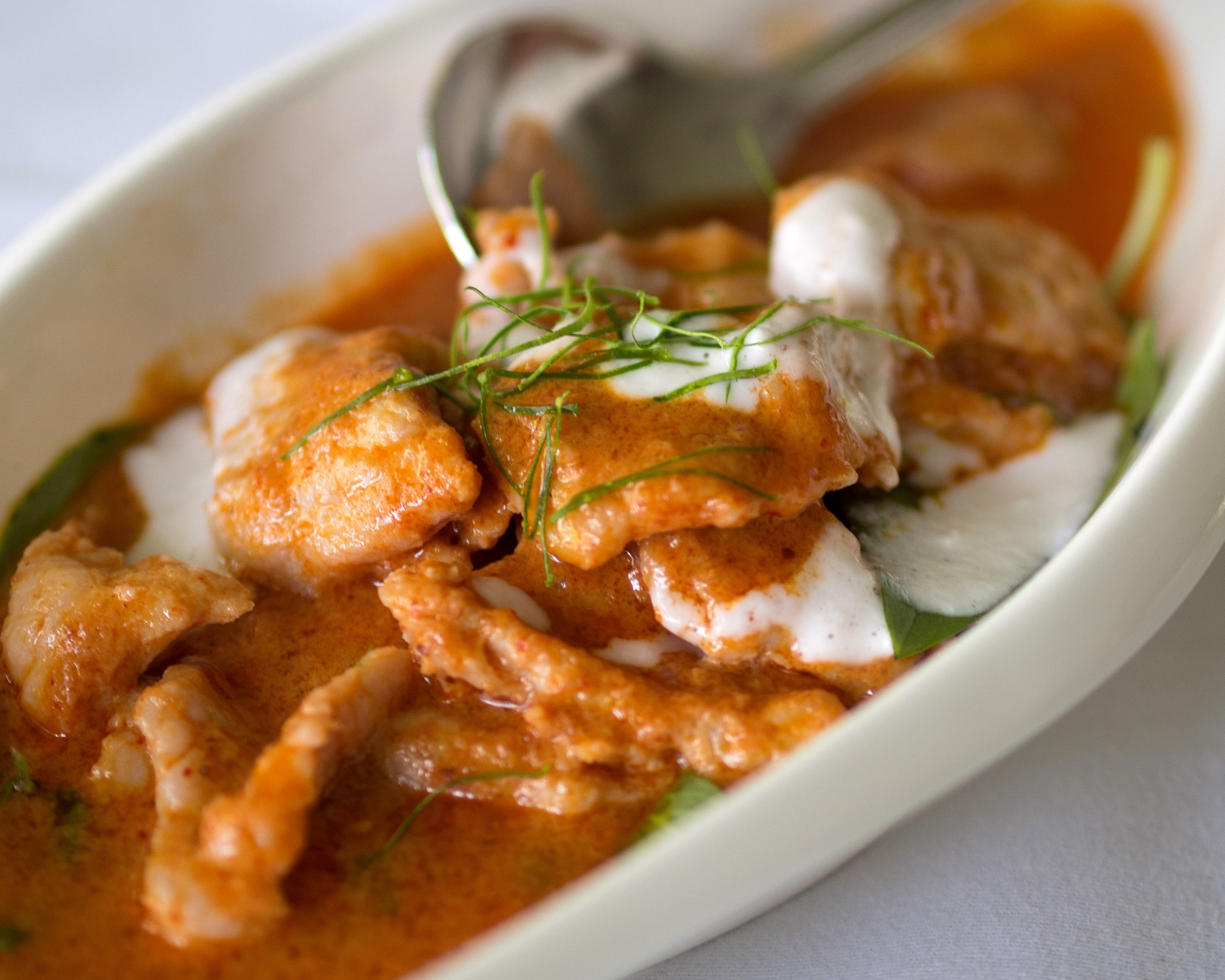
Thai phanaeng with pork

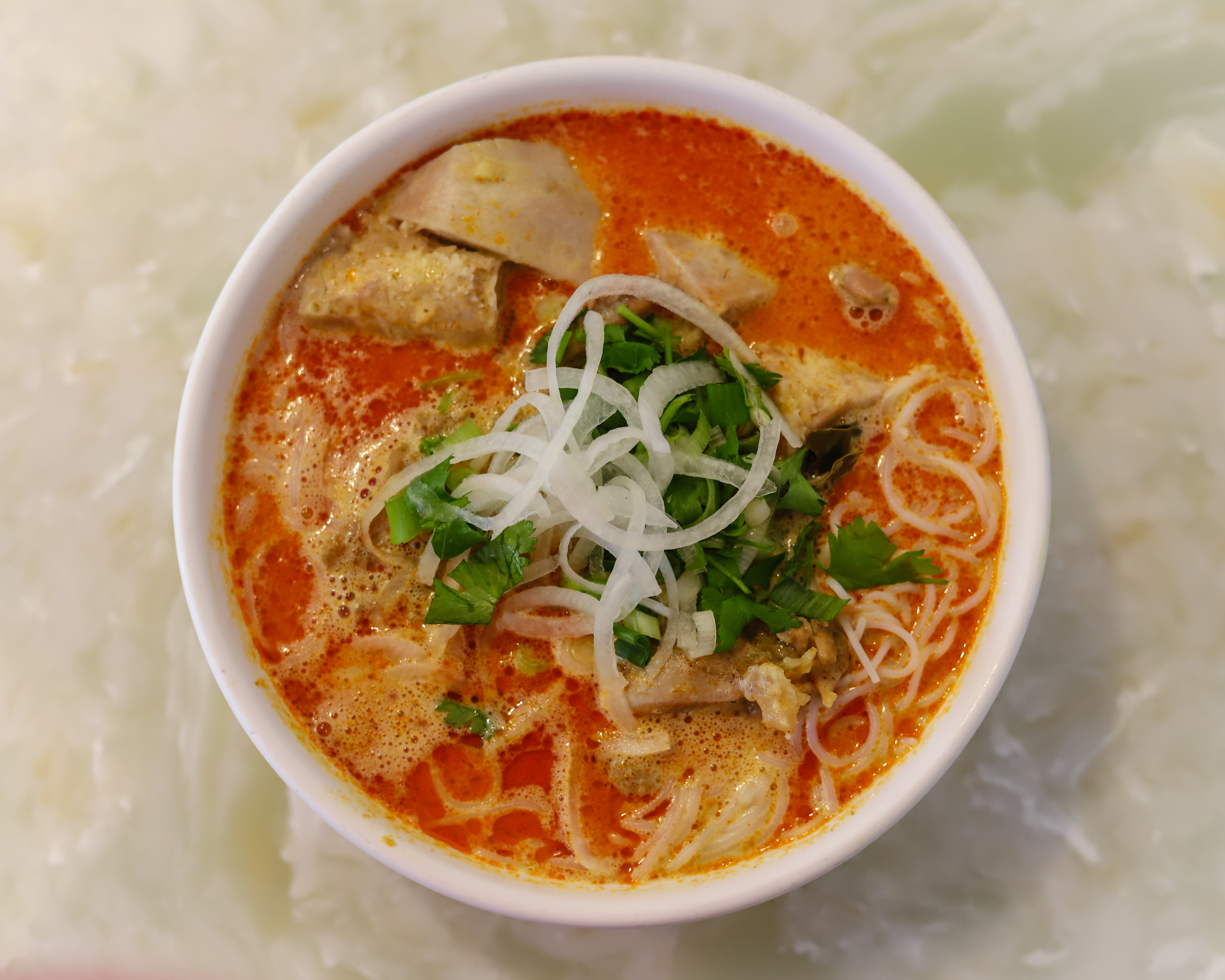
Vietnamese cà ri with chicken

=== United Kingdom ===
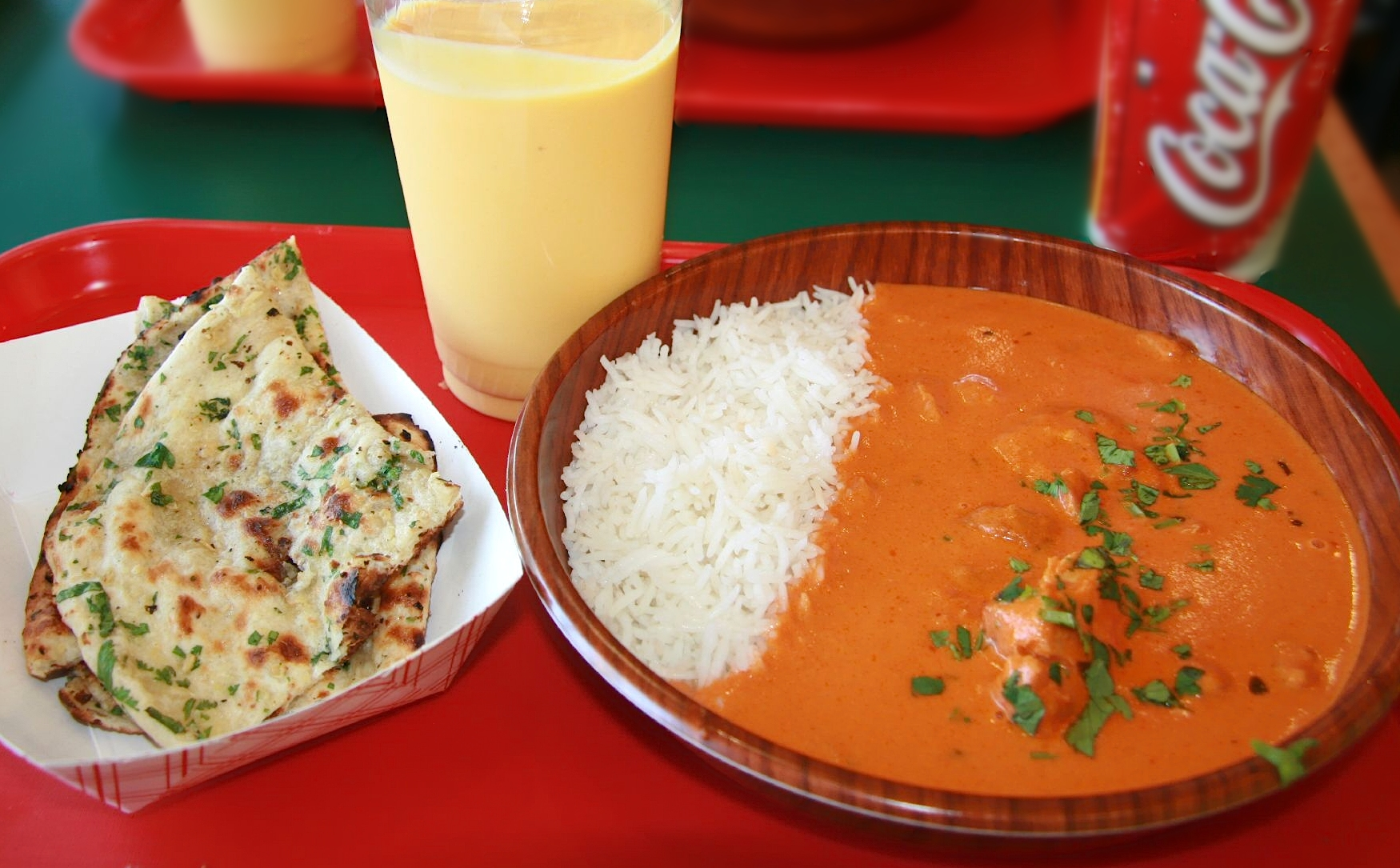
Chicken tikka masala has been called "a true British national dish".

Curry is very popular in the United Kingdom, with a curry house in nearly every town. It was estimated that in 2016 there were 12,000 curry houses, employing 100,000 people and with annual combined sales of approximately £4.2 billion. The food offered is cooked to British taste, but with increasing demand for authentic Indian styles. In 2001, chicken tikka masala was described by the British foreign secretary Robin Cook as "a true British national dish, not only because it is the most popular, but because it is a perfect illustration of the way Britain absorbs and adapts external influences."

Curries in Britain are derived partly from India and partly from invention in local Indian restaurants. They vary from mildly-spiced to extremely hot, with names that are to an extent standardised across the country, but are often unknown in India. Zoe Perrett, writing for The Times of India, comments that anyone expecting traditional Indian cuisine from "Brindian" cuisine, a "Bangla spin on Indian regional dishes, twisted still further to tempt British tastebuds", will be disappointed. Variants like "Kashmir" and "Malaya" curry add fruits like banana, lychees, and pineapple. In short, the food might be, Perrett writes, "not Indian at all." Inexpensive curry kits, containing a packet of whole spices, a packet of spice paste, and a pouch of sauce, are sold in British supermarkets, enabling a curry of "exceptional" quality to be cooked quickly at home.

Range of strengths of British curries
Strength	Example	Place of origin	Date of origin	Description
Mild	Korma	Mughal court, North India	16th century	Mild, creamy; may have almond, coconut, or fruit
Medium	Madras	Anglo-Indian cuisine in British Raj, then British Bangladeshi restaurants	1970s	Red, spicy with chili powder
Hot	Vindaloo	Portuguese Carne de vinha d'alhos (pork with wine vinegar and garlic)	1970s	Very spicy with chili peppers, vinegar, and potatoes (Note: The addition of potatoes may be from confusion of 'Vindaloo' with Hindi आलू āloo, potato.)
Extreme	Phall	British Bangladeshi, Birmingham	20th century	High-strength chili pepper e.g. scotch bonnet, habanero

== Sources ==
- Collingham, Lizzie (2006) [2005 (Chatto & Windus)]. Curry: A Tale of Cooks and Conquerors. London: Vintage Books. ISBN 978-0-099-43786-4.
- Davidson, Alan (2014). Tom Jaine (ed.). The Oxford Companion to Food (3rd ed.). Oxford: Oxford University Press. ISBN 978-0-19-967733-7.
- Iyer, Raghavan (2008). 660 Curries. New York: Workman Publishing. pp. 2–3. ISBN 978-0761137870.
- Iyer, Raghavan (2022). On the Curry Trail: Chasing the Flavor That Seduced the World. New York: Workman Publishing. ISBN 978-1523511211. OCLC 1374192575.
- Sen, Colleen Taylor (2009). Curry: A Global History. Edible. London: Reaktion Books. ISBN 978-1861895226. OCLC 1391407698.
