= Madras curry =

Type of curry

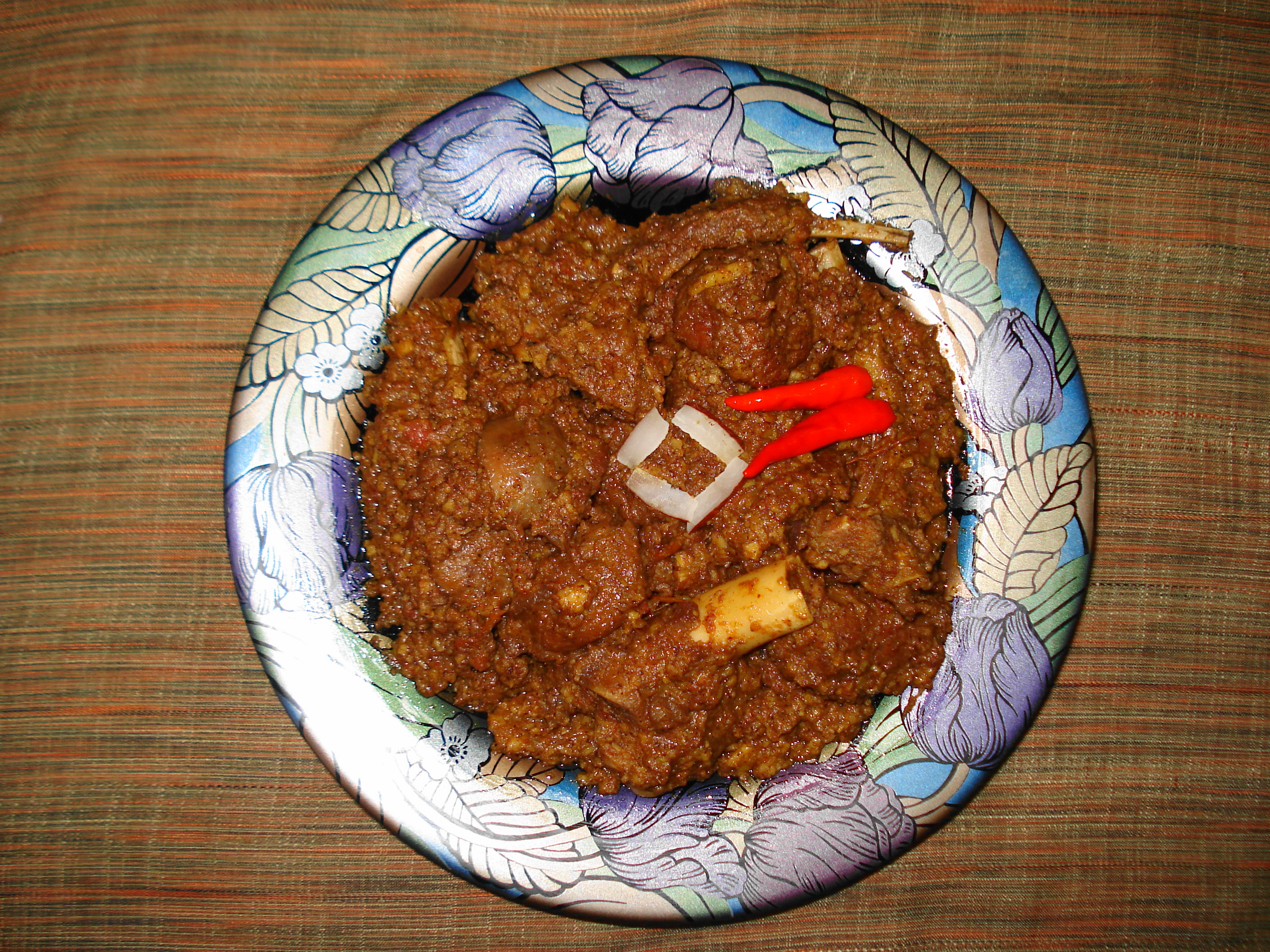
- Type: Curry
- Place of origin: India
- Created by: Anglo-Indian cuisine
- Serving temperature: Hot
- Main ingredients: Curry powder

Madras curry is a curry made with a sauce of onions and tomatoes, made spicy hot with chili pepper and a curry powder made from a mixture of other spices. The dish was invented in Anglo-Indian cuisine; the name is unknown in Indian cuisine.

== Origins ==
Madras curry gets its name from the city of Madras (now Chennai) at the time of the British Raj; the name is not used in Indian cuisine. The name and the dish were invented in Anglo-Indian cuisine for a simplified spicy sauce made using curry powder, tomatoes, and onions. The name denotes a generalised hot curry. The standardised and effective Madras curry powder enabled curry to spread to many other countries.

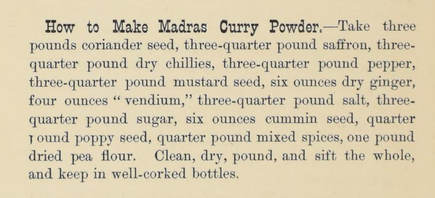
"How to make Madras Curry Powder" by Henrietta Hervey, 1895

In her 1895 book Anglo-Indian Cooking at Home, Henrietta Hervey described how to make three curry powders, which she called "Madras", "Bombay", and "Bengal". Her "Madras" powder recipe called for coriander, saffron, chilli, mustard seed, pepper, and cumin, among other ingredients.

== Variations ==
There are many variations on Madras curry. For example, the television chef James Martin makes his curry powder using black pepper, cinnamon, cloves, coriander, cumin, fennel seed, fenugreek, mustard seed, and turmeric, while his sauce contains fresh bay leaves, chilli pods, garlic, ginger, onion, tamarind, and tomato.

== Sources ==
- Collingham, Lizzie (2006) [2005 (Chatto & Windus)]. Curry: A Tale of Cooks and Conquerors. London: Vintage Books. ISBN 978-0-099-43786-4.
- Hervey, Henrietta (2006) [1895]. Anglo-Indian Cookery at Home. London: Horace Cox. ISBN 978-1-900318-33-4.
- Iyer, Raghavan (2022). On the Curry Trail: Chasing the Flavor That Seduced the World. New York: Workman Publishing. ISBN 978-1523511211. OCLC 1374192575.
