= Lokopakara =

11th-century Kannada book

Lokopakara (Kannada: ಲೋಕೋಪಕಾರ) is a Kannada work attributed to Chavundaraya and dated to 1025. Written in Old Kannada (Halagannada), it consists of twelve chapters covering subjects including astrology, omens, architecture, water divining, plant life, medicine, veterinary medicine, perfumery and cookery.

== Date and authorship ==
The work is dated to 1025 and is attributed to Chavundaraya. It was written in Old Kannada (Halagannada) and draws on earlier Sanskrit works dealing with subjects covered in the text.

== Text and structure ==
The work consists of twelve chapters. Its subjects include astrology, omens, architecture, water divining, plant life, medicine, veterinary medicine, perfumery and cookery.

== Water resources ==
The work contains material on methods for locating underground water. The discussion includes observations concerning vegetation, anthills, rocks and other features used as indicators of underground water.

== Supa Sastra ==
The eighth chapter, Supa Sastra, deals with cookery. It describes ingredients and methods of preparing food.

== Editions and translations ==
A critical edition of the text was prepared by H. Sesha Iyengar and published by the Government Oriental Manuscripts Library, Madras, in 1950.

An English translation by Valmiki Sreenivasa Ayangarya was published by the Asian Agri-History Foundation in 2006. The translation is based on the original text published in twelve chapters by the Madras Government Oriental Manuscripts Library in 1950.
