= Lizzie Collingham =

English food historian

Lizzie Collingham is an independent scholar known for her books on English food culture, including the 2006 book Curry: A Tale of Cooks and Conquerors. Collingham won the Guild of Food Writers Food Book Award in 2018 for The Hungry Empire.

== Early life ==
Lizzie Collingham was born in England in 1969. She gained her BA at the University of Sussex in 1991, and an MA at the University of York in 1992. She earned her PhD on the "British body in India (1800–1947)" at the University of Cambridge in 1997.

== Career ==
Collingham began her career teaching history at the University of Warwick. From there she became a junior research fellow at Jesus College, Cambridge. She then chose to work independently, remaining as a bye-fellow of Jesus College. She has been a writing fellow for the Royal Literary Fund at the University of East Anglia and has worked in other colleges at the University of Cambridge, including Newnham College. She has served as a specialist lecturer on food for Martin Randall Travel.

== Reception ==
=== Curry ===
Reviewing Curry: A Tale of Cooks and Conquerors for Eclectica, Niranjana Iyer wrote that as an Indian living in the West, he read the book with delight. He notes that the spice most characteristic of Indian cuisine and the British Vindaloo curry was brought by Christopher Columbus from the New World to Spain, and then by Vasco da Gama from Portugal to India. "Vindaloo" itself is, he writes, garbled Portuguese vinho e alhos, "wine and garlic". He notes, too, that chai was invented by the British and then adopted by Indians. His only regret is that there are few vegetarian curries in the book.

William Grimes, reviewing Curry for The New York Times, described it as a "fascinating if digressive inquiry", into one of the world's "most internationalized foods". He notes Japan's curry rice karee raisu and Samoa's canned fish and corned beef curry, alongside New York's kosher curries, or the British curried chicken Kiev. Grimes comments that the subject in Collingham's hands is far wider than curry, as it explores Indian cuisine's "often bizarre" cultural exchanges and its global export, stating that "it is a British invention".

Writing in The Guardian, Nicola Barr commented that Collingham counters the view that dishes like (chicken) tikka masala are somehow "less authentic" than some supposedly "pure" dish in India. Barr notes Collingham's analysis, that Indian food "has always been the product of cultural integration, its flavours influenced by colonisation and emigration from the days of the British Raj."

=== The Hungry Empire ===
Kwasi Kwarteng, in The Guardian, calls The Hungry Empire "an energetic and refreshing account of a little considered aspect of British history." He comments that Collingham uses people's diet to analyse their "complex, even chaotic international connections." The book, based on 20 meals, examines each meal's story about the British Empire. Christmas pudding, Kwarteng writes, was considered a national dish and personified as a "blackamoor who derives his extraction from the spice lands", because its dried fruits, spices, and sugar all came from the colonies. He comments that Collingham's is a "remarkable achievement" to make an old subject so exciting.

=== The Taste of War ===
The Guardian's review of The Taste of War, by Lara Feigel, states that war and famine go together, sometimes as a deliberate strategy. Both Germany and Britain prevented populations from getting their food during the Second World War. Feigel complains that Collingham was writing "two books at once": one of history, one of a "prehistory of the present", showing how the past governs the present; in her view, the book should have had "a single, chronological narrative". But overall, she found the book "timely and sensible" as the need to share food equitably is again becoming an issue.

== Books ==
- Collingham, Lizzie (2001). Imperial Bodies: The Physical Experience of the Raj, c. 1800–1947. Malden, Massachusetts: Blackwell Publishers. ISBN 978-0745623702. OCLC 505223341.
- ––––– (2005). Curry: A Biography of a Dish. London: Chatto & Windus. ISBN 978-0701173357. OCLC 224538350.
- ––––– (2006). Curry: A Tale of Cooks and Conquerors. Oxford: Oxford University Press. ISBN 978-0199883813.
- ––––– (2013). The Taste of War: World War II and the Battle for Food. London: Penguin Books. ISBN 978-0143123019.
- ––––– (2017). The Hungry Empire: How Britain's Quest for Food Shaped the Modern World. London: The Bodley Head. ISBN 978-1-59420-329-9.
- ––––– (2021). The Biscuit: The History of a Very British Indulgence. London: Vintage Books. ISBN 978-1529112245.

== Honours and distinctions ==
Collingham won the Guild of Food Writers Food Book Award 2018 for her book The Hungry Empire.
