= Raghavan Iyer (chef) =

Indian-born American chef and cookbook author (1961–2023)

- Born: Raghavan Ramachandran Iyer; April 21, 1961; Chidambaram, Tamil Nadu, India
- Died: March 31, 2023 (aged 61); San Francisco, California, U.S.
- Education: Michigan State University
- Occupations: Chef; food writer
- Partner: Terry Erickson
- Children: 1
- Writing career
- Period: 2001–2023
- Subject: Indian cuisine

Raghavan Ramachandran Iyer (21 April 1961 – 31 March 2023) was an Indian-American chef and author. His series of cookbooks and guides to Indian cooking, beginning with Betty Crocker's Indian Home Cooking in 2001, introduced many Americans to the cuisine. He earned praise for accessibility and controversy for straying from tradition for his embrace of simplified ingredients such as curry powder.

== Life and career ==
Raghavan Ramachandran Iyer was born on 21 April 1961 in Chidambaram, in the Cuddalore district of Tamil Nadu, India. He grew up in Mumbai. He moved to the United States in 1982 to study hospitality management at Southwest Minnesota State University, before transferring to Michigan State University. After using his background as a French teacher to find work in the field, he eventually became a chef and cookbook writer. His first book, published in 2001, was Betty Crocker's Indian Home Cooking, an introduction to Indian food aimed at Americans with limited previous experience with it. The Betty Crocker book was the first of a number of popular cookbooks on the subject; as the New York Times reported, he "has by some estimations taught more Americans how to cook Indian food than anyone else." In 2016, he won a James Beard Foundation Award for his video series Indian Curries: The Basics and Beyond. His final major project was a crowdfunded enterprise called The Revival Foods Project: Global Comforts That Heal.

== Personal life and death ==
Iyer met his future partner, Terry Erickson, on his first day in Minnesota; he and Erickson lived in Minneapolis and raised a son together.

In his late 50s, Iyer was diagnosed with colorectal cancer, and decided to go public with the news to encourage others to get screened. After five years of living with the disease, he disclosed that it had metastasized to his brain and lungs and he did not expect to survive. At the end of March 2023, Iyer was visiting friends in San Francisco when he fell ill with pneumonia, as a complication of the cancer. He was admitted to UCSF Medical Center on March 27 and died four days later, on March 31, at the age of 61.

== Works ==
- Iyer, Raghavan (February 28, 2023). On the Curry Trail: Chasing the Flavor That Seduced the World. Workman Publishing Company. ISBN 978-1-5235-2073-2.
- Iyer, Raghavan (November 1, 2016). Smashed, Mashed, Boiled, and Baked--and Fried, Too!: A Celebration of Potatoes in 75 Irresistible Recipes. Workman Publishing Company. ISBN 978-0-7611-8973-2.
- Iyer, Raghavan (July 30, 2013). Indian Cooking Unfolded: A Master Class in Indian Cooking, Featuring 100 Easy Recipes Using 10 Ingredients or Less. Workman Publishing Company. ISBN 978-0-7611-7700-5.
- Iyer, Raghavan (May 1, 2008). 660 Curries. Workman Publishing Company. ISBN 978-0-7611-3787-0.
- Iyer, Raghavan (June 29, 2002). The Turmeric Trail: Recipes and Memories from an Indian Childhood. Macmillan. ISBN 978-0-312-27682-9.
