= List of United Kingdom locations: Bam-Bap =

The United Kingdom

This is part of the list of United Kingdom locations: a gazetteer of place names in the United Kingdom showing each place's locality and geographical coordinates.

== Ba (continued) ==
=== Bam-Bap ===
Location	Locality	Coordinates (links to map & photo sources)	OS grid reference
Bamber Bridge	Lancashire	53.72°N 02.66°W	SD5626
Bamber's Green	Essex	51.88°N 00.27°E	TL5723
Bamburgh	Northumberland	55.59°N 01.73°W	NU1734
Bamford	Rochdale	53.61°N 02.21°W	SD8613
Bamford	Derbyshire	53.34°N 01.70°W	SK2083
Bamfurlong	Gloucestershire	51.88°N 02.14°W	SO9021
Bamfurlong	Wigan	53.50°N 02.61°W	SD5901
Bampton	Devon	50.98°N 03.49°W	SS9522
Bampton	Oxfordshire	51.72°N 01.55°W	SP3103
Bampton	Cumbria	54.55°N 02.75°W	NY5118
Bampton Grange	Cumbria	54.55°N 02.74°W	NY5218
Banavie	Highland	56.84°N 05.10°W	NN1177
Banbury	Oxfordshire	52.05°N 01.34°W	SP4540
Bancffosfelen	Carmarthenshire	51.77°N 04.20°W	SN4811
Banchory	Aberdeenshire	57.04°N 02.51°W	NO6995
Banchory-Devenick	Aberdeenshire	57.10°N 02.15°W	NJ9102
Bancycapel	Carmarthenshire	51.81°N 04.29°W	SN4215
Banc-y-Darren	Ceredigion	52.42°N 03.95°W	SN6782
Bancyfelin	Carmarthenshire	51.83°N 04.44°W	SN3218
Bancyfford	Carmarthenshire	52.00°N 04.33°W	SN4037
Bandonhill	Sutton	51.36°N 00.14°W	TQ2964
Bandrake Head	Cumbria	54.27°N 03.06°W	SD3187
Banff	Aberdeenshire	57.66°N 02.53°W	NJ6864
Bangor	Gwynedd	53.21°N 04.14°W	SH5771
Bangor-on-Dee / Bangor-is-y-coed	Wrexham	52.99°N 02.91°W	SJ3945
Bangor	County Down	54.66°N 5.67°W	NW6436
Bangors	Cornwall	50.76°N 04.55°W	SX2099
Bangor Teifi	Ceredigion	52.03°N 04.36°W	SN3840
Banham	Norfolk	52.45°N 01.03°E	TM0688
Bank	Hampshire	50.86°N 01.60°W	SU2807
Bank End (Broughton West)	Cumbria	54.28°N 03.24°W	SD1988
Bank End (Maryport)	Cumbria	54.72°N 03.49°W	NY0438
Bankend	Dumfries and Galloway	54.99°N 03.53°W	NY0268
Bank Fold	Lancashire	53.71°N 02.44°W	SD7124
Bankfoot	Perth and Kinross	56.49°N 03.52°W	NO0635
Bankglen	East Ayrshire	55.38°N 04.22°W	NS5912
Bankhead	South Lanarkshire	55.65°N 03.78°W	NS8842
Bankhead	City of Aberdeen	57.17°N 02.20°W	NJ8809
Bankhead	City of Glasgow	55.81°N 04.23°W	NS6060
Bankhead	Angus	56.54°N 02.87°W	NO4639
Bankhead	Falkirk	55.99°N 03.92°W	NS8080
Bank Hey	Lancashire	53.76°N 02.47°W	SD6930
Bank Houses	Lancashire	53.97°N 02.87°W	SD4353
Bankland	Somerset	51.05°N 02.98°W	ST3129
Bank Lane	Bury	53.64°N 02.31°W	SD7917
Bank Newton	North Yorkshire	53.97°N 02.13°W	SD9153
Banknock	Falkirk	55.98°N 03.95°W	NS7879
Banks	Dumfries and Galloway	54.81°N 04.04°W	NX6948
Banks	Cumbria	54.96°N 02.68°W	NY5664
Banks	Lancashire	53.67°N 02.92°W	SD3920
Bank's Green	Worcestershire	52.30°N 02.01°W	SO9967
Bankshead	Shropshire	52.49°N 03.03°W	SO3089
Bankshill	Dumfries and Galloway	55.11°N 03.27°W	NY1981
Bankside	Falkirk	56.00°N 03.78°W	NS8981
Bank Street	Worcestershire	52.25°N 02.54°W	SO6362
Bank Top	Northumberland	54.98°N 01.78°W	NZ1466
Bank Top	Calderdale	53.71°N 01.84°W	SE1024
Bank Top	Bradford	53.82°N 01.72°W	SE1836
Bank Top	Lancashire	53.55°N 02.74°W	SD5107
Bank Top	Bolton	53.60°N 02.42°W	SD7212
Bank Top	City of Stoke-on-Trent	53.05°N 02.19°W	SJ8751
Banners Gate	Birmingham	52.55°N 01.88°W	SP0895
Banningham	Norfolk	52.81°N 01.27°E	TG2129
Bannister Green	Essex	51.85°N 00.45°E	TL6920
Bannockburn	Stirling	56.08°N 03.93°W	NS8090
Banns	Cornwall	50.28°N 05.23°W	SW7048
Banstead	Surrey	51.31°N 00.20°W	TQ2559
Bantam Grove	Leeds	53.73°N 01.59°W	SE2727
Bantaskin	Falkirk	55.99°N 03.81°W	NS8779
Bantham	Devon	50.27°N 03.88°W	SX6643
Banton	North Lanarkshire	55.98°N 04.00°W	NS7579
Banwell	North Somerset	51.32°N 02.87°W	ST3959
Bapchild	Kent	51.32°N 00.75°E	TQ9262
Baptist End	Dudley	52.49°N 02.08°W	SO9488
Bapton	Wiltshire	51.14°N 02.01°W	ST9938
