= Parsi cuisine =

Traditional cuisine of the Parsis of India and Pakistan

Parsi cuisine refers to the traditional cuisine of the Parsi people who had migrated into the Indian subcontinent from Persia, and currently spread across the modern-day South Asian republics of India and Pakistan.

== Primary meals ==
The basic feature of a Parsi lunch is rice, eaten with lentils or a curry. Curry is made with coconut and ras without, with curry usually being thicker than ras. Dinner would be a meat dish, often accompanied by potatoes or other vegetable curry. Kachumbar (a sharp onion-cucumber salad) accompanies most meals.

Popular Parsi dishes include:

- Chicken Farcha (Fried chicken appetizer)
- Dhansak (Lamb, mutton, goat, chicken or vegetables in a mixed lentil or toor daal gravy served with brown rice)
- Patra ni Machhi (Fish - Pomfret or Surmai stuffed heavily with green coconut chutney and wrapped in a banana leaf - steam cooked.)
- Sali Murghi (Spicy chicken with fine fried matchstick potatoes)
- Saas ni Machhi (Yellow rice with pomfret fish fillets in white sauce)
- Kolmi no Patio (Shrimp in spicy tomato curry)
- Jardaloo Sali Boti (Boneless mutton in an onion and tomato sauce with apricots and fried matchstick potatoes)
- Khichri (rice with toor daal or moong daal)
- Tamota ni Ras Chaval (mutton cutlets with white rice and tomato sauce)

Also popular among Parsis, but less so elsewhere, are the typical Parsi eeda (egg) dishes, which include akuri (scrambled eggs with spices) and the pora ("Parsi" omelette). Also, vegetables like okra, tomato, potato and others are often cooked with eggs on top.

Traditional breakfasts during the 1930s in Mumbai or in many South Gujarat villages consisted of khurchan (offal meats cooked with potatoes in a spicy gravy), and some variant of the ubiquitous deep-fried, fried or half-fried eggs. In agrarian communities, this would be washed down by copious quantities of coconut toddy, often straight off the tree.

Although in the not-so-distant past, vegetables were considered a 'poor people's food', there is presently a trend towards light eating, no red meat and even vegetarianism.

== Desserts ==
Common desserts include sev (vermicelli), ravo (sweet semolina pudding) and malido (a nutty fudge). Also popular are faluda and kulfi, both of which are adoptions from the cuisines of the Irani and Persian-speaking communities. Wedding feasts traditionally include Lagan nu Custard.

== Snacks ==
Popular parsi snacks include bhakhra (deep fried sweet dough), batasa (tea biscuits), dar ni pori (sweetened lentils stuffed in a light pastry), doodh na puff (milk froth) and khaman na ladva (dumplings stuffed with sweetened coconut).

== See also ==
- Irani Cafe
