= Bank Street =

Bank Street may refer to:

- Bank Street (Ottawa)
- Bank Street (football ground), Manchester, England
- Bank Street (Manhattan)
- Bank Street, Hyderabad
- Bank Street (Hong Kong)
- Bank Street, Worcestershire, a village
- Bank Street in Kilmarnock, Scotland
- Bank Street in the Downtown New London Historic District, Connecticut
- Bank Street in the Downtown Fall River Historic District, Massachusetts
- Bank Street in Cincinnati, location of the Bank Street Grounds
- Bank Street College of Education or its Bank Street School for Children
- Bank Street is a northern continuation of George Street, Dunedin, New Zealand
- tram stop on the Inner West Light Rail, Sydney Australia
