= Cafe Niloufer =

Indian tea cafe chain

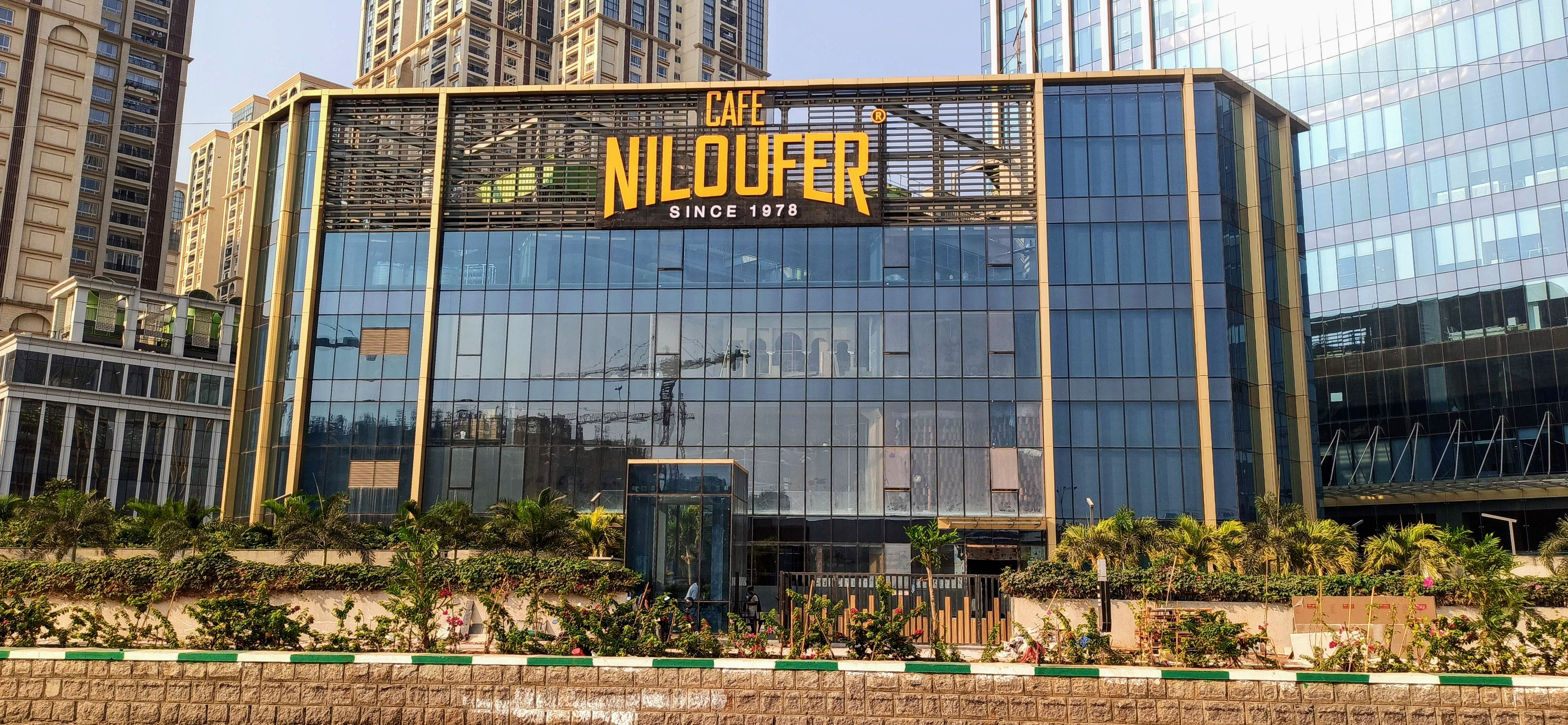
Cafe Niloufer at HITEC City

Cafe Niloufer is a tea cafe chain based in Hyderabad, India. The cafe is known for its Irani Chai & Bun Maska. The Chain is operated under the name ABR Cafe & Bakers Private Limited; it has grown from a single outlet to India's largest Chai Cafe, based in Hyderabad.

== History ==
A. Babu Rao established Niloufer Cafe in 1978 next to the renowned Niloufer Hospital, which also served as the inspiration for the name.

Babu Rao's rise has been central to the development of Niloufer Cafe. He came from a small village in Adilabad district in the mid-1970s with little money, and he started working at the Niloufer Cafe as a cleaner and waiter before learning to work in the kitchen. Later, Babu Rao started managing the entire cafe in 1978, and in 1993 he eventually purchased the entire rights with his savings. Under his ownership, Niloufer expanded from a single branch in Lakdikapul to multiple outlets in the neighbourhoods of Hyderabad city, including locations like HITECH City and Hyderabad Airport.

== Products ==
Bun Maska and Tea from Cafe Niloufer

The restaurant is most renowned for its Irani chai, which is made to a uniform house blend, and for its side dishes, which include malai buns, bun maska (buttered buns), and Osmania biscuits. The menu has grown over time to include vegetarian options, rice combos, millet-based dishes, and baked goods. The business has now entered the retail market, offering its tea blend for at-home preparation.

== See also ==
- Irani Cafe
- Hyderabad Cuisine
