= Cafe Bahar =

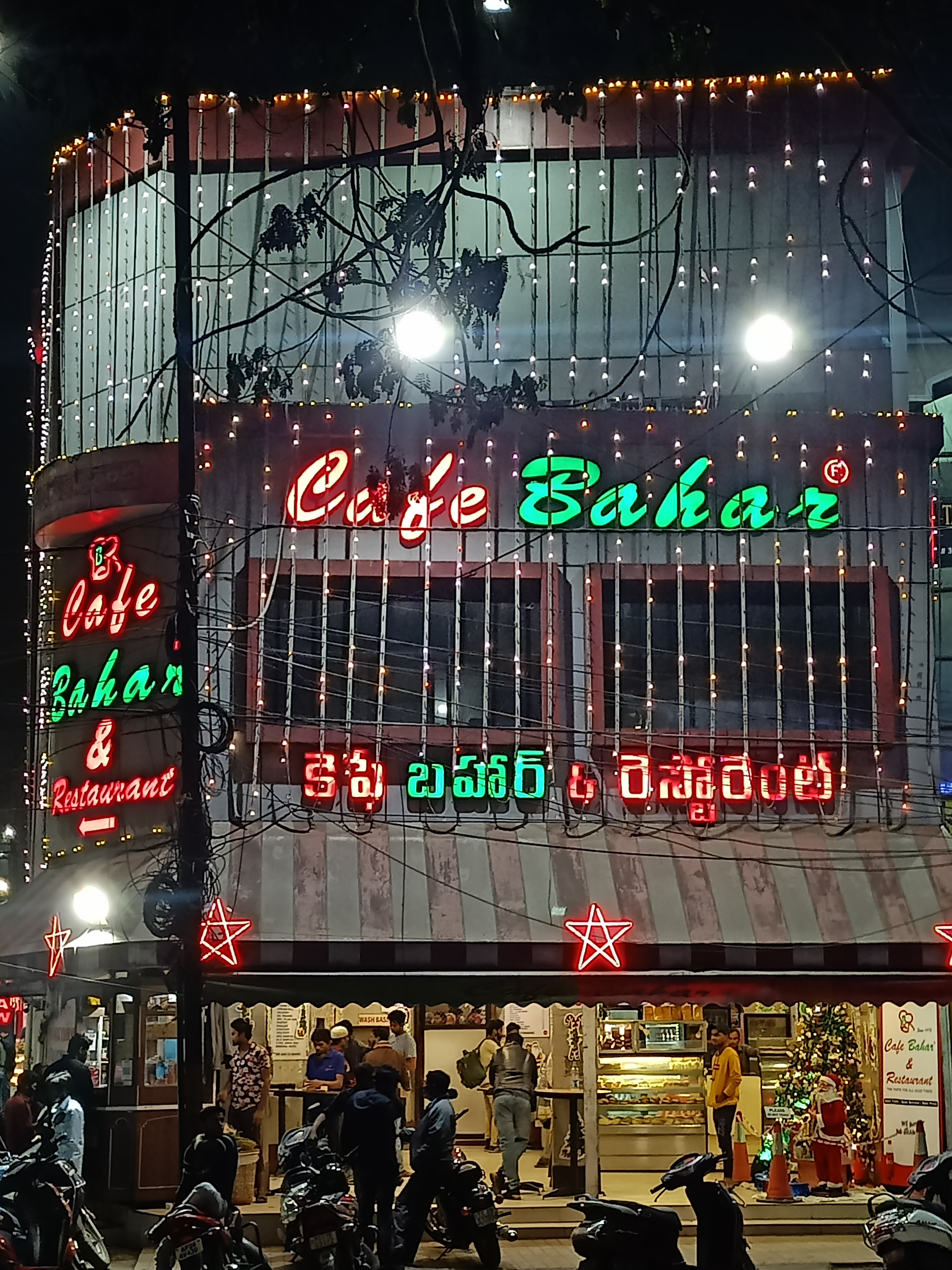
- Restaurant's exterior in 2021
- Interactive map of Cafe Bahar

Restaurant information
- Established: 1973
- Owners: Syed Hussian Bolooki; Syed Ali Asghar Bolooki
- Food type: Hyderabadi cuisine
- Dress code: casual
- Location: 3-5, 815/A, Old MLA Quarters Rd, Avanti Nagar, Himayatnagar, Hyderabad, Telangana, 500 029, India
- Coordinates: 17°23′59″N 78°28′40″E

Cafe Bahar is a prominent and historically significant restaurant located in Basheerbagh area of Hyderabad, in the state of Telangana, India, specifically near the Old MLA Quarters and Hyderguda cross-roads. Initially established as a modest Irani café, it has evolved into a popular landmark, particularly renowned for its authentic Hyderabadi biryani, Hyderabadi haleem and traditional Irani Chai.

== History ==
Cafe Bahar was established in 1973 at its primary location in Basheerbagh (near Hyderguda), Hyderabad. The cafe was founded by Syed Hussian Bolooki, an Iranian who had settled in Hyderabad after moving from Mumbai (Bombay). His family had originally arrived in India from Iran around 1934 and settled in Mumbai, where they operated a restaurant called Shapour.

The establishment initially began as a small-scale Irani cafe and a provisional store, primarily serving tea, coffee, and light snacks. At the time of its opening, a cup of tea cost 15 paise and an Irani samosa cost 5 paise. It gained popularity as a gathering spot, offering affordable and high-quality Irani Chai and Osmania biscuits.

Over the decades, Cafe Bahar transformed from a humble cafe into a full-fledged restaurant, significantly expanding its menu to include a wide range of Hyderabadi cuisine, most notably the Hyderabadi dum biryani. It has since acquired a cult following among locals and is recognized as one of the city's iconic food destinations.

== Controversies ==
Cafe Bahar has been involved in several public and legal issues, primarily related to health standards and internal management.

=== Pricing Dispute ===
In 2019, the restaurant was named in a consumer complaint for allegedly overcharging for bottled water and soft drinks above the Maximum Retail Price (MRP). The restaurant defended its pricing by citing legal precedents allowing certain high-end hotels and restaurants to charge above the MRP for products served on their premises.

=== Unhygienic Conditions ===
In 2019, the Greater Hyderabad Municipal Corporation (GHMC) reportedly conducted raids on the restaurant's kitchen. The inspection resulted in a fine being levied for alleged maintenance of unhygienic conditions, including sanitation issues and lack of proper waste segregation.

=== Family Dispute and Temporary Closure ===
In late 2024, the restaurant faced a significant internal crisis when a family feud erupted among the founder's heirs over the management and distribution of assets. The dispute led to the complete, temporary closure of the restaurant — the first in its history. The matter reached the Supreme Court of India. The family was split into two factions, with a majority group led by Syed Ali Asghar Bolooki (holding an 86% share) and a minority group led by another partner (holding 14%). The Supreme Court eventually intervened, reappointing Syed Ali Asghar Bolooki as the receiver to manage daily affairs and mandating an independent valuation of the firm to proceed with a settlement. The restaurant was subsequently reopened, with an arbitrator appointed to resolve ongoing disputes.
