= Yazdani Bakery =

Indian Food & products company

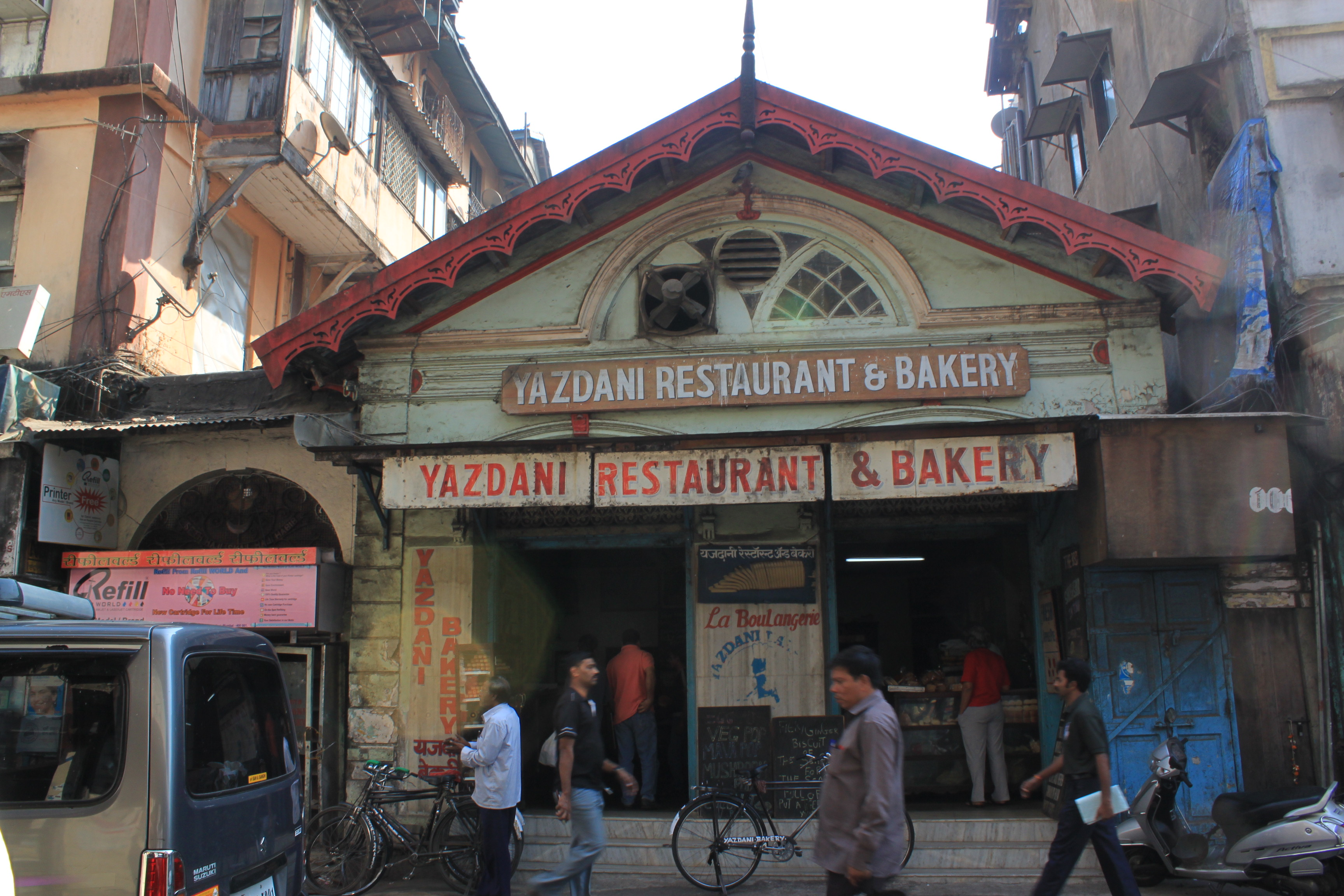

- Location within Mumbai

Restaurant information
- Food type: Bakery and snacks
- Location: Fort, Mumbai, Maharashtra, India
- Coordinates: 18.933°N 72.833°E

Yazdani Bakery is an Irani cafe and Persian style bakery in Mumbai, India. As of 2023, it was a take-out establishment with the sit-down service closed.

== History ==
The bakery was opened in 1953 by Zend Meherwan Zend, an Irani baker.

All products in the bakery are handmade, and baked in diesel ovens. The bakery draws a lot of visitors, particularly international visitors especially Germans. The building, built in the early 20th century, was originally a Japanese bank, which was later sold off.

On 11 December 2007, Maharashtra governor SM Krishna presented the Urban Heritage & Citizens Award.

== Gallery ==
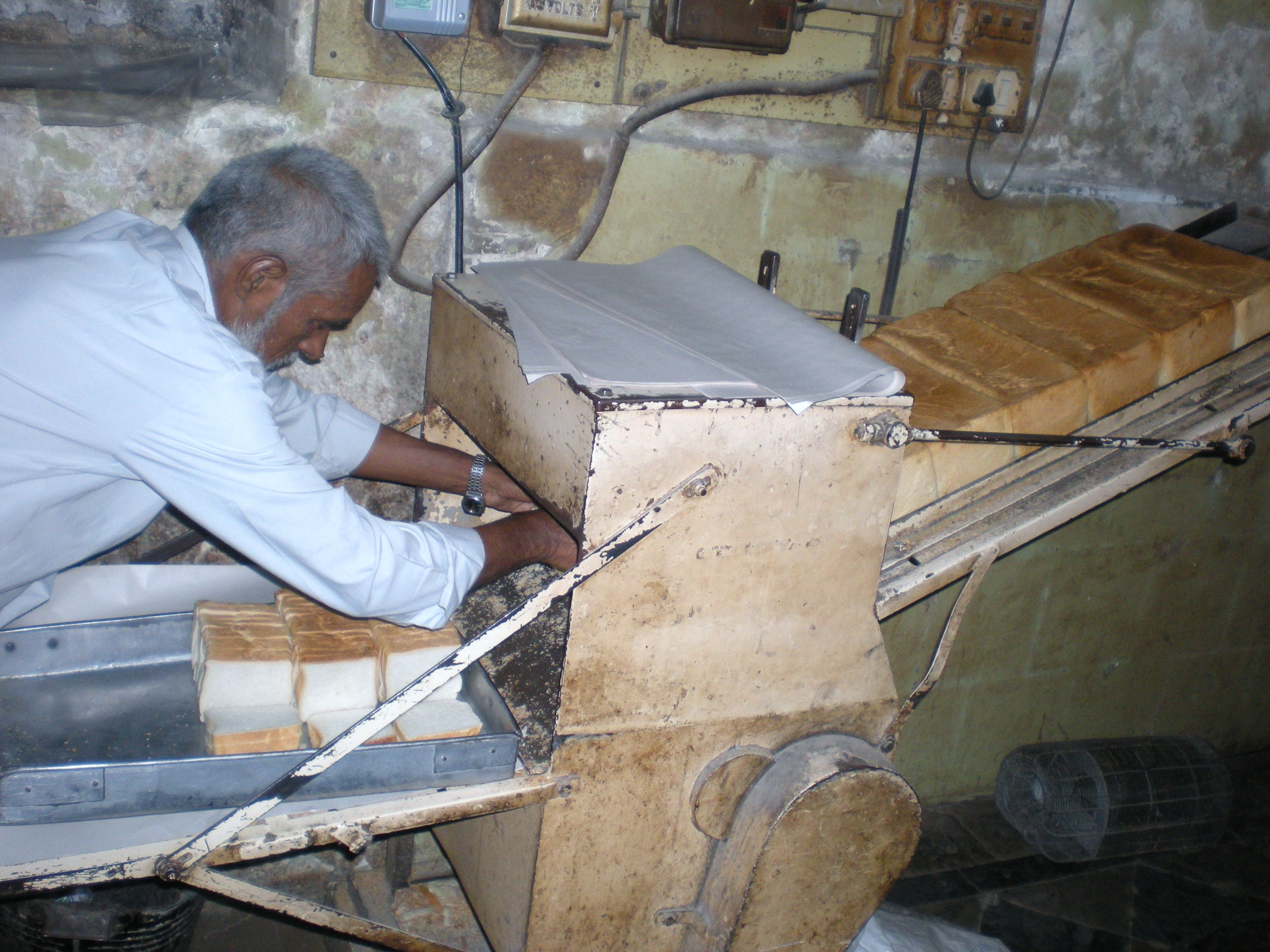
A worker using a bread slicing machine to slice loaves of bread

Video of a bread slicing machine in use at the bakery

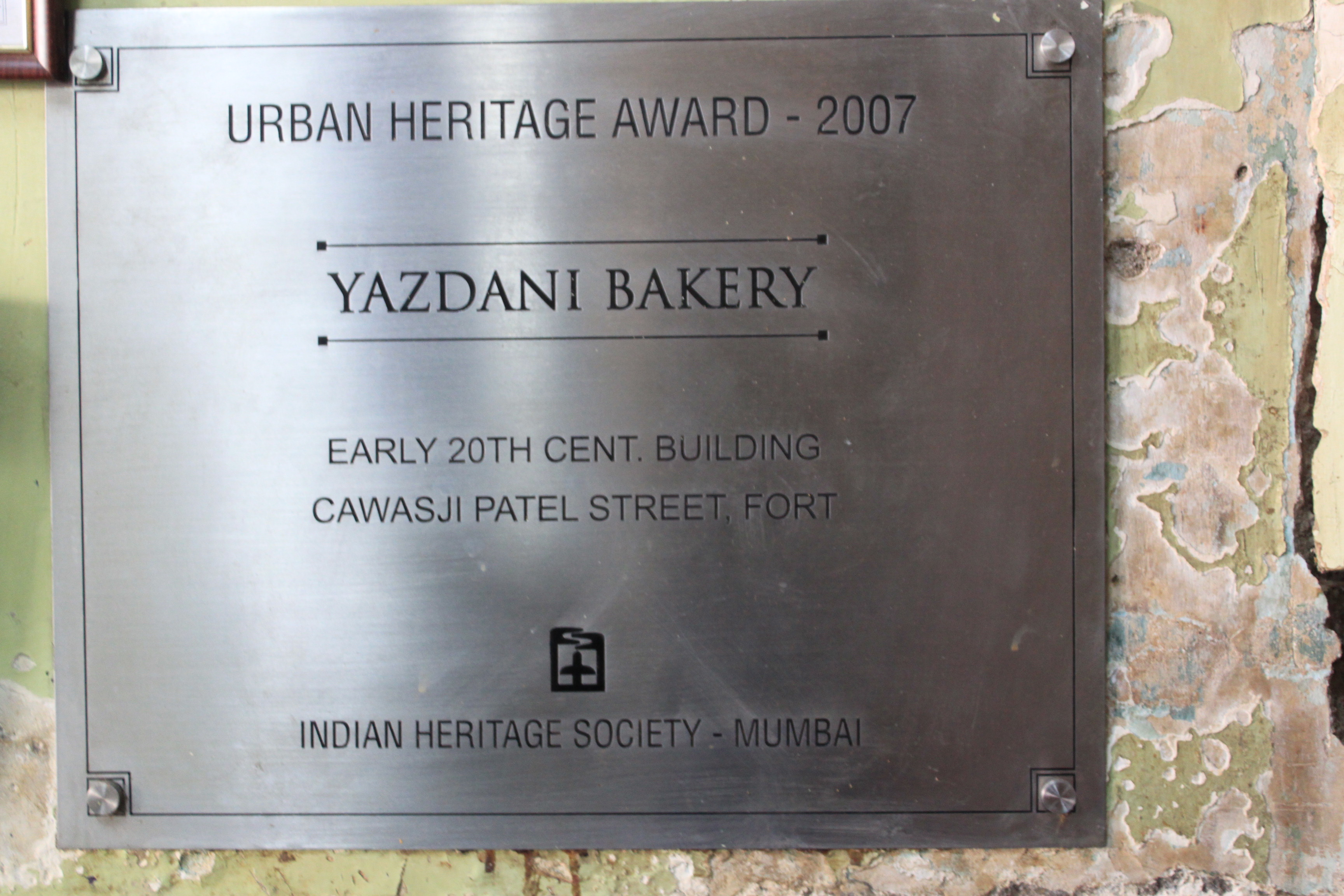
A plaque commemorating Yazdani Bakery's 2007 Urban Heritage Award

== See also ==
- List of bakeries
- Irani café
