= Bank Top =

Bank Top can be one of the following places:

- Bank Top, Tyne and Wear
- Bank Top, West Yorkshire, a settlement in Calderdale
- Darlington railway station, also known as Bank Top
