= Egg bhurji =

Scrambled eggs dish

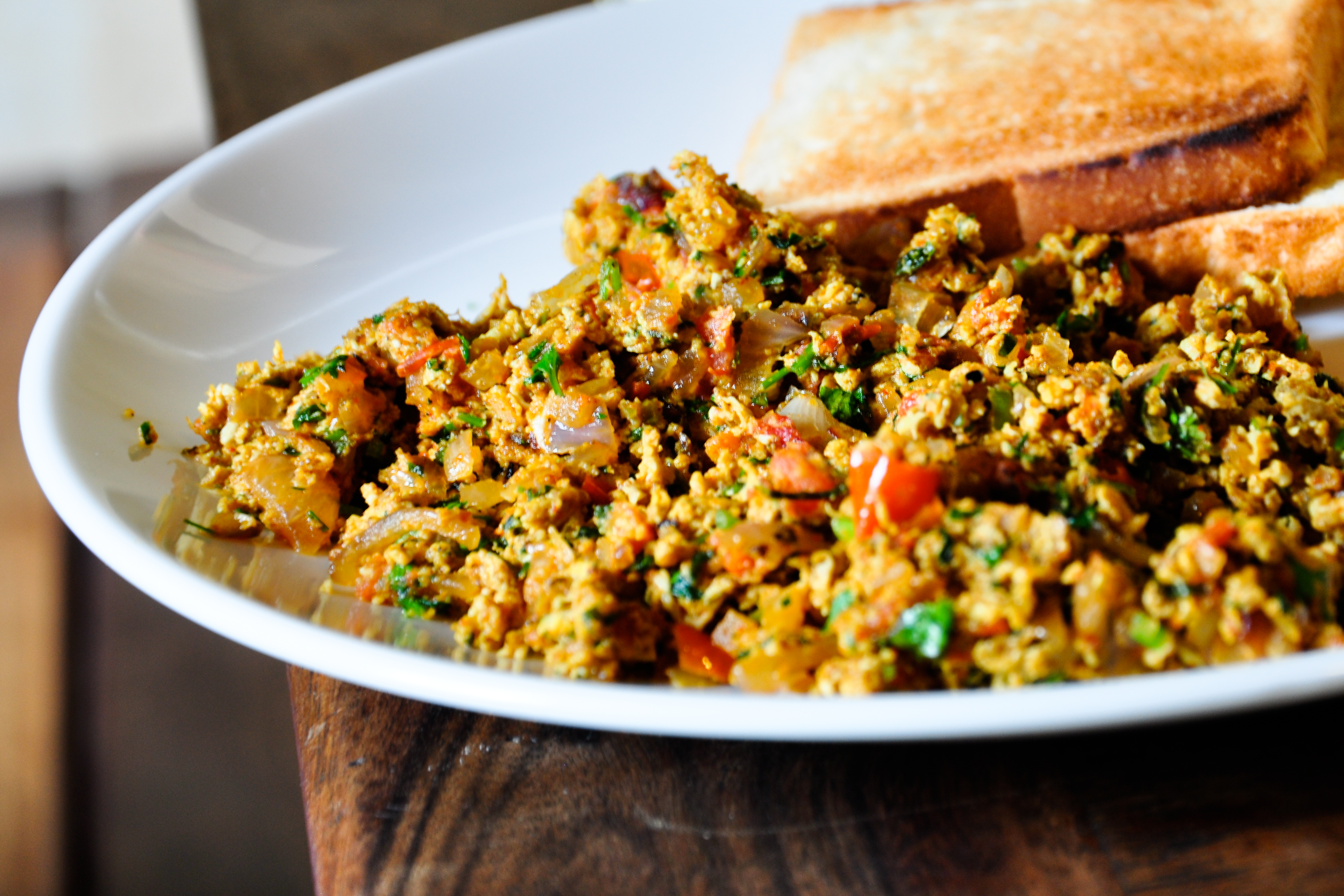
- Egg Bhurjee (Hindi - Anda Bhurjee)
- Alternative names: Anda Bhurji, Ande ka Khagina
- Place of origin: Indian subcontinent
- Main ingredients: Eggs, onions, chilies, spices

Egg bhurji, also known as Anda Bhurji or Ande ka Khagina, is a scrambled eggs dish which is a popular street food and a breakfast, lunch or dinner recipe. Originating from the Indian subcontinent, it is sometimes compared with the Parsi dish akuri. The Parsi dish Akoori or Akuri is very similar to egg bhurji with a few differences. Just like bhurji, akuri is filled with many aromatics like ginger, onion and other spices. However, bhurji eggs are cooked until dry, whereas akoori eggs are cooked less while still runny. The difference lies in its preparation and addition of sautéed chopped onions, chilies and optional spices.

Bhurji can be found at highway rest stops and street food stalls across India, sometimes served alongside slices of white bread. Heavy with tomatoes, chilies, onions, and fragrant spices, these scrambled eggs make for a substantial and satisfying meal in a matter of minutes. Egg bhurji goes well with hot chapati, parathas, dinner rolls or buttered toast.
