= Ali Nawaz Jung Bahadur =

Indian engineer

Mir Ahmed Ali - میر احمد علی

Personal details
- Born: 11 July 1877 Hyderabad, Hyderabad State (now in Telangana)
- Education: Nizam College
- Occupation: Engineer
- Profession: Engineer

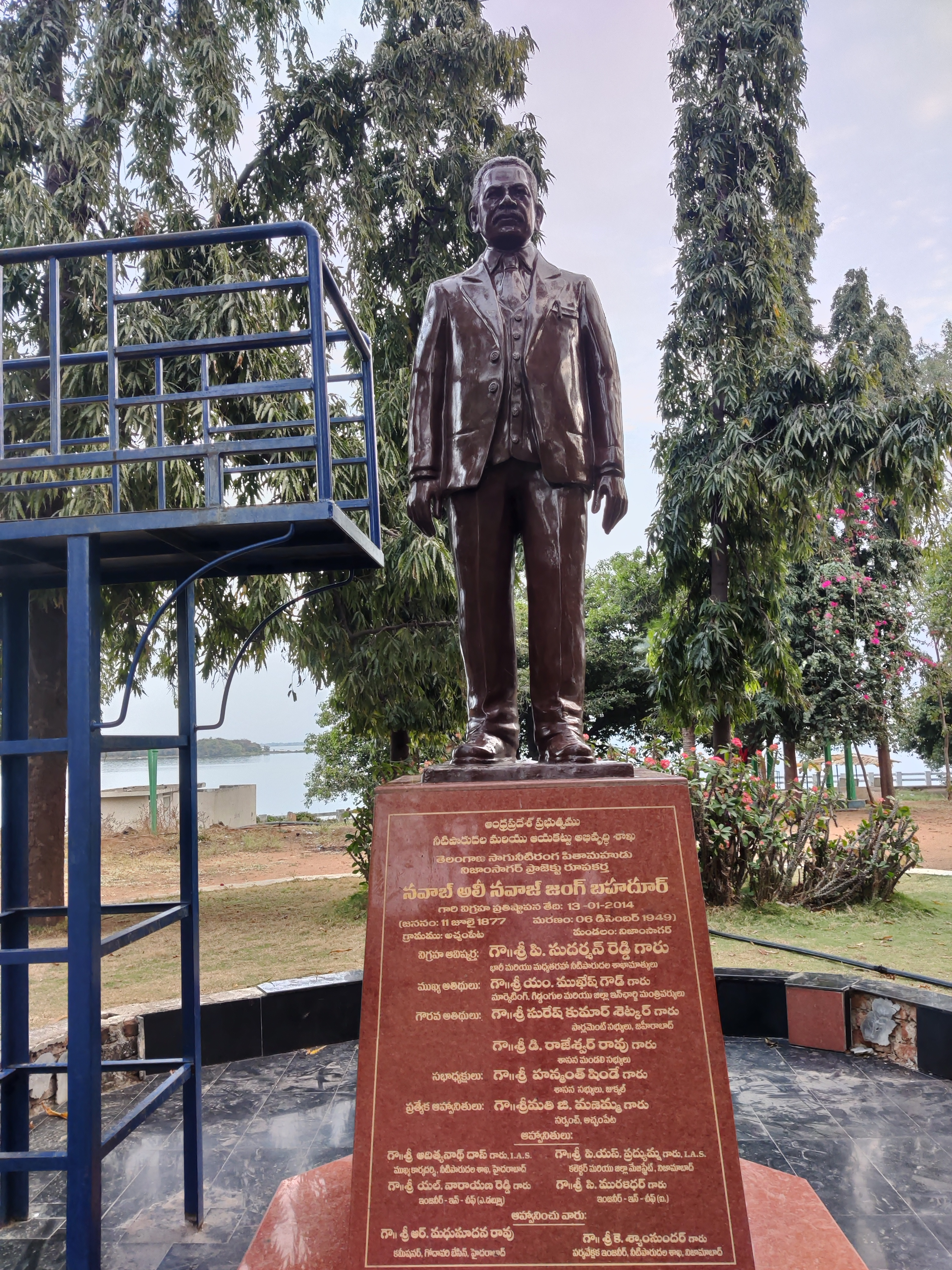
Nawab Ali Nawaz Jung Bahadur Statue

Mir Ahmed Ali, Nawab Ali Nawaz Jung Bahadur (Urdu: میر احمد علی نواب علی نواز جنگ بہادر; born 11 July 1877) was chief engineer during the rule of Nizam of Hyderabad. He was responsible for major irrigation works, buildings and bridges in Hyderabad State such as Osman Sagar, Nizam Sagar Himayat Sagar and Ali Sagar reservoir of Nizamabad district, also named after him. He served as a chairman of National Planning Committee on River training and Irrigation. Since 2014, Government of Telangana announced that his birthday 11 July will be observed as Telangana Engineer's day.

== Personal life and career ==
His father, Mir waiz Ali, was Assistant Secretary of Daftar-e-Mulki. He studied at St. George's Grammar School, Madrasa-i-Aliya and then joined Nizam College in Hyderabad. In 1896 he was sent to England on State scholarship to the famous engineering college of Cooper's Hill College where he had an exceptionally brilliant career, topping the list of successful candidates and gained several scholarships in various branches of engineering.

He returned to Hyderabad in 1899 and joined the Public Works Department as an assistant engineer. In 1913 he was made the secretary to the Government P.W.D. and Telephones Department. In 1918, he became chief engineer and secretary. In 1929, he was invited by the Bombay Government to report in collaboration with Sir M. Visvesvaraya on the financial and technical aspects of Sukkur Barrage, and his services were acknowledged by the Bombay Government.

During his tenure as chief engineer, large irrigation works were conceived, launched and executed. Nawab Saheb was responsible for construction of several buildings and bridges including major bridges over the Godavari and the Manjira River. Extension of telephone service to the districts was due to his initiative. He was responsible for large irrigation projects viz., Wyra, Paler, the Fateh Nahar, and bridges. One of his prize design projects was the Nizamsagar dam.

The Hyderabad House in Delhi was also designed and constructed under his supervision. The question of allocation of waters of the Tungabhadra and the Krishna was sorted out by Nawab Saheb between Madras and Hyderabad governments. His handling of the difficult problem was remarkable. In 1930, the Madras Government conceded to Nizam Government the right of utilizing 50% waters of the river. He was one of the most brilliant engineers Hyderabad has ever produced and Ali Sagar in Nizamabad was named after him.
