= Centenary Methodist Church, Hyderabad =

MCI-Centenary Methodist Church
- MCI-Centenary Methodist Church
- Country: India
- Denomination: Methodism
- Churchmanship: Low Church

Administration
- Diocese: Hyderabad Regional Conference

Clergy
- Priest(s): Rev. GD Anil Kumar(Pastor), Rev. K.L. John Wesley(Associate Pastor), Rev. H.S. Herbert(Associate Pastor) and Rev.D. Chandraiah(Associate Pastor) - (Telugu Church Pastors)

MCI-Centenary Methodist Church is a church compound located at Chapel road, Abids housing two of the most prominent churches in the city. It is a Protestant Church and is under the auspices of Methodist Church in India. It was built in the 1950s in order to accommodate the increasing number of Methodists in the city. It is currently the largest church in Hyderabad in terms of seating capacity. The church shares its premises with its predecessor the Methodist chapel which was built in 1877. This church which is popularly known as the Methodist Chapel of Chapel Road was established by the missionaries of the Methodist Episcopal Church. The church offers services in Telugu, English, Hindi, Marathi and Kannada.

== History ==
The Methodists began their missionary activities in the Deccan region of India in the mid-1800s. The South India Conference of the Methodists was also held in Hyderabad in 1884. The Methodist chapel was built much earlier, in 1877, and has the distinction of being the oldest Christian religious structure in the city. Due to its small size, it was never referred to as a church; it is still referred to as a chapel. The much larger Centenary Methodist church was built in the 1970s in order to accommodate the growing number of Methodists in the city. The church now caters to a cosmopolitan group of Methodists, who speak Telugu (the largest) followed by English, Hindi, Marathi, and Kannada.

== Architecture ==
=== Methodist Chapel ===
The Methodist chapel is a small whitewashed Neo-Gothic Structure. The chapel features a multitude of spires and Gothic buttresses. The walls of the chapel also feature several plaques commemorating the services of several missionaries that worked in the region. The church also has a large stained glass window as its altarpiece.

=== Centenary Methodist Church ===
This is a much larger roomier church that can accommodate more than 2000 people. The church is a stone masonry structure subscribing to the contemporary style of architecture. It has a wide and lofty nave with a balcony. The church also has a tall and pointed bell tower that is prominently visible in the surrounding areas.

== Services ==
Sundays :

- 6:00 a.m (Telugu Service) (Methodist Church)
- 7:30 a.m (English Service) (Methodist Chapel)
- 7:30 a.m (Hindi Service) (Methodist Church)
- 9:00 a.m (Kannada Service) (Methodist Church)
- 10:30 a.m (Telugu Service) (Methodist Church)
- 11:30 a.m (Marathi Service) (Methodist Chapel)
- 6:00 p.m (English Service) (Methodist Church)

== Institutions ==
- Stanley Girls High School
- Methodist Boys High School
- Stanley Girls Junior College
- Methodist Boys Junior College
- Stanley Girls Degree College
- Stanley Girls Engineering College
- Methodist Boys Engineering College

== Gallery ==
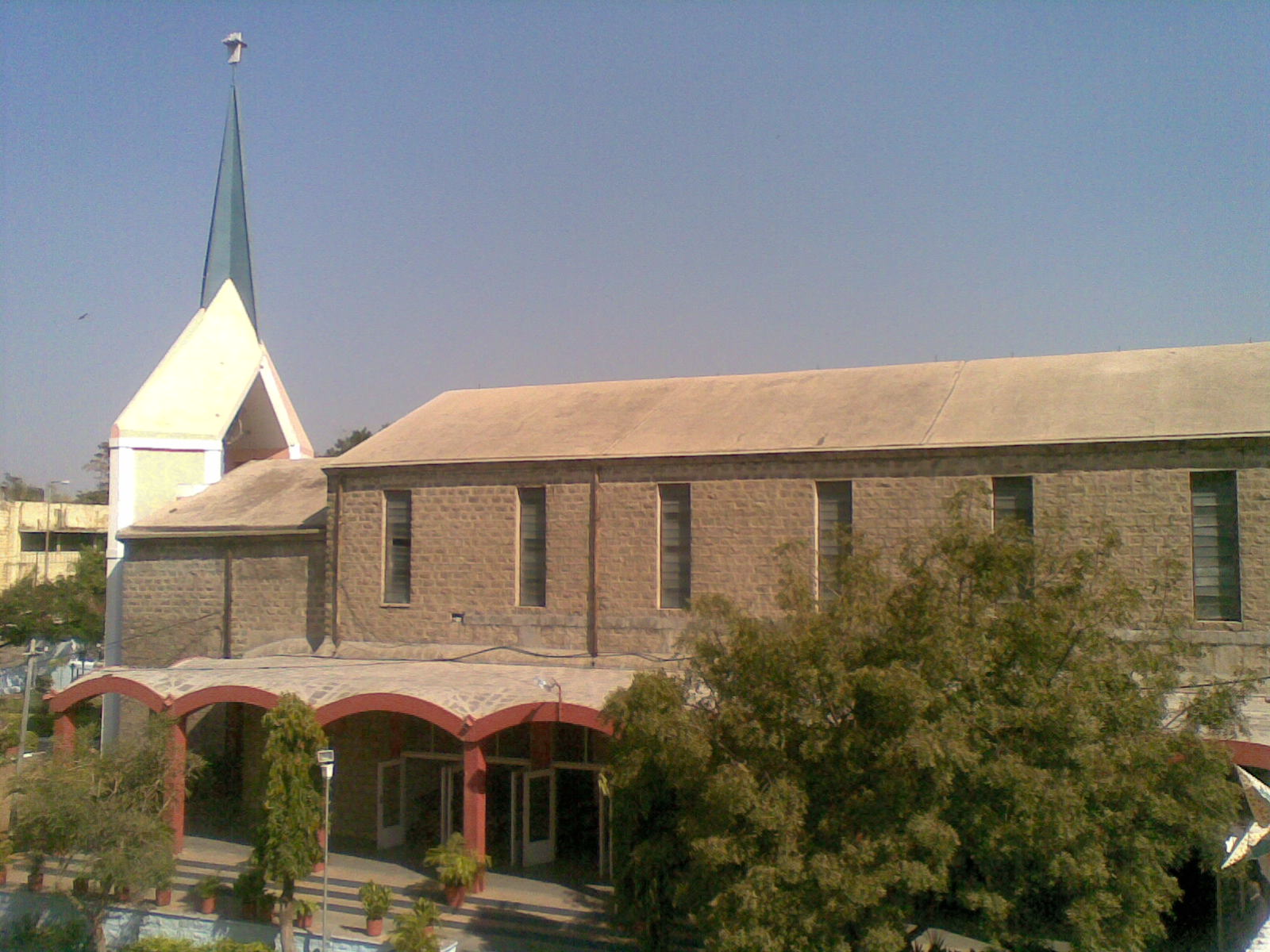
Centenary Methodist Church

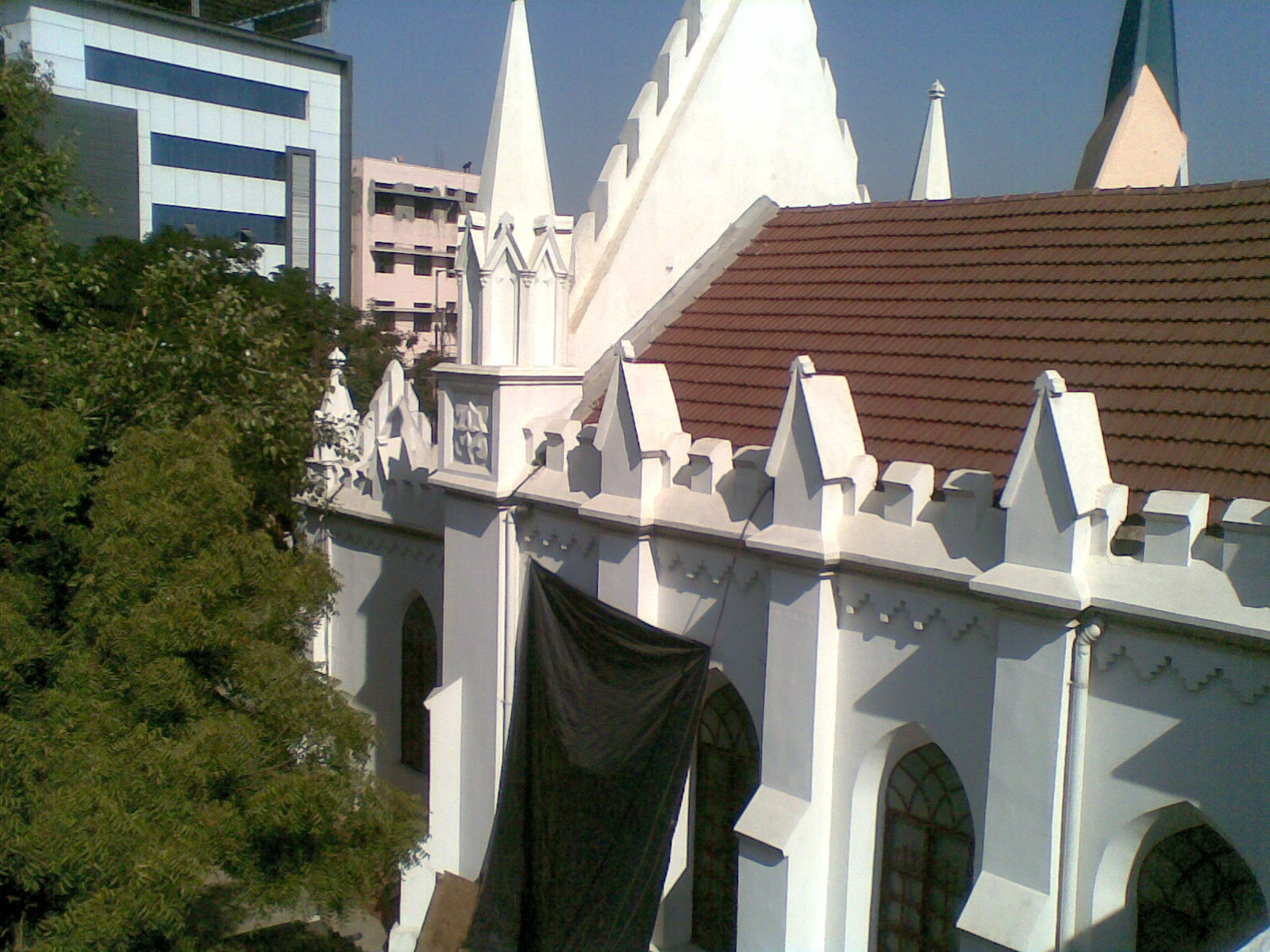
Methodist Chapel

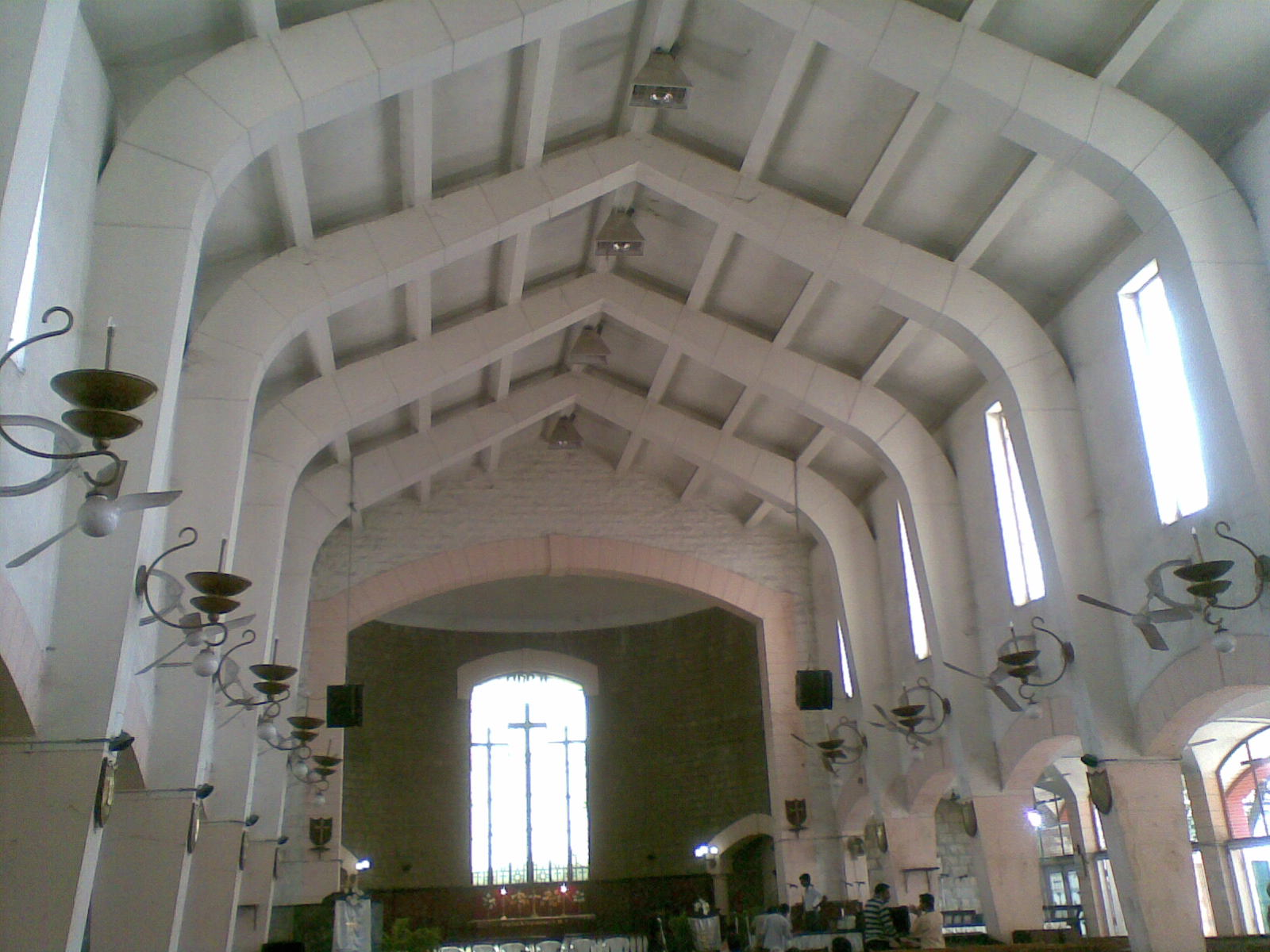
Inside the Centenary Methodist Church

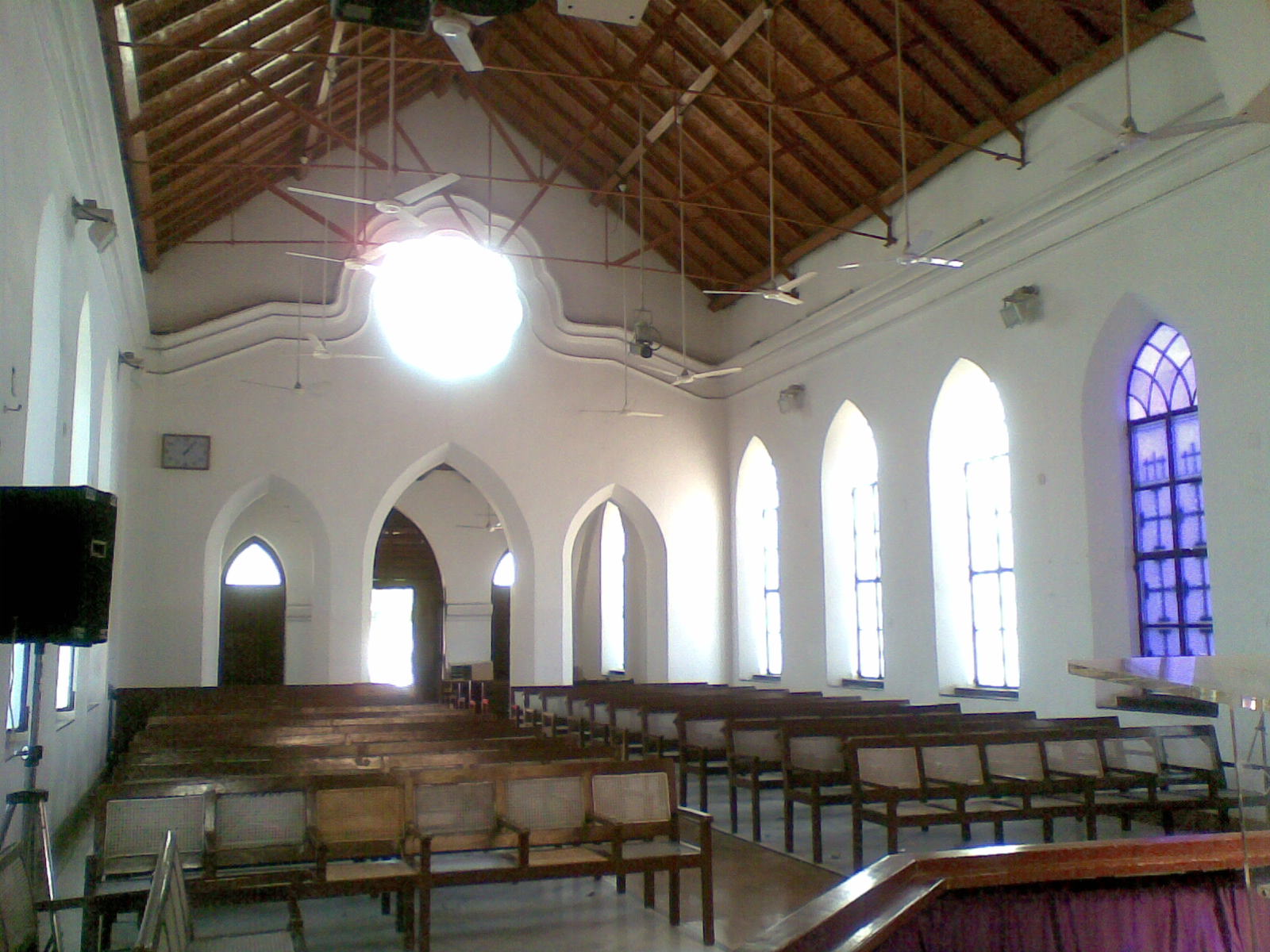
Inside the Methodist Chapel

== See also ==
- List of churches in Secunderabad and Hyderabad
- Telugu Christian
- Methodism
