= Taj Mahal Hotel, Abids =

Taj Mahal Hotel
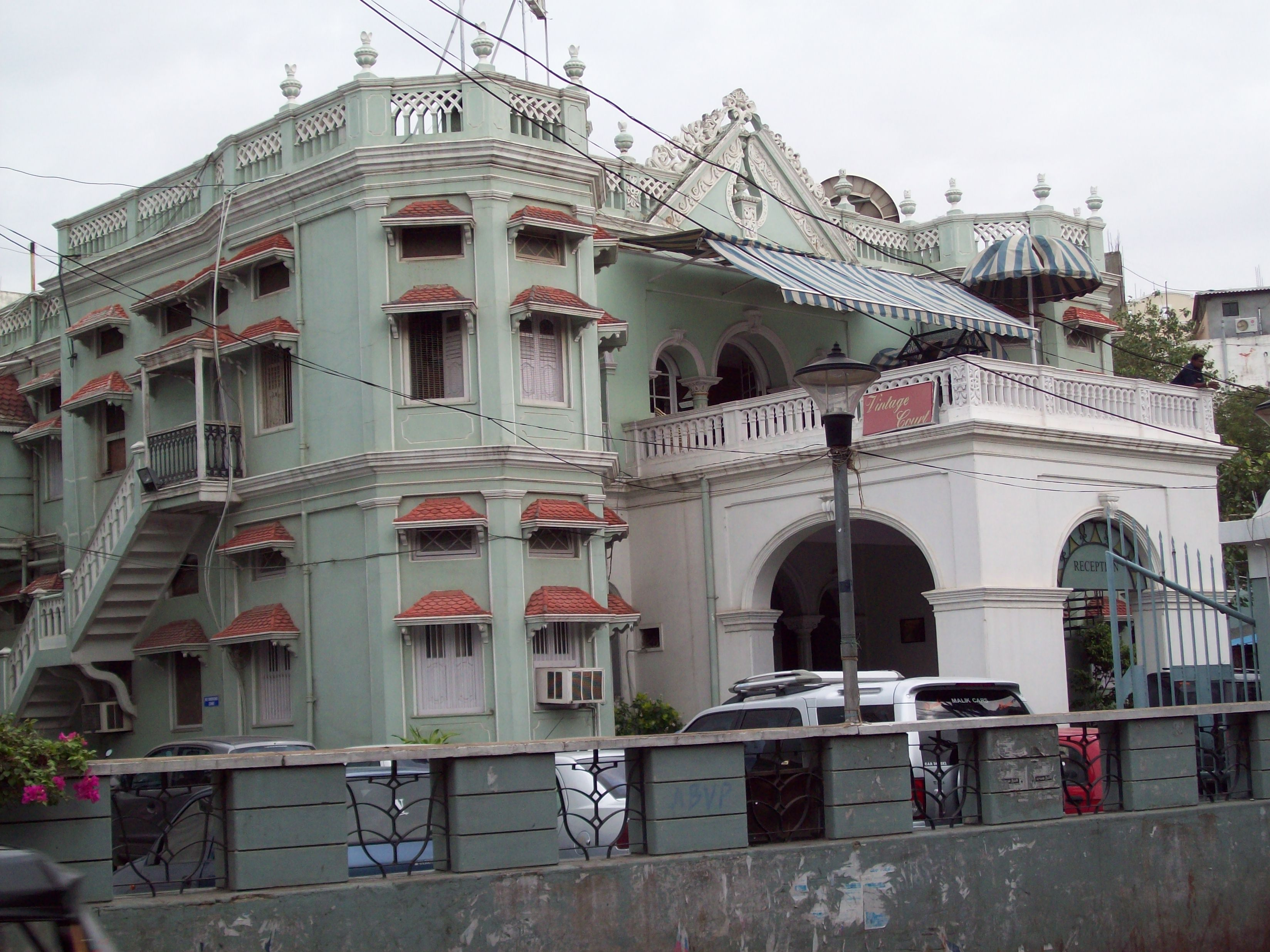
- Hotel Taj Mahal, Abids

General information
- Location: Hyderabad, India
- Construction started: 1950; 76 years ago

Taj Mahal Hotel is a heritage hotel located in Hyderabad, India. It is located at Abids suburb. It is popular for its Udupi cuisine dishes.

== History ==
The Abids branch was established in the 1948 by two friends Anand Rao and Babu Rao along with Babu Rao's brother Sundar Rao.

== Restaurant ==
The restaurant serves vegetarian Udupi cuisine dishes.

== Building ==
The building was declared a heritage structure by the HMDA.
