= St. George's Grammar School (Hyderabad) =

Location
- Gunfoundry, Abids, Hyderabad, Telangana, 500001; India

Information
- School type: Christian missionary
- Motto: Perseverantia Omnia Vincit (Perseverance Conquers All Things)
- Denomination: Anglican
- Patron saint: St. George
- Founded: 1834; 192 years ago
- Founder: British officers, Nizam of Hyderabad
- School district: Hyderabad
- Oversight: Medak Diocese, Church of South India
- Language: English
- Campus type: Urban
- Colours: Maroon and Grey
- Accreditation: ICSE, ISC
- Affiliation: CISCE
- Website: stgeorgesgrammar.in

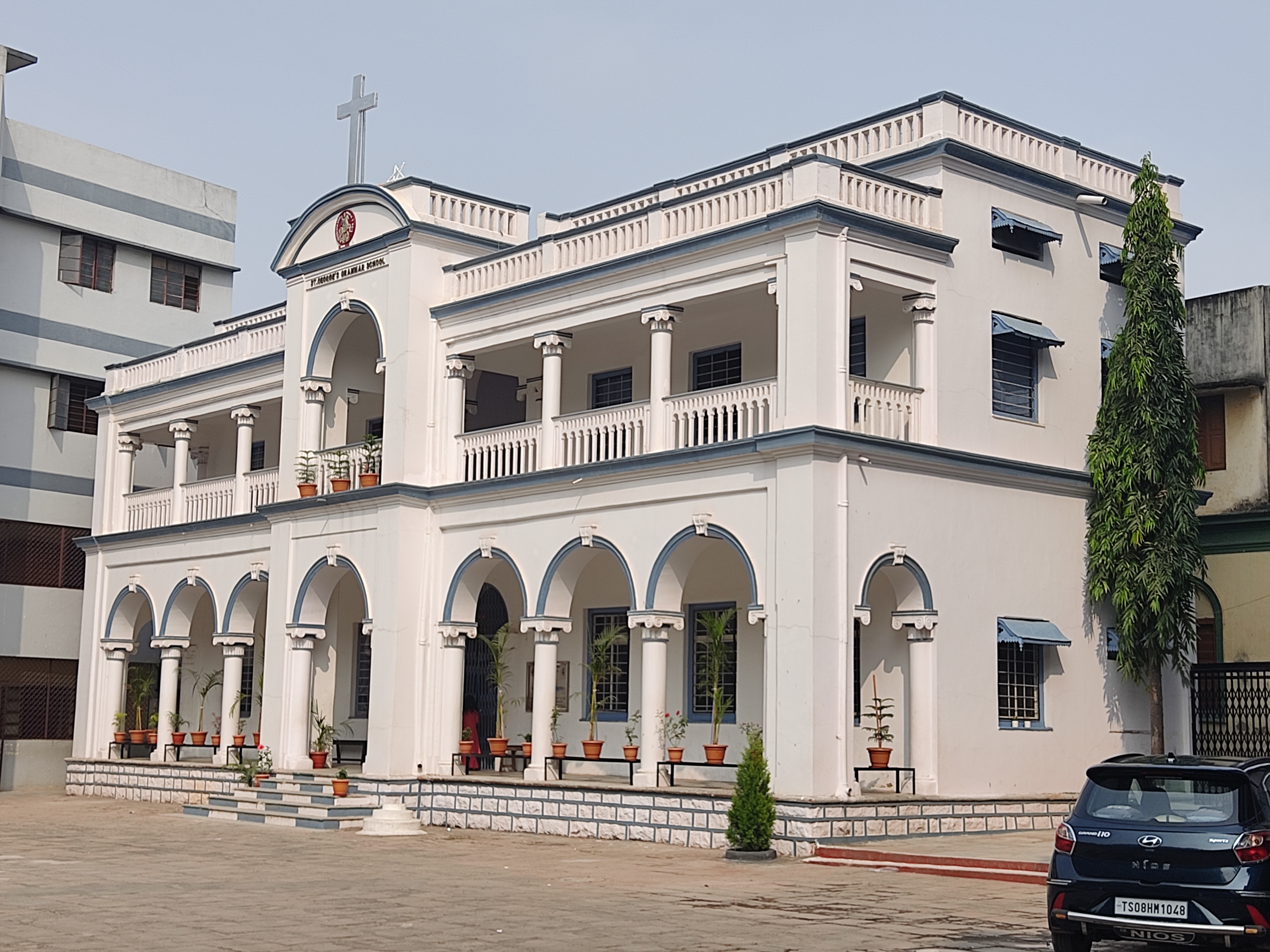
Main building of the boys' school

St. George's Grammar School is a private school located at Abids, Hyderabad. It is affiliated to the Council for the Indian School Certificate Examinations.

== History ==
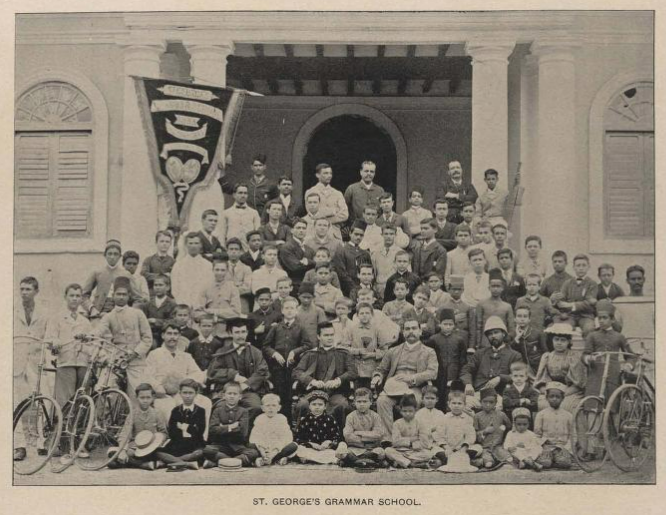
Students of the St. George's Grammar School

The school was established in 1834, named Hyderabad Residency School, to cater for the educational needs of the children of the British community serving the government in Hyderabad. It is the oldest English medium school of the city and one of the oldest in India.

In 1867 the school changed its name to The Chudderghat Protestant School, and in 1891 to St. George's Grammar School. In 1865 a separate girls' school was established, the first in Hyderabad.

In 1918, the management of the school was handed to the Australian Christian Mission Seminary. After Indian independence in 1947, the school was handed to the Church of South India.

== Notable alumni ==
- Ali Nawaz Jung Bahadur
- Ausaf Sayeed, Diplomat
- Syed Abid Ali, cricketer
- Mirza Hameeduallah Beg
- Parvez Dewan
- Hasan Gafoor
- Abid Hasan
- Idris Hasan Latif
- Sarojini Naidu
- Suresh Oberoi
- K. T. Rama Rao
- Rakesh Sharma
- Rasheeduddin Khan
- Vinai Thummalapalli

== See also ==
- Church of South India
- List of schools in India
