= Bank Street, Hyderabad =

Bank Street
- neighbourhood
- Location in Telangana, India Bank Street (Telangana) Bank Street (India)
- Coordinates: 17.38584°N 78.479347°E
- Country: India
- State: Telangana
- District: Hyderabad

Government
  - Body: GHMC

Languages
  - Official: Telugu
- Time zone: UTC+5:30 (IST)
- PIN: 500 001
- Vehicle registration: TG
- Lok Sabha constituency: Hyderabad
- Vidhan Sabha constituency: Maharajgunj
- Planning agency: GHMC
- Website: telangana.gov.in

Bank Street is a major commercial suburb in Hyderabad, India. A large number of banks are located in this street, including SBI, Central Bank, Canara Bank, Andhra Bank, etc. It has a big park located and is famous for its Blood Bank. It connects Abids and Chaderghat.

== Commercial area ==
There are many electronics shops here and Gujarati Galli has more concentration of such shops. There is a popular sweets shop called as Bombay Halwa. There is a popular Irani cafe here called Grand Hotel here. It also is home to an old Government run hospital ENT Hospital. Also has a very old bar since the time of the Nizams called as Rustum Fram.

== Transport ==
The TSRTC has a major bus hub in this area and connects Bank street with all parts of the city. The closest MMTS Train station is at Nampally. Also the new Hyderabad metro is also nearer to it . Osmania medical college metro station is the preferable least distance site to bank street
