= Abids =

Abids Abid Road
- Inner City
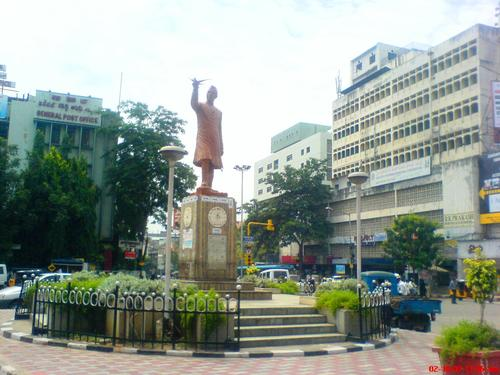
- Abids circle with the Nehru statue, and the GPO in the background

- Location in Telangana, India Abids (Telangana) Abids (India)
- Coordinates: 17.366°N 78.476°E
- Country: India
- State: Telangana
- District: Hyderabad District
- Metro: Hyderabad Metropolitan Region
- Named for: Ali Abid

Government
  - Body: GHMC

Languages
  - Official: Telugu
- Time zone: UTC+5:30 (IST)
- PIN: 500 001
- Vehicle registration: TG
- Lok Sabha constituency: Hyderabad
- Vidhan Sabha constituency: Khairtabad
- Planning agency: GHMC
- Website: telangana.gov.in

Abids is a major commercial center in Hyderabad, India. Abids is well known as the oldest and most famous business area in Hyderabad. The state government building (TSFC), and the President Plaza, Badshah palace are located here. Unlike most markets which are known for specializing in a certain trade, a variety of businesses are located here. This area's importance has increased because of its close proximity to Nampally Railway Station.

It is surrounded by Basheerbagh to the north, Nampally to the west via Chapel Road, Koti to the East, and Chaderghat to the south, via the Bank Street. It falls under Nampally constituency.

== History ==
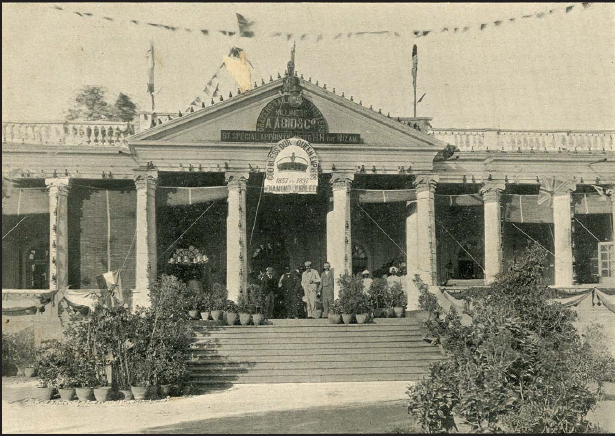
Abids Departmental store in 1897

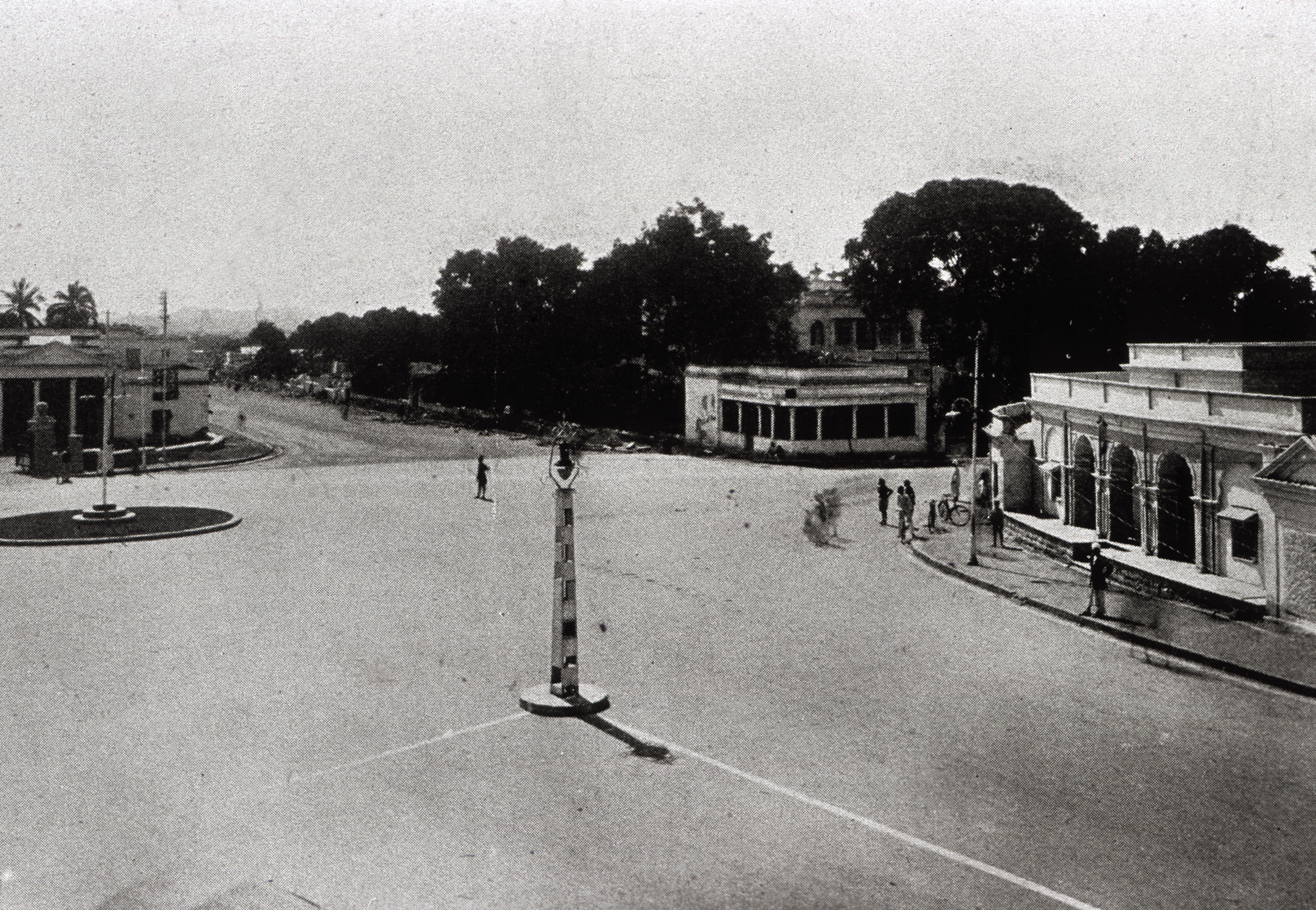
Abids Circle circa 1934

The St. George's Grammar School (established in 1834), and the adjoining St. George's Church (established in 1844) predate the area's naming.

This area had a shop known as Abid's belonging to an Armenian merchant known as Albert Abid, a valet of Nizam VI of Hyderabad state, hence the area came to be known as Abids. Albert Abid left for England, but as per another version the area got its name after a shop run by Abid Evans.

Urban designers pass a statement saying, “Abids is dead” or “Abids is no more”. Though the activity in Abids has gone through a considerable decrease, it still holds its essence and has a wide scope for its revival.

In 1939, the store was demolished and a cinema known as "Palace Talkies" was built in its place. Later in the 1980s this theater was also demolished and a new structure built in its place. Now this space is occupied by Big Bazaar.

In 1942, the headquarters of the State Bank of Hyderabad were established here. The Taj Mahal Hotel was built here in the 1950s.

== Commerce ==
Today the whole area is one of the main shopping centres in the city and the main street is known as Abids Road. The General Post Office or GPO headquarters is located in this area. The major businesses are hotels and shops for textiles, clothing, jewelry, footwear, and electronics. BSNL, the largest telecommunications provider in the city, has its headquarters located here. The GHMC office is also located here, situated adjacent to the GPO.

The famous Jagdish market, a bustling grey market for mobiles and electronics, is also located here.

The area is a major business hub and has many restaurants for travellers. Palace Heights, the Taj Mahal Hotel and Grand Hotel are the best restaurants in Abids.

== Culture ==
Some famous temples are located here especially on the Nampally and Abids road, such as the Hanuman Temple and ISKCON which are considered to be heritage sites.. The Centenary Methodist Church, Hyderabad, amongst the oldest churches in South India is located here.

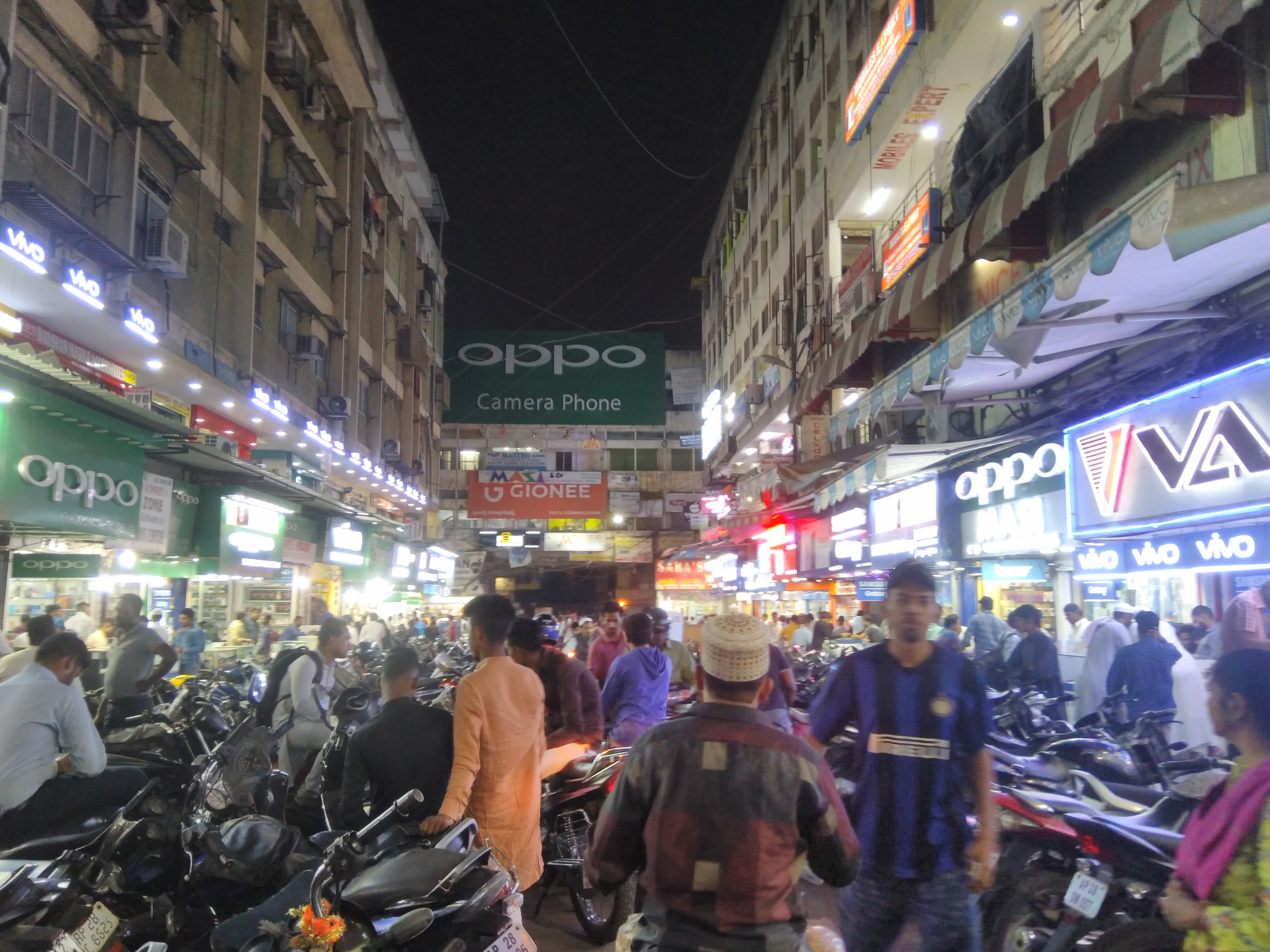
Jagdish Market, Chirag Ali Lane, Abids

== Education ==
Many English medium schools are established in the area.

=== List of Schools ===
- Sujatha High School
- Stanley Girls High School
- St. George's Grammar School
- Little Flower High School
- Rosary Convent High School
- All Saints High School
- Nazareth High School
- Slate the School
- St. John's Grammar School
- Methodist Boys' High School

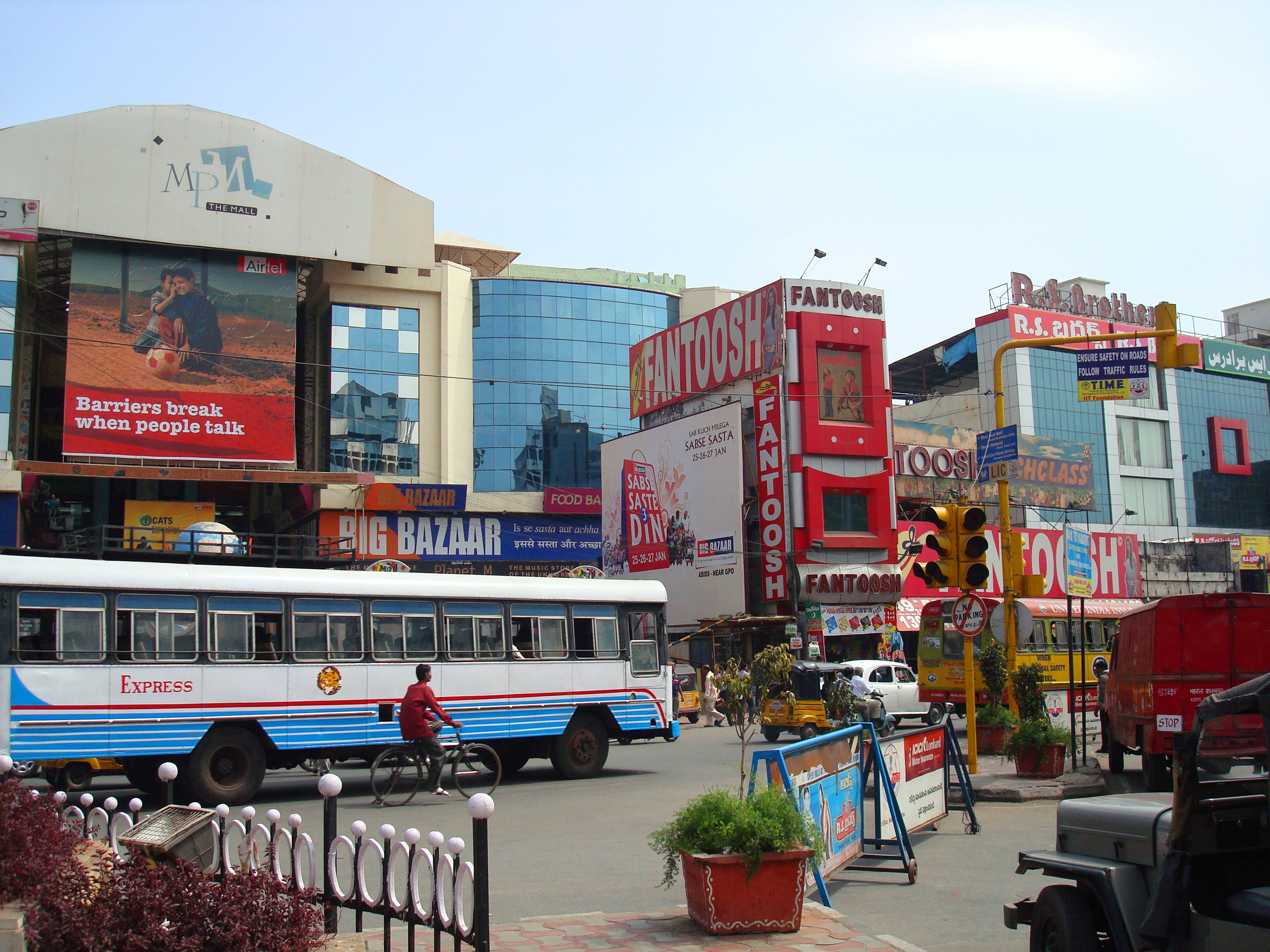
Various shopping outlets in Abids

== Transport ==
The Abids Road is an arterial road of the city, connecting parts of the old city to the new and also to Hyderabad's twin city, Secunderabad, via Tank Bund Road. Abids is well connected by TSRTC buses to Ghatkesar, Kothi, Nampally, Dilsukhnagar and other areas of the city.

The closest MMTS train station is located a kilometer away at the Nampally railway station. Other public modes of transport such as auto-rickshaws and taxis are found aplenty as they keep shuttling between this area and other areas of the city. The nearest metro stations is Nampally Metro Station.
