= Bandonhill =

Coordinates: 51.36360°N 0.133445°W

- Location within Greater London
- London borough: Sutton
- Ceremonial county: Greater London
- Region: London
- Country: England
- Sovereign state: United Kingdom
- Post town: SUTTON
- Postcode district: SM6
- Dialling code: =
- Police: Metropolitan
- Fire: London
- Ambulance: London
- London Assembly: Croydon and Sutton

Bandonhill (sometimes spelt as Bandon Hill) is a small locality in the London Borough of Sutton, located between Wallington and Beddington.

It is best known for Bandon Hill Cemetery, which opened in 1899. Bandon Halt railway station formerly served the area, however this closed in 1914.
