= Akuri =

Parsi Indian spicy scrambled egg dish

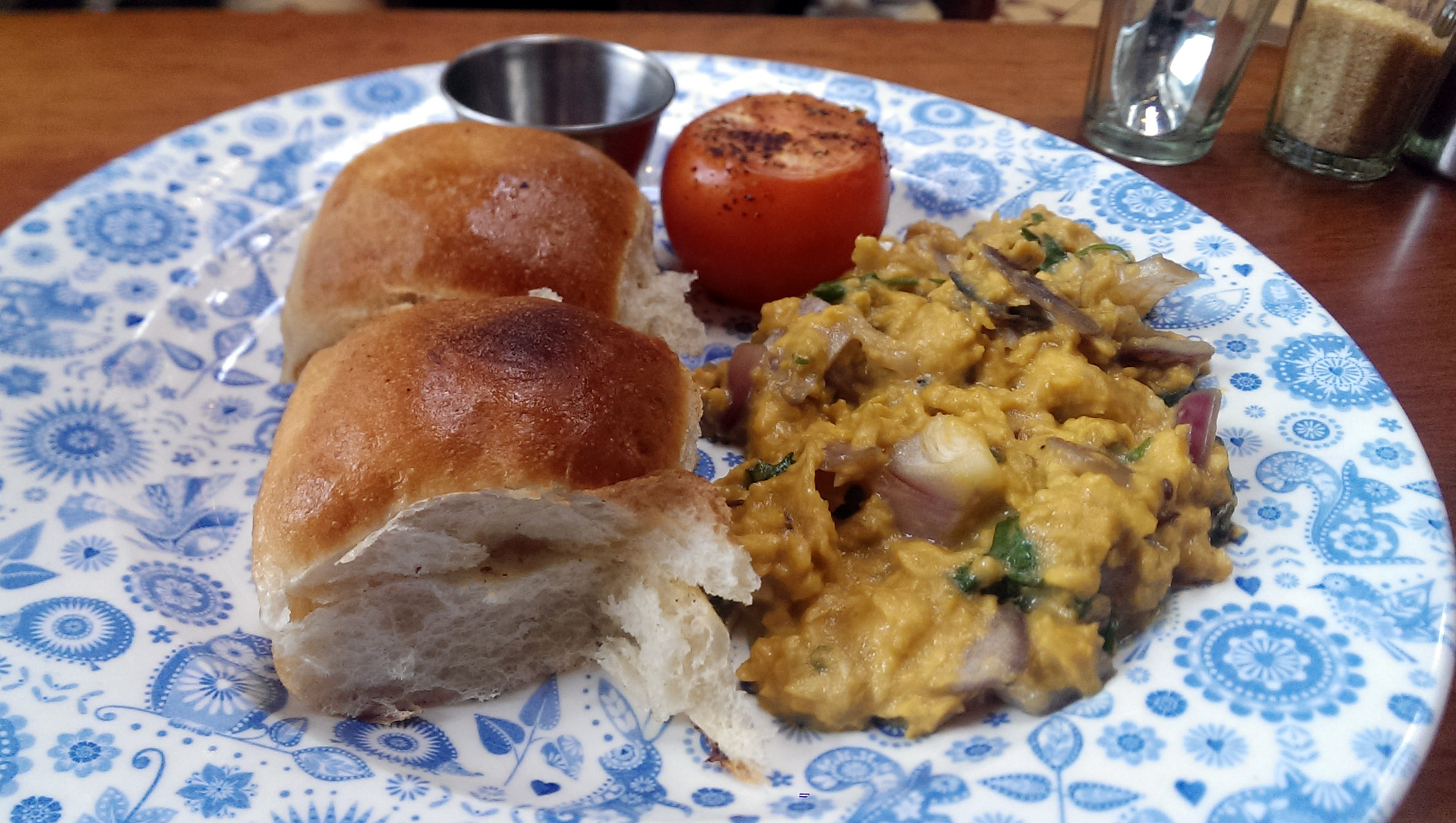
- Akuri served with tomato and bread
- Place of origin: India
- Region or state: Western India
- Associated cuisine: Parsi, Indian
- Main ingredients: scrambled egg

Akuri is a spicy scrambled egg dish eaten in Parsi cuisine of India. Akuri is cooked until almost runny; the eggs are never overcooked. The main flavouring is fried onions and the spices used are ginger, coriander, chopped chilis, and black pepper. Akuri is traditionally eaten with pav or double roti (types of Indian bread).

A less common version of akuri is bharuchi akuri, which contains nuts and dry fruits like cashews, almonds and raisins in addition to the other spices. This dish supposedly originated from the city of Bharuch in Gujarat, hence the name.

Egg bhurji is a similar egg dish eaten in many parts of the Indian subcontinent. Connoisseurs of these Indian scrambled egg varieties would argue that egg bhurjee and akuri are almost identical but distinct in taste.
