= Dhansak =

Parsi curry

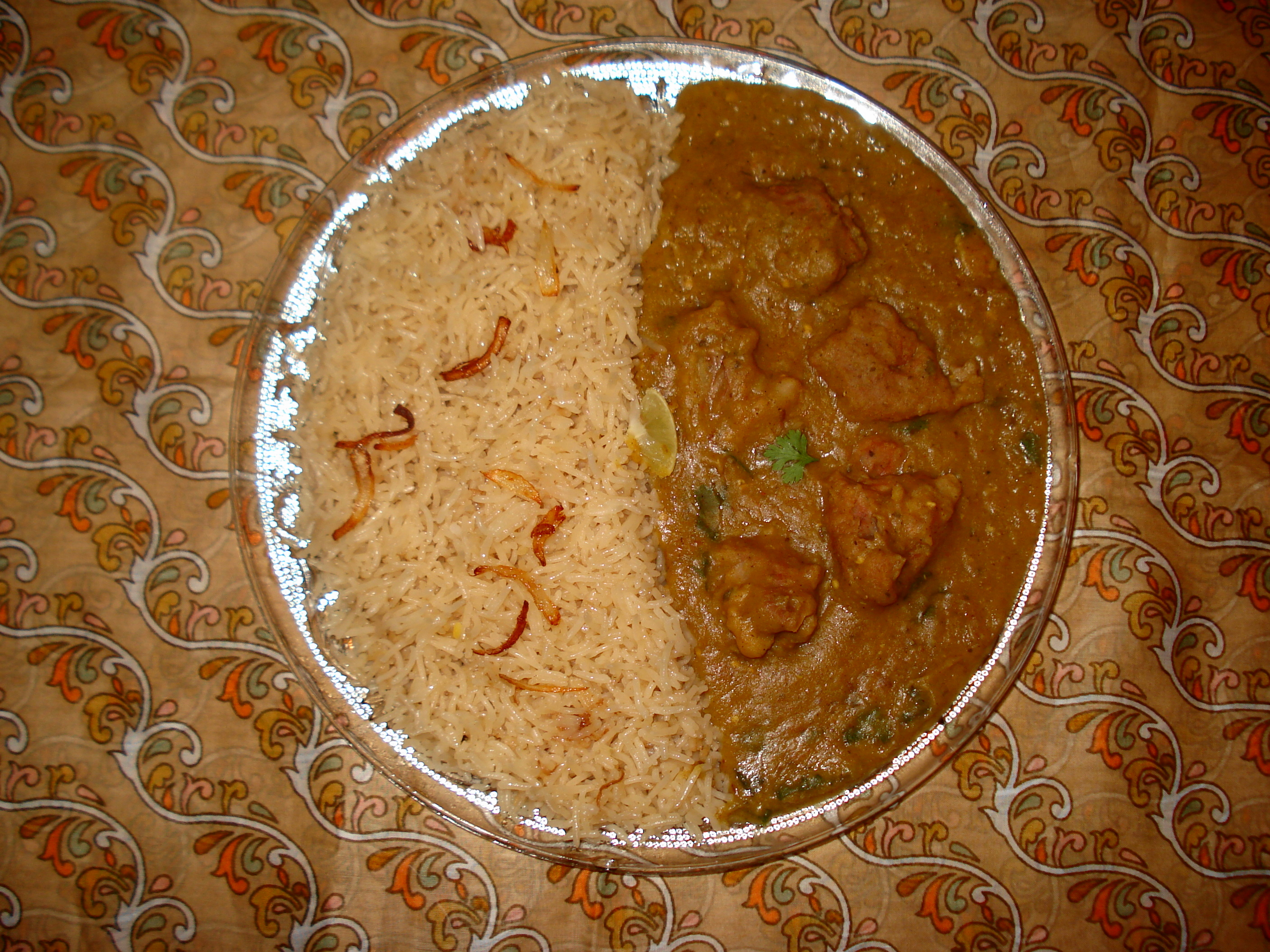
- Type: Rice and Curry
- Place of origin: India
- Region or state: Gujarat
- Associated cuisine: Parsi, Indian
- Main ingredients: Lentils, vegetables, spices, cumin seeds, ginger, garlic, mutton, either gourd or pumpkin

Dhansak (Gujarati: ધાનશાક, dhānśāk) is a popular Indian dish, originating among the Parsi community of Gujarat. It is made by cooking chicken or mutton with a mixture of lentils and vegetables. This is served with caramelised rice and fried onions. The dish was adopted during the British Raj into Anglo-Indian cuisine. A version of the dish has become a standard type of curry in the United Kingdom.

== Origins ==
Migrants from Persia settled in Bombay, developing their own Parsi cuisine. Dhansak was adopted into Anglo-Indian cuisine in the 19th century. It was adapted again to local taste in Indian restaurants in Britain.

=== Gujarat's Parsis ===
Dhansak originated among Gujarat's Parsi community, Zoroastrians who had moved from Persia after the Arab invasion in medieval times.

Dhānśāk is the Gujarati name for a dish of either meat or vegetables in a sweet and sour lentil sauce. The name derives from the Sanskrit dhānya, 'grain', and śāka, 'vegetables' (cf. saag, green vegetables, spinach).

Parsi cuisine often, as here, extends a more expensive ingredient (meat) by combining it with vegetables or lentils. In Parsi homes, dhansak is traditionally made on Sundays, as it is time-consuming to make.

=== Anglo-Indian to British ===
During the British Raj in India, merchants of the East India Company met Bombay's Parsis. When the British rebuilt Bombay after an epidemic of the plague in 1896, many Parsi cafes were opened. These sold Parsi dishes, including dhansak, alongside English biscuits and cakes. British merchants employed many Parsis as butlers, and dhansak became a popular Anglo-Indian dish. Returnees eventually brought the recipe home to Britain, where it became a familiar curry in the country's many Indian restaurants. The name "dhansak" was redefined to mean "a slightly sweet lentil curry".

== Dish ==
Dhansak is made by cooking cubes of chicken or mutton with a mixture of lentils and vegetables. Traditionally, four types of pulses were used together. The vegetables used can include aubergines, bell peppers, potatoes, squashes, and spinach. The curry is cooked until the pulses break up and make the sauce thick. It is heavily spiced with mild spices such as cardamom, cinnamon, coriander, and nutmeg. Stronger flavourings such as garlic, ginger, fenugreek, mustard seed, and chili can be added. The sauce is flavoured with tamarind or lime juice to make it sour, and jaggery sugar to make it sweet, creating a Gujarati-style sweet and sour sauce. The dish is traditionally served with caramelised rice and fried onions.

International recipe variants for dhansak sometimes call for pineapple chunks to provide a sweet flavour. Vegetarian versions can use spinach and butternut squash in place of meat.

== See also ==
- List of lamb dishes
- List of goat dishes
- Parsi cuisine
- Indian cuisine

== Sources ==
- Collingham, Lizzie (2007). Curry: A Tale of Cooks and Conquerors. Oxford University Press.
