= Bandrake Head =

Village in Cumbria, England

Coordinates: 54.275°N 3.066°W

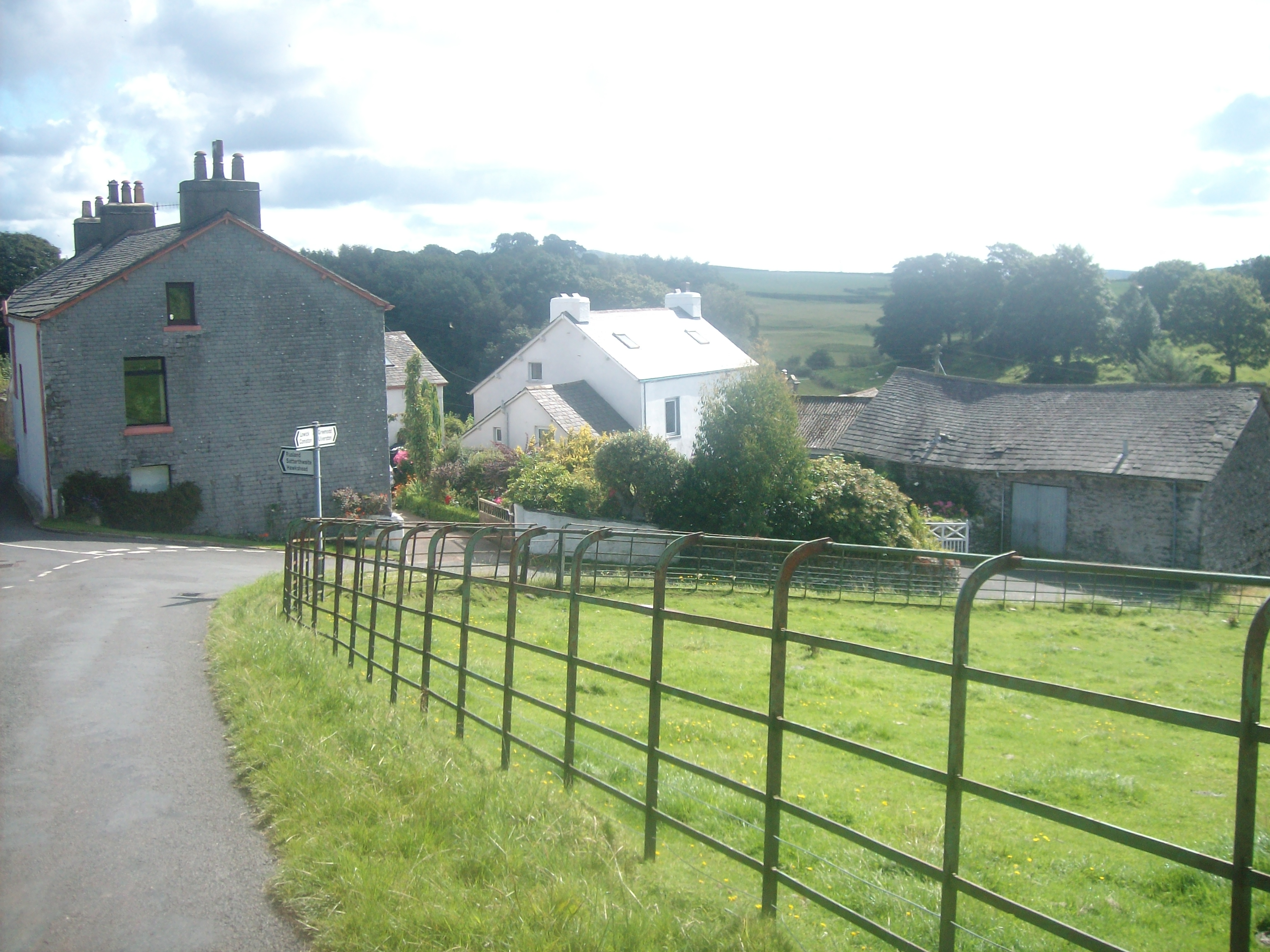
- The road into Bandrake Head

- Location in South Lakeland Location within Cumbria
- OS grid reference: SD309865
- Civil parish: Colton
- Unitary authority: Westmorland and Furness
- Ceremonial county: Cumbria
- Region: North West
- Country: England
- Sovereign state: United Kingdom
- Post town: ULVERSTON
- Postcode district: LA12
- Dialling code: 01229
- Police: Cumbria
- Fire: Cumbria
- Ambulance: North West
- UK Parliament: Westmorland and Lonsdale

Bandrake Head is a village in Cumbria, England.
