= Bankshead =

Hamlet in Shropshire, England

Coordinates: 52.502°N 3.021°W

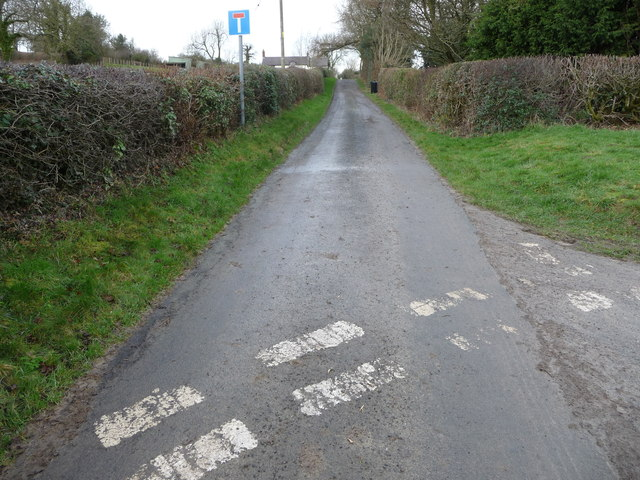
- A lane in Bankshead

- Location within Shropshire
- OS grid reference: SO307898
- Civil parish: Bishop's Castle
- Unitary authority: Shropshire
- Ceremonial county: Shropshire
- Region: West Midlands
- Country: England
- Sovereign state: United Kingdom
- Post town: BISHOPS CASTLE
- Postcode district: SY9
- Dialling code: 01588
- Police: West Mercia
- Fire: Shropshire
- Ambulance: West Midlands
- UK Parliament: Ludlow

Bankshead is a hamlet in Shropshire, England, near Bishop's Castle and the England-Wales border.
