= Bank Houses =

Hamlet in Lancashire, England

Coordinates: 53.970°N 2.869°W

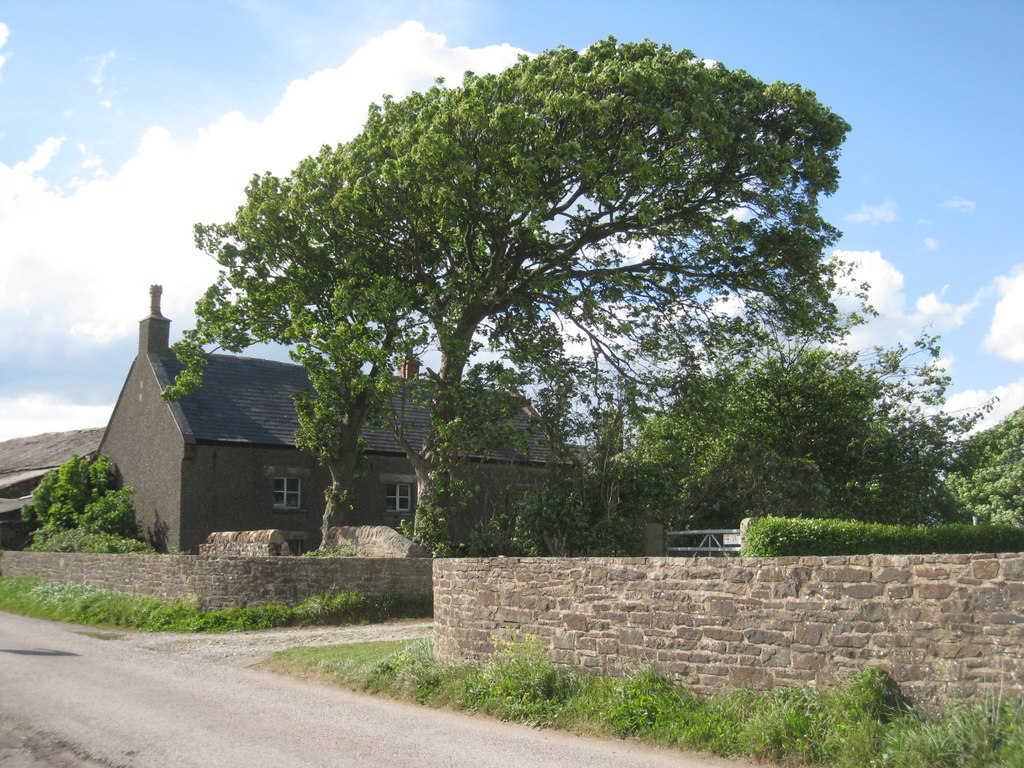
- Farm at Bank Houses

- Location in the City of Lancaster district Location within Lancashire
- OS grid reference: SD430530
- Civil parish: Thurnham; Cockerham
- District: City of Lancaster
- Shire county: Lancashire
- Region: North West
- Country: England
- Sovereign state: United Kingdom
- Post town: LANCASTER
- Postcode district: LA2
- Dialling code: 01524
- Police: Lancashire
- Fire: Lancashire
- Ambulance: North West
- UK Parliament: Lancaster and Wyre

Bank Houses is a hamlet in Lancashire, England.
