= Bank Top, Tyne and Wear =

Coordinates: 54.996°N 1.767°W

Bank Top
- Hexham Road

- Location within Tyne and Wear
- OS grid reference: NZ1466
- Metropolitan county: Tyne and Wear
- Region: North East
- Country: England
- Sovereign state: United Kingdom
- Police: Northumbria
- Fire: Tyne and Wear
- Ambulance: North East

Bank Top is a neighbourhood on the west side of Throckley, in Tyne and Wear, England.
