= Iranis (India) =

Zoroastrian community in India

Persian: ایرانی

Total population
- 139,362 (2011)

Languages
- Zoroastrian Dari, Hindi, Other Persian Dialects

Religion
- Zoroastrianism, Islam

Related ethnic groups
- Parsis

The Iranis, singular form Irani (Persian: ایرانی, romanized: ee-raw-née, lit. 'Iranian', see Wiktionary: ایرانی) are an ethno-religious community on the Indian subcontinent; they descend from the Zoroastrians who emigrated from Qajar-era Iran to British India in the 19th and 20th centuries. They are culturally, linguistically, ethnically and socially distinct from the Parsis, who — although also Zoroastrians — immigrated to the Indian subcontinent from Greater Iran many centuries prior, starting with the Islamic conquest of Persia.

== Demographics ==
Historical population of Irani Indians in India
Year	Pop.	±% p.a.
1951	80,127	—
1961	90,157	+1.19%
1971	99,583	+1.00%
1981	109,462	+0.95%
1991	119,631	+0.89%
2001	129,145	+0.77%
2011	139,362	+0.76%

== Distinction from Parsis ==
The Parsis and Iranis are considered legally distinct. A 1909 obiter dictum relating to the Indian Zoroastrians observed that Iranis (of the now defunct Bombay Presidency) were not obliged to uphold the decisions of the then regulatory Parsi Panchayat. Some of the Irani community speaks an ethnolect called Zoroastrian Dari whereas most Parsis typically speak Gujarati. However, the two communities increasingly intermarry and are said to have been "integrated well" with each other.

== History ==
Although the term 'Irani' is first attested during the Mughal era, most Iranis are descended from immigrants who left Iran and migrated to the Indian subcontinent during the late 19th and early 20th centuries. At the time, Iran was ruled by the Qajars and religious persecution of Zoroastrians was widespread. Some Iranis still speak Persian and the Dari dialects of the Zoroastrians of those provinces. Iranis are generally seen as a subset of the wider Zoroastrian community.

As is also the case for the Parsis, the Iranis predominantly settled on the west coast of the Indian subcontinent.

== See also ==
- Irani café
- Persecution of Buddhists by Zoroastrians
