= Osmania biscuit =

Indian tea biscuit

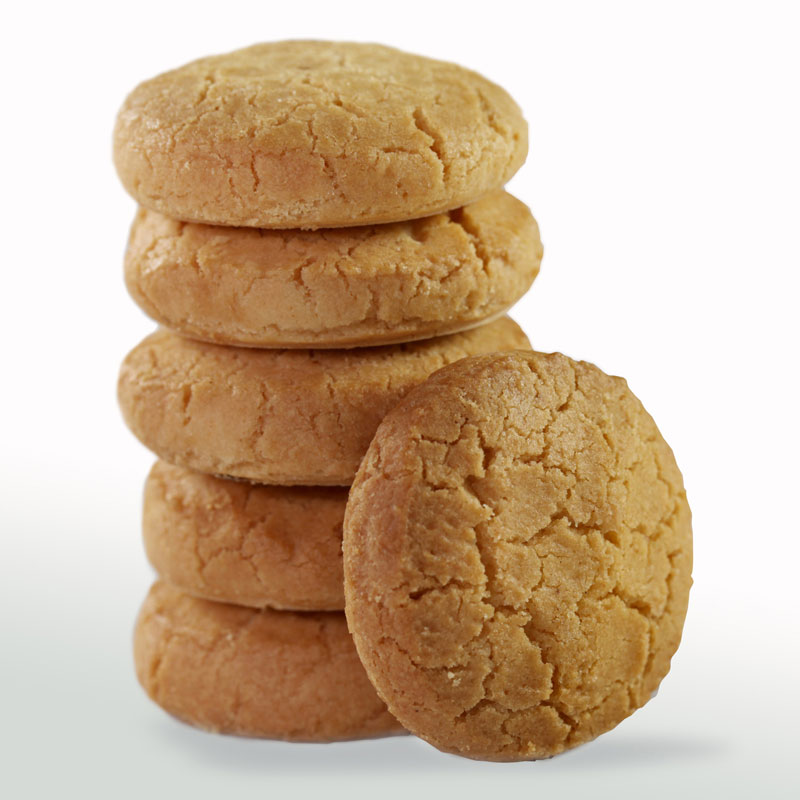
- Type: Tea biscuit
- Course: Snack
- Place of origin: India
- Region or state: Hyderabad
- Associated cuisine: Indian
- Main ingredients: Milk, flour, cardamom, salt, sugar

Osmania biscuit is a popular tea biscuit in Hyderabadi cuisine.

== History ==
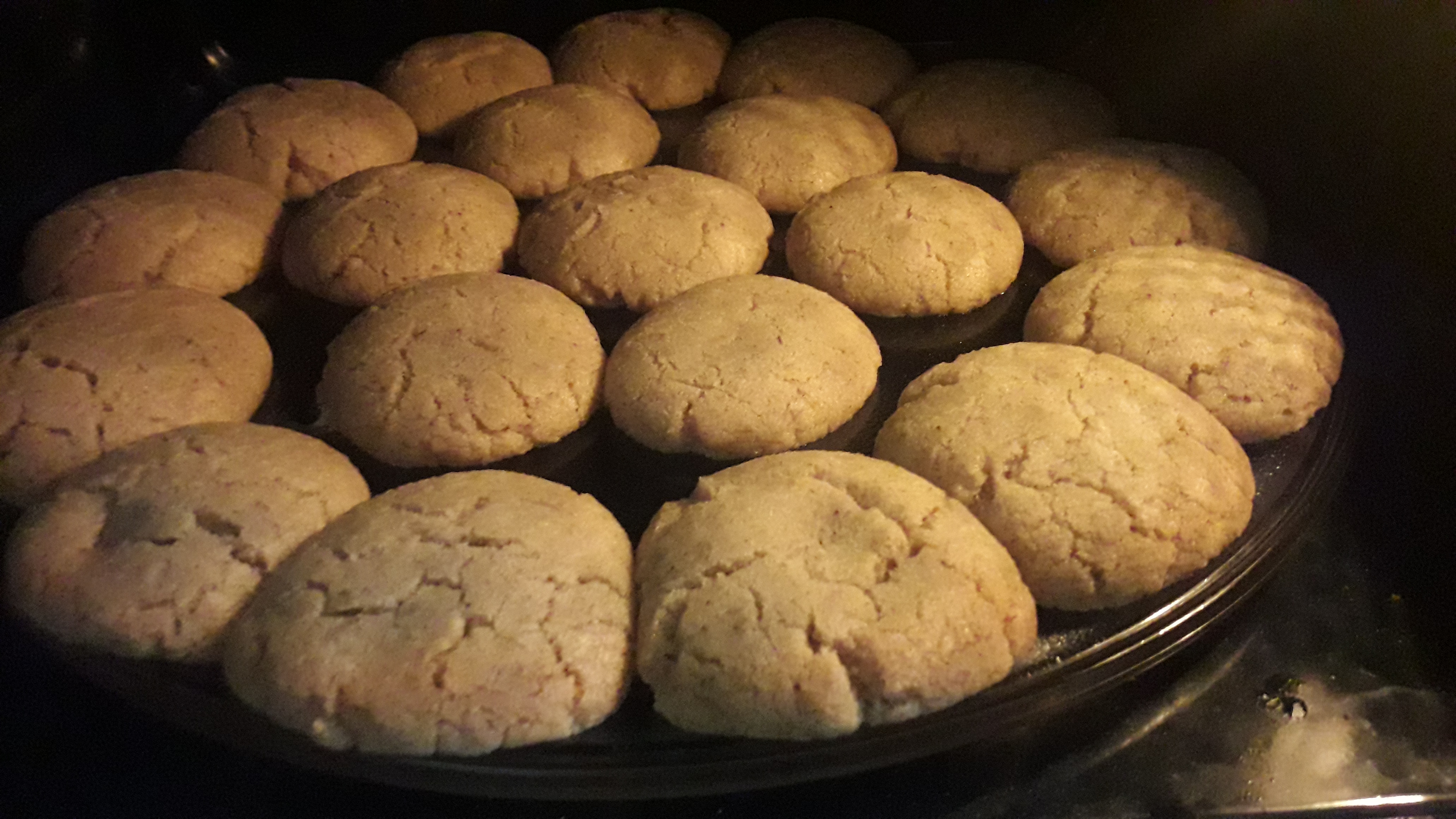
Homemade osmania biscuits

Osmania Biscuits trace their origins to the royal kitchens of the last Nizam of Hyderabad, Mir Osman Ali Khan, who sought a snack with a perfect blend of sweetness and saltiness. Historical documents substantiate that Osmania Biscuits were initially introduced during the Nizam's reign, highlighting their aristocratic beginnings.

The development of Osmania Biscuits was significantly influenced by Turkish and Persian baking customs, contributing to their distinctive flavor profile and texture. This historical connection adds depth to their culinary heritage, reflecting a synthesis of cultures in the creation of this iconic treat.

These biscuits have become synonymous with the cultural identity of Hyderabad, particularly in areas like Charminar and Old Hyderabad. Osmania Biscuits have become an integral part of the local culinary scene, often paired with the renowned Irani chai.

Beyond the boundaries of Hyderabad, variations of Osmania Biscuits can be found in Tamil Nadu, with the name 'butter biscuit' of Chennai bearing a striking resemblance. In Ooty, "ooty biscuits" are made in a similar way. But both have no cultural touch with each other as each of the types originated around similar historical period. This widespread popularity underscores the enduring appeal of Osmania Biscuits, not just within the city but also as a cultural delicacy recognized throughout India and beyond.

== See also ==
- Flour kurabiye
