= Irani café =

Iranian style of café in South Asia

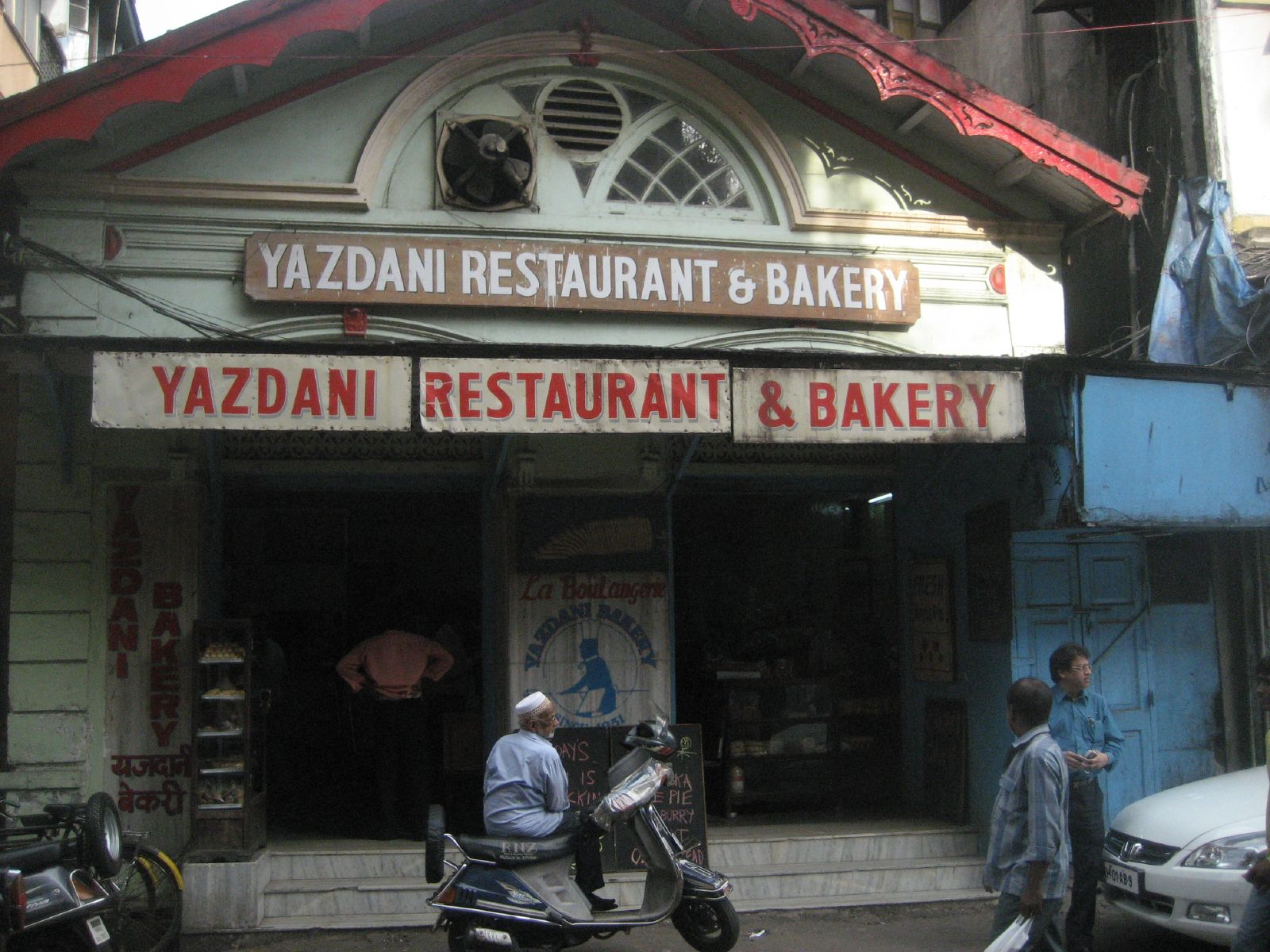
Yazdani Bakery in Mumbai, India

Irani cafés are Iranian-style cafés in the Indian subcontinent. They were originally opened by Zoroastrian Irani immigrants to British India in the 19th century, fleeing Qajar persecution or looking for better economic prospects. In India, Mumbai, Pune and Hyderabad have a number of Irani cafés, which are popular for Irani chai (tea). In the 1950s, there were 350 Irani cafés in Mumbai; only 25 remained in the city as of 2005. Meanwhile, in Hyderabad, it is estimated that the number of Irani cafés has shrunk from 450 in the 2000s to 125 in 2024. Karachi, Pakistan, was also home to many Irani cafés.

== History ==
They were originally opened by Zoroastrian Irani immigrants to British India in the 19th century after they fled from Safavid persecution in West and Central Asia.

Writing for the Hindu Business Line, on "Mumbai's Irani hotspots", Sarika Mehta stated, "The classic format of these cafes is basic with a subtle colonial touch; high ceilings with black, bent wooden chairs (now cane in some cafes), wooden tables with marble tops and glass jars that allow a peek into the goodies they hold. With huge glass mirrors on the walls to create a feeling of space, visitors are greeted with eagerness and a whiff of baking. The speed of operations is impressive and service quite hassle-free."

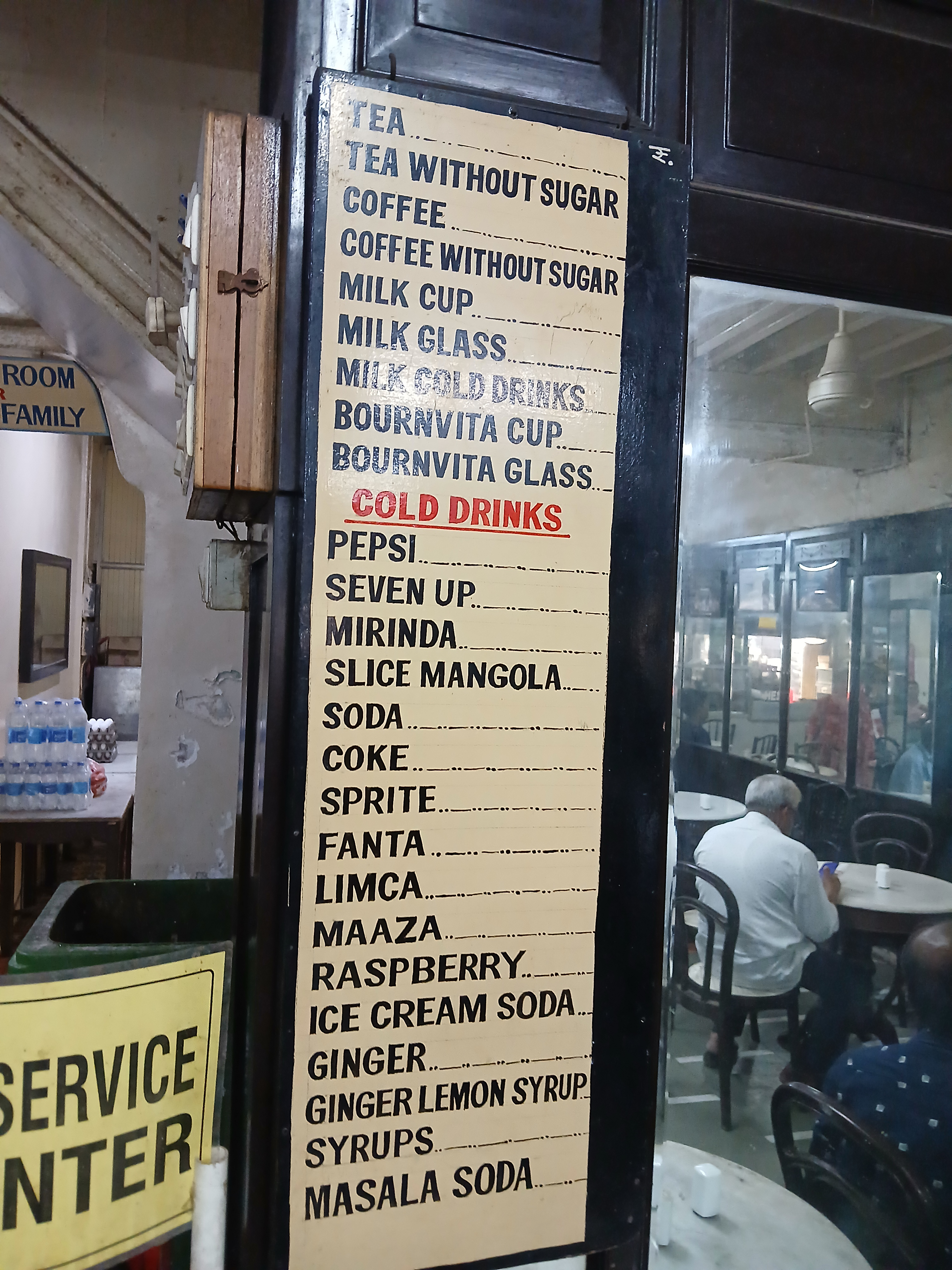
Menu at Merwan Cafe

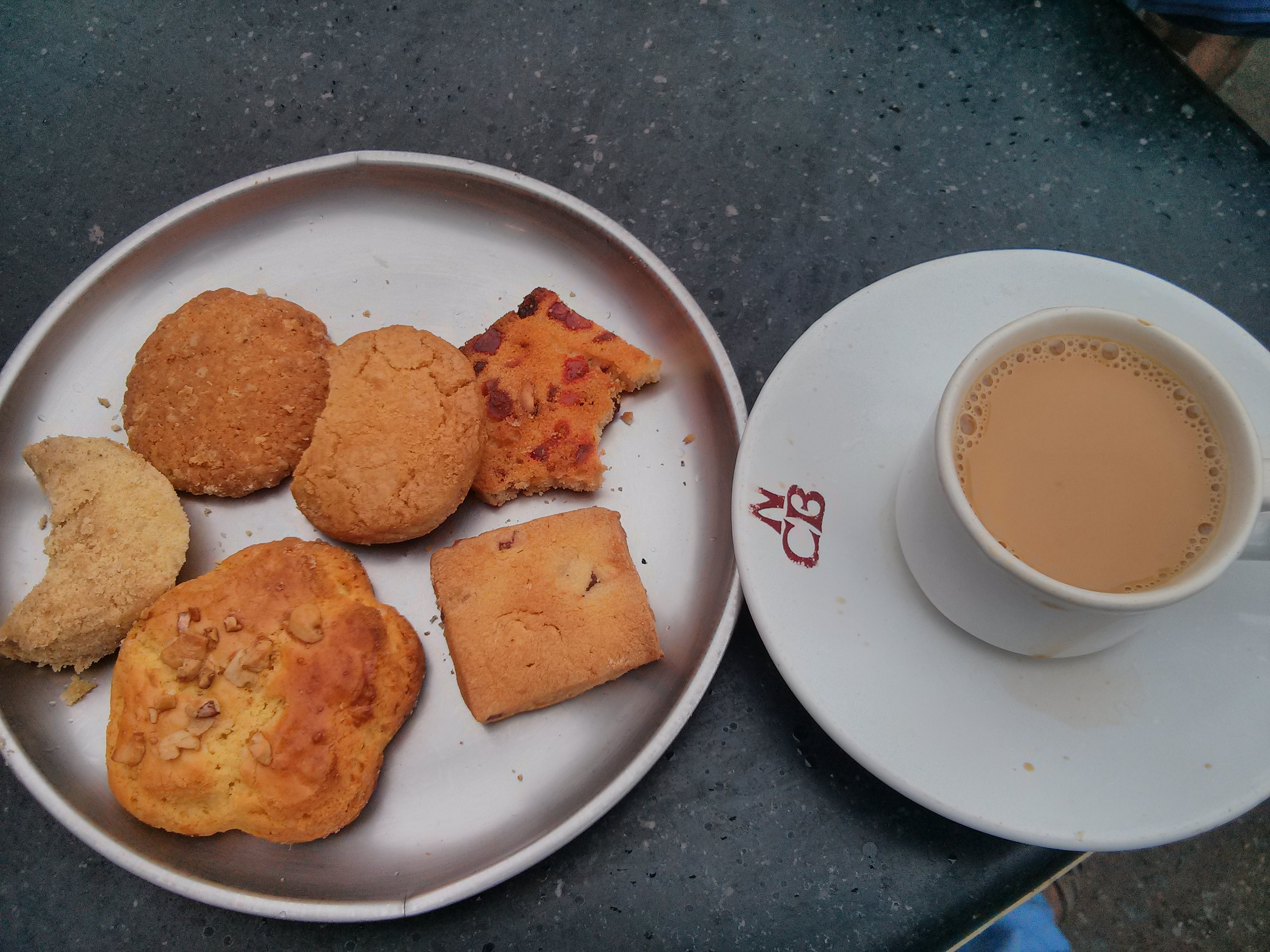
Irani chai and Osmania biscuits served in Hyderabad

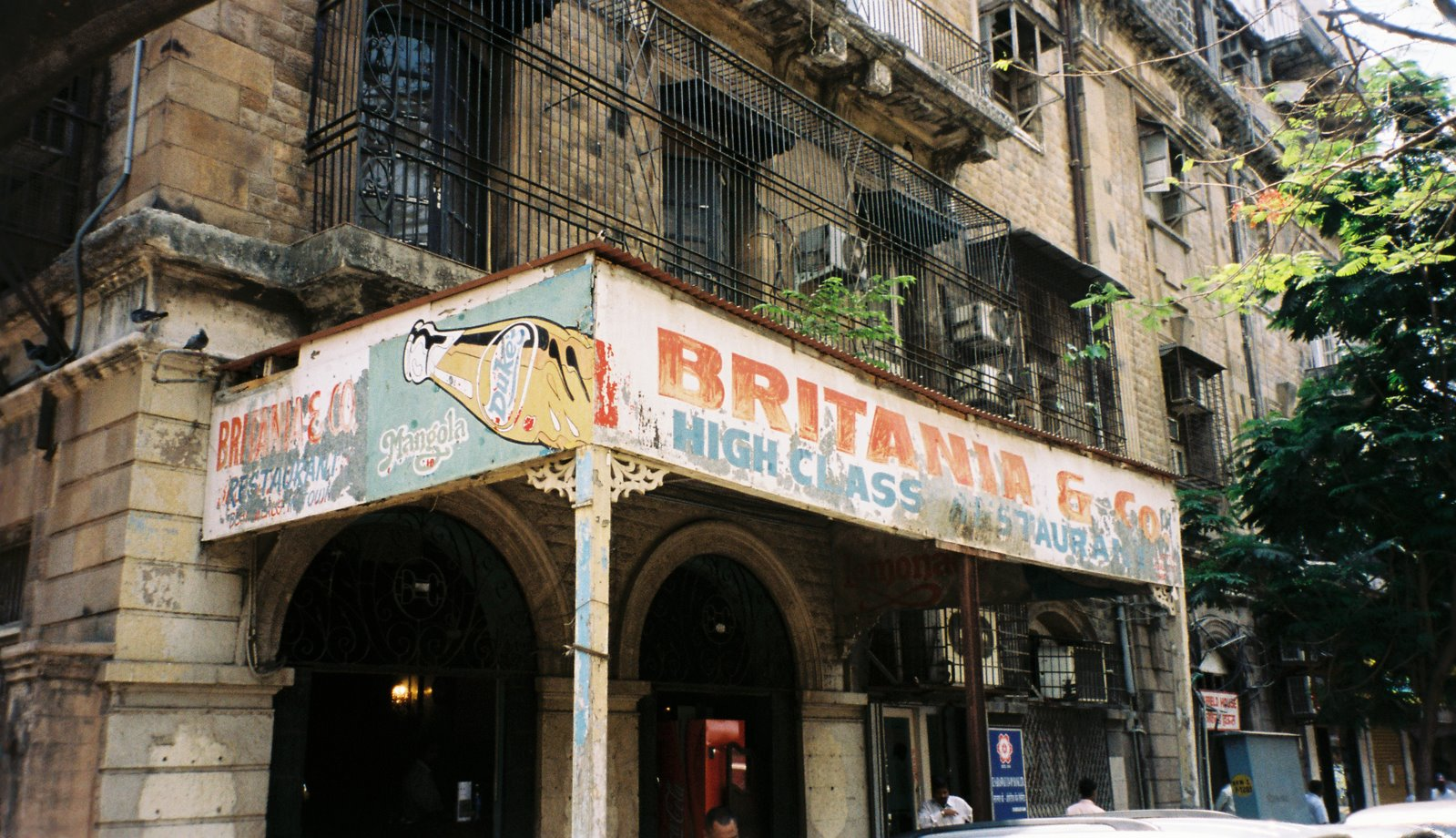
Britannia Café, an Irani café at Ballard Estate, South Mumbai

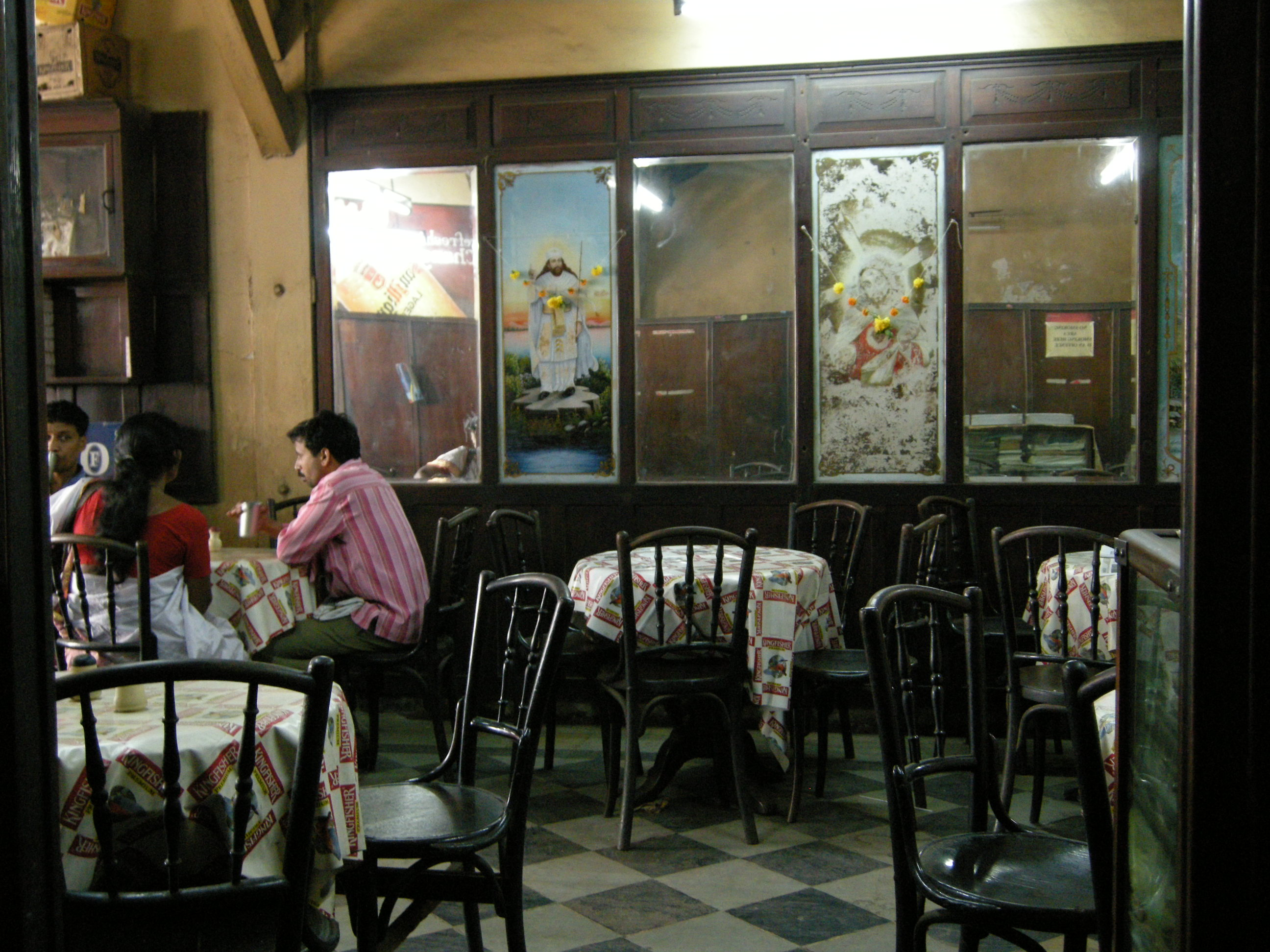
Interior of Kayani and Company, an Irani café

== Fare ==
Irani cafés may serve bun maska (bread and butter) or brun-maska (hard buttered croissants), and paani kam chai (a strong Iranian tea, lit. 'tea with less water'), or khari chai (very strong tea), mutton samosas, and kheema pav (minced meat served in bread rolls), akuri (scrambled eggs and vegetables), berry pulao, vegetable puff, vegetarian/chicken dhansak (a spiced lentil dish with meat and vegetables) and biryani, cherry cream custard, cheese khari biscuits, plain khari biscuits, coconut jam and milk biscuits and Duke's raspberry drink.

Many Irani cafés offer sweet and salted biscuits like rawa (semolina), til-rawa coconut, nankhatai (sweet, crisp flaky Irani biscuits), Madeira cake (tutti-frutti biscuits).

== Cultural references ==
Nissim Ezekiel wrote a poem based on instruction boards found in his favourite Irani café: the defunct Bastani and Company in Dhobi Talao, Mumbai.
