= Bank Street, Worcestershire =

Coordinates: 52.260107°N 2.534688°W

Bank Street
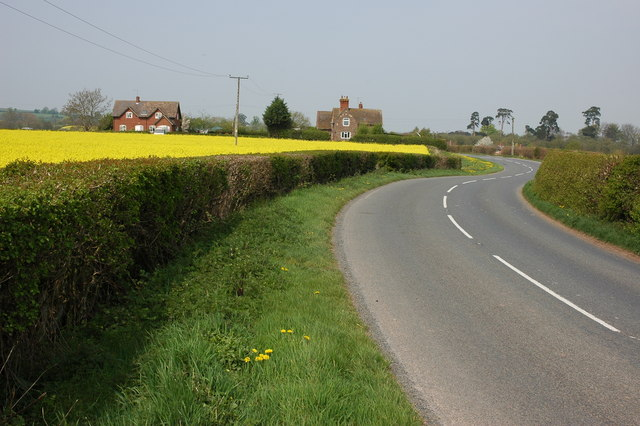
- The B4212 through the village

- Location within Worcestershire
- OS grid reference: SO636625
  - London: 116 miles (187 km)
- Civil parish: Kyre
- District: Malvern Hills
- Shire county: Worcestershire
- Region: West Midlands
- Country: England
- Sovereign state: United Kingdom
- Post town: TENBURY WELLS
- Postcode district: WR15
- Dialling code: 01886
- Police: West Mercia
- Fire: Hereford and Worcester
- Ambulance: West Midlands

Bank Street is a village in Malvern Hills District, Worcestershire, England.
