= Imtiaz Qureshi =

Indian chef (1931–2024)

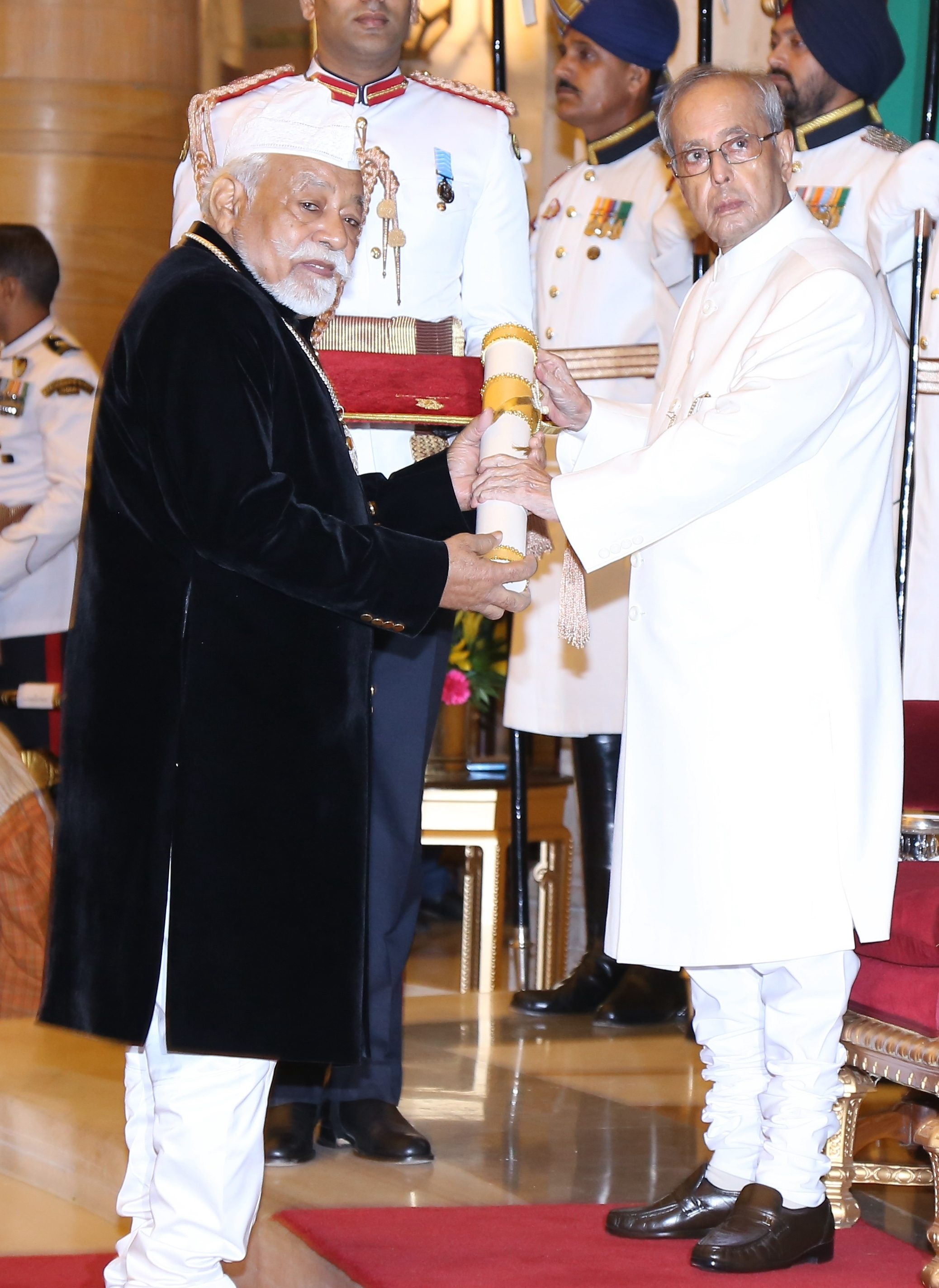
- Qureshi receiving Padma Shri from President Pranab Mukherjee in 2016
- Born: 2 February 1931; Lucknow, British India
- Died: 16 February 2024 (aged 93); Mumbai, Maharashtra, India
- Known for: Reviving the Dum Pukht cooking tradition (a method of slow cooking)
- Children: 7
- Culinary career
- Cooking style: Awadhi cuisine; Mughlai cuisine
- Award won: Padma Shri (2016)

Imtiaz Qureshi (Note: Qureshi's first name is alternately spelt as Imitiaz. Specifically, the Padma Shri citation from 2016 has his name spelt as Imitiaz Qureshi.) (2 February 1931 – 16 February 2024) was an Indian chef known for reviving the Dum Pukht cooking tradition and creating restaurant brands including Bukhara and Dum Pukht. He was a master chef at ITC Hotels, an Indian luxury hotel chain. Qureshi is credited with the popularisation of Awadhi cuisine with some of his popular dishes including Dal Bukhara, Dum Pukht Biryani, Kakori Kebab, Warqi Paratha, and Garlic Kheer.

2016 Qureshi received the Padma Shri, India's fourth-highest civilian honour, for his culinary contributions. He was the first chef to win this award in this category. (Note: Chef Tarla Dalal had won this award earlier in 2007 in the 'others' category)

== Early life ==
Qureshi was born on 2 February 1931 in a family of chefs in Lucknow, United Provinces of Agra and Oudh (in present-day Indian state of Uttar Pradesh) of the then British India. The family traced its lineage to over 200 years when they were the chefs for the rulers of Awadh.

== Career ==
Qureshi started his culinary journey with his uncle at the age of nine, when his uncle was tasked with cooking for a British regiment with over 10,000 soldiers in India. He later joined Krishna Caterers, a catering company which served the Indian Army during the Sino-Indian War of 1962. During this time, he cooked for the then Indian prime minister Jawaharlal Nehru for a state banquet hosted by Chandra Bhanu Gupta, the then chief minister of Uttar Pradesh. The dinner was supposed to be a vegetarian meal, when Nehru was surprised to see murgh musallam, fish, and shami kebabs, on his table, only to be told that Qureshi had reinterpreted vegetarian dishes including jackfruit, lotus stem, brinjal, and bottle gourd to appear as meat dishes. Qureshi was later commissioned by Nehru to cook for the opening of the Ashok Hotel in Delhi. A dish that is attributed to him during this time was Dal Bukhara (lentils cooked in the Bukhara tradition). The dish was based on black lentils (Urad dal) cooked similar to the one-pot meal called Khichdi. In another event from the time, at Krishna hotel, the young Qureshi was noted to have cooked a banquet for Begum Akhtar, when she had reached out in distress after Qureshi's mentor, the senior chef, was missing while having to cook for a Majlis.

After working at a few local restaurants in Lucknow, including at the Clark's Hotel, he was recruited by ITC Hotels' founder Ajit Haksar in 1979. He popularized cooking in copper vessels at these restaurants. With an objective of reviving Awadhi cuisine, Haksar had asked Qureshi to prepare a menu inspired by the food at Walima, the banquet that is a part of Islamic weddings. Qureshi also served the hospitality chain at several of their locations including at the Maurya Sheraton, Delhi before becoming the master chef of the group. At the ITC Hotels, he was credited for reviving the Awadhi Dum Pukht cooking tradition (a method of slow cooking) and creating restaurant brands including Bukhara and Dum Pukht. The first of these brands, Bukhara, was opened in 1977, and Dum Pukht in 1989. Dum Pukht, translating to "choking off the steam", was a method of slow-cooking where the food was cooked sealed and kept warm in double-walled clay ovens called Bukharis. Spices and herbs were subsequently added to the dish. In the modern way of cooking, meat and vegetables are partially cooked and placed in a cauldron and sealed with a ring of atta (transl. flour). The food then cooks in its own juices and steam with the moisture remaining within, retaining the flavour of the ingredients. Simultaneously burning coal is placed on the lid, allowing the food to be heated from the bottom and the top at the same time. One of the most popular dum pukht dishes is the Dum Pukht Biryani.

In a 2016 interview with the Indian newspaper Mid-Day, he noted that "[he] created the menu for Bukhara in one night, while running 104 degree Fahrenheit fever. Till date, the menu remains unchanged." Describing his method of cooking, Qureshi maintained that he did not believe in measures, but instead relied on Andaz (transl. instinct) and measured ingredients by his palm. In another interview in 2015 with the Indian newspaper, The Financial Express, he weighed in on the Biryani versus Pulao debate stating "There is no such thing as biryani. Every dish is a pulao. In every so-called biryani, rice is three-fourth cooked when added to either raw or cooked meat. So technically, all of them are pulaos."

Some of his other popular dishes included the Kakori Kebab, which was noted for a glossier exterior and finer texture compared to the Seekh kebab. The dish was not well known outside of specific Lucknow households until he popularized them during his time at the ITC hotels. During this time, he also collaborated with Jiggs Kalra on various columns and articles aiming to popularize Awadhi cuisine. The partnership established Qureshi as the face of ITC Hotels' restaurants and culminated in a book. Some of his other signature dishes included Grand Trunk Road Tandoori Fruit Chaat, Warqi Paratha, and Garlic kheer, the last of which won him praises from the president A. P. J. Abdul Kalam and prime minister Lal Bahadur Shastri.

Qureshi served several official banquets hosted by various Prime Ministers and Presidents of India, including Jawaharlal Nehru, Indira Gandhi, Zakir Husain, and Atal Bihari Vajpayee for visiting leaders including Queen Elizabeth II, Bill Clinton, Hillary Clinton and Tony Blair among others. The Government of India awarded him the fourth-highest civilian honour of the Padma Shri, in 2016, for his contributions to culinary art. He was the first to win this award in this category. Chef Tarla Dalal had received the Padma Shri in the 'others' category in 2007 in the capacity of Author.

Qureshi retired from his service with ITC Hotels in 2017.

== Personal life ==
Qureshi was married and had five sons and two daughters: Aisha Qureshi, Ishtiyaque Qureshi, Ashfaque Qureshi, Irfan Qureshi, Yasmin Qureshi, Imran Qureshi and Muhammad Ahsan Ali Qureshi, who are also in the culinary business and have restaurants in India and abroad, grandson Azaan Qureshi is the sixth generation chef awarded Asia's 50 best in year 2022. In his early days, Qureshi also dabbled as a local wrestler in Lucknow and was referred to as Imtiaz Pehlwan.

Qureshi died in Mumbai on 16 February 2024, aged 93. He had been admitted to the Lilavati Hospital in Mumbai, two weeks earlier.

== See also ==
- Tarla Dalal
