= Roust =

Bengali dish

- Alternative names: রোস্ট, Roust
- Type: Curry
- Course: Main
- Place of origin: Bangladesh
- Region or state: Bangladesh (Old Dhaka)
- Associated cuisine: Mughal cuisine Bengali cuisine
- Created by: Mughals
- Main ingredients: Chicken, garlic, ginger, cardamom, cinnamon powder salt, orange blossom, ghee, onion, cashew, ground coriander, mace, nutmeg, mawa, cream, rose water, sugar, star anise, white chrysanthemum, cumin chili

Roust is a Bengali dish, possibly originating in Old Dhaka, Bangladesh (Eastern Bengal, now Bangladesh). The dish is influenced by the Mughlai cuisine of the Mughal Empire. The dish is known for including a large array of spices and ingredients and being a little sweet and very rich. The dish has developed several regional variants.

Roust is made during almost all celebratory times in Bengal, especially during Eid al-Fitr, where it is an important dish always included. However, the dish is made anytime important guests are coming over. The dish is very popularly made in restaurants in Dhaka, Rajshahi and Bogra in Bangladesh as well as they do.

== Influence ==
The dish was influenced by the Mughal cuisine of the Sultans of Bengal and the Mughal Emperors. The Persian and Arabs were known for their large amount of aromatic spices but limited amount of spiciness. Rôst reflects this type of culinary style while using more than 10 different spices they are all mild and instead add much richer and aromatic flavour. Rost also still carries much of its Bengali influence through use of garlic and green chillies and much ghee.

== History ==
It is believed that Rost was first made in Old Dhaka (the then capital of Bengal Subah) made by Muslim chefs for the Nawabs and Zamindars of the city. It was made to combine the Mughlai cuisine and Bengali cuisine, using the large amount of foreign spices such as saffron and extensive amount of ghee and the traditional Bengali spices and sweetness used in Bengal. The dish was largely confined within the Old City but after the creation of East Bengal and Assam when Dhaka was made the Provincial capital, dishes of the city started to become popular as more people travelled in and out of the city. After the creation of East Bengal the dish became one of the most popular dishes in the province. In modern-day Bangladesh, Rost is the most popular dish eaten at every single special occasion.
