= Ali Ahmed Aslam =

Scottish chef (1945–2022)

- Born: 1 April 1945 near Lahore, British India
- Died: 19 December 2022 (aged 77); Glasgow, Scotland
- Occupations: Chef; restaurateur
- Known for: Inventing chicken tikka masala
- Children: 5

Ali Ahmed Aslam (Urdu: علی احمد اسلم; 1 April 1945 – 19 December 2022) was a Pakistani–Scottish chef credited with inventing the dish chicken tikka masala.

== Early and personal life ==
Aslam was born on 1 April 1945 in a small village near Lahore, Punjab, British India (now Punjab, Pakistan). In either 1958 or 1959, he moved with his family to Glasgow as a young boy. His father, Noor Mohammed, opened what is considered the first true Indian restaurant in Glasgow, the Green Gates on Bank Street, in 1959.

Aslam was married and had five children. One of his sons, Asif Ali, spoke to The Glasgow Times about his father's dedication towards charity work in Scotland and Pakistan. A proud Glaswegian, his nephew Ahmed said he was a perfectionist and highly driven.

== Chef and restaurant owner ==
Aslam opened the Shish Mahal restaurant in Glasgow's west end in 1964 and reportedly ate lunch in his restaurant every day. The establishment was considered his life's work, according to friends, locals and family.

== Invention ==
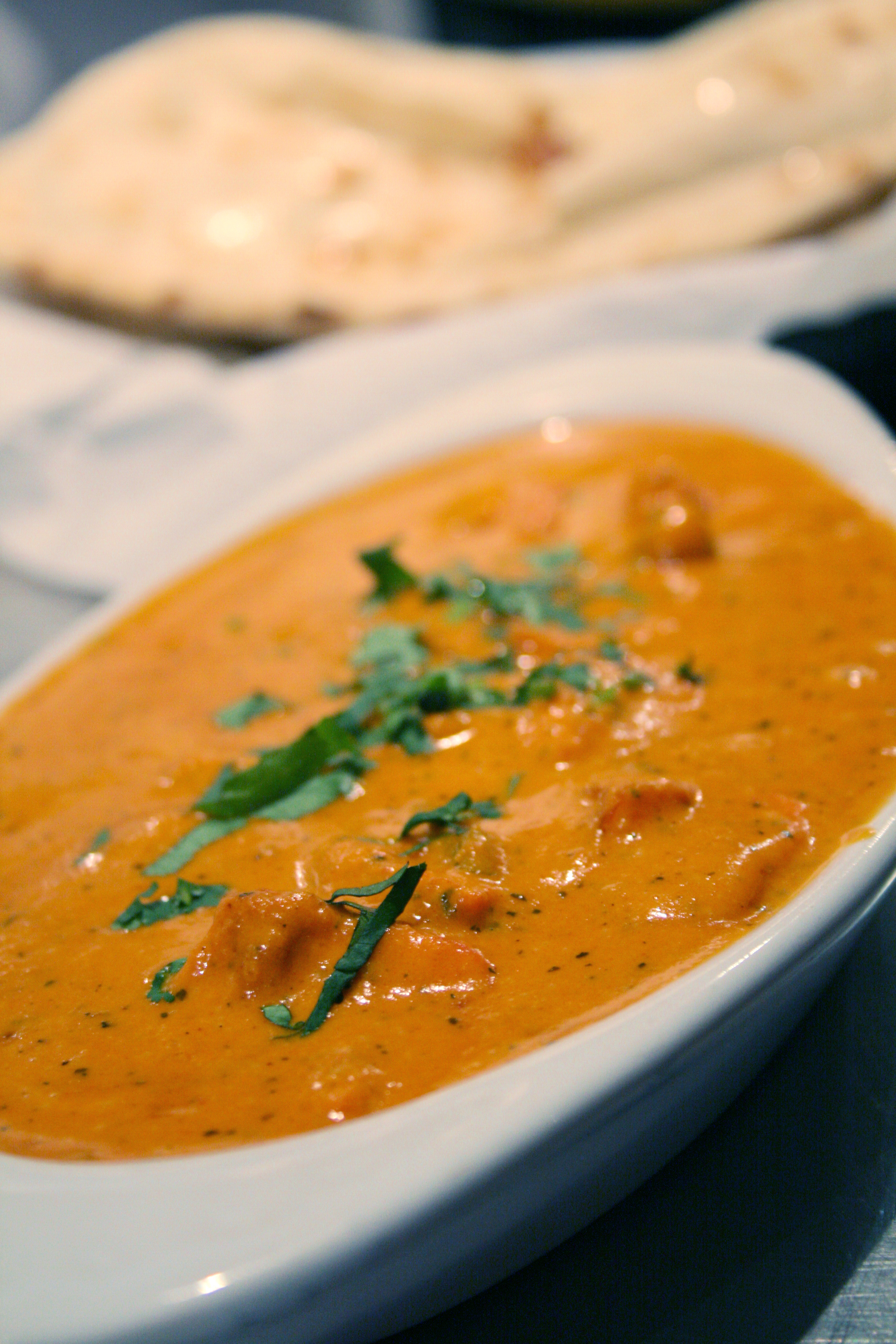
Chicken tikka masala

Though the origin of the dish is not certain, he is credited with inventing chicken tikka masala by improvising a sauce made from a tin of condensed tomato soup, and spices. He claimed he devised the recipe for "Britain's favourite curry" after a customer complained that his meal was too dry.

Quoted, he recounted the incident as follows: "Chicken tikka masala was invented in this restaurant, we used to make chicken tikka, and one day a customer said, 'I'd take some sauce with that, this is a bit dry'. We thought we'd better cook the chicken with some sauce. So from here we cooked chicken tikka with the sauce that contains yogurt, cream, spices."

The dish is widely considered an adaptation of the South Asian cuisine to suit Western European palates. Aslam claimed it was his gift to the city of Glasgow and he later campaigned unsuccessfully for the dish to be granted Protected Designation of Origin status by the European Union.

Aslam's invention of chicken tikka masala was depicted in the 2019 Good Eats episode "The Turkey Strikes Back ... Again", where Aslam was portrayed by celebrity chef Simon Majumdar.

== Death ==
Aslam died of septic shock and organ failure in Glasgow on 19 December 2022, at age 77. His funeral was held at Glasgow Central Mosque the next day, with members of the public invited to attend.
