= Chicken tikka masala =

Indo-British dish

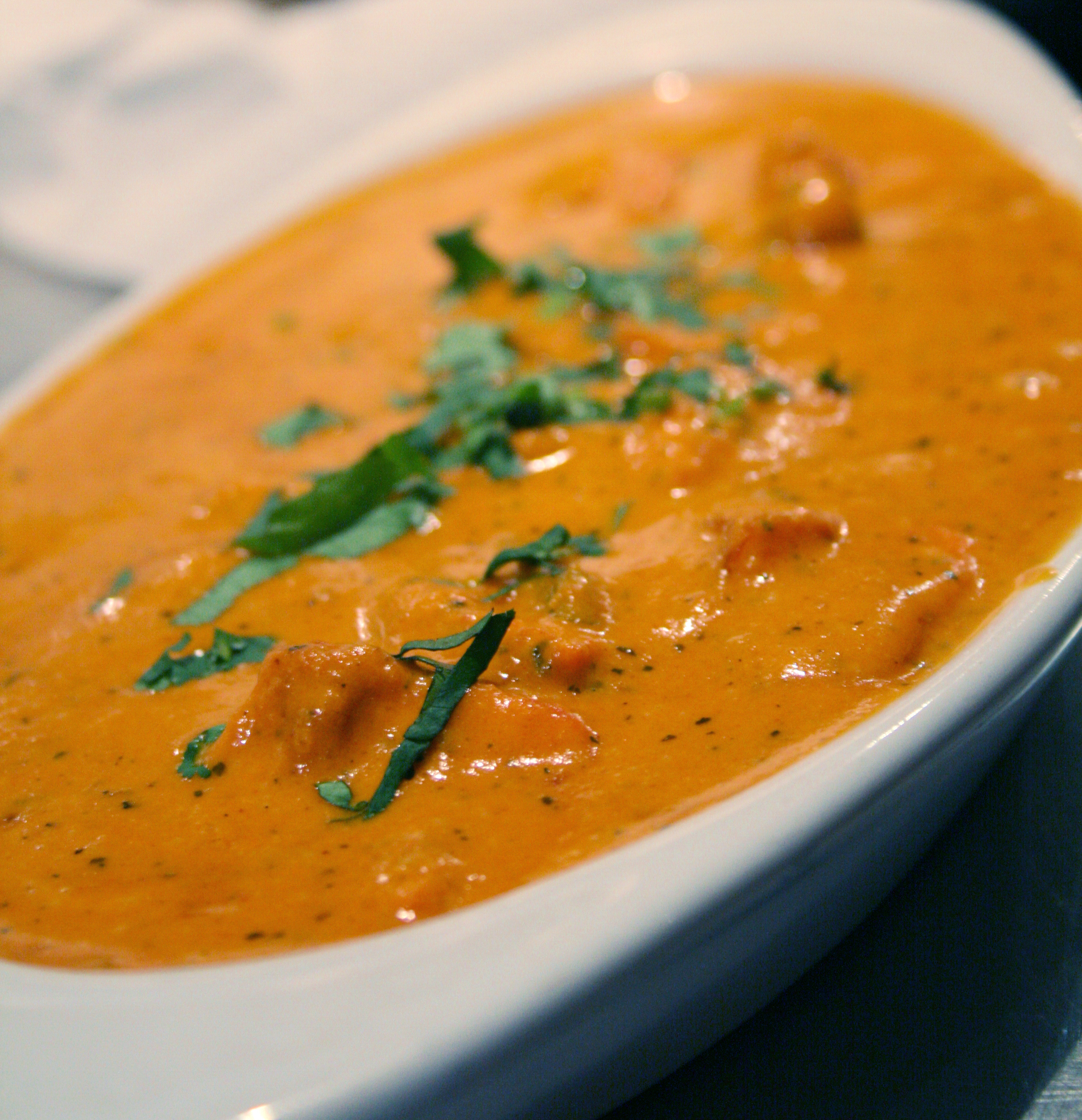
- Course: Main course
- Place of origin: United Kingdom
- Main ingredients: Chicken, yogurt, tomato, onion

Chicken tikka masala is a curry consisting of roasted marinated chicken pieces (chicken tikka) in a creamy spiced sauce (masala). It is thought to have been created in Britain, possibly by Ali Ahmed Aslam in Glasgow. It is offered at restaurants around the world and in some of its forms is similar to butter chicken.

It is one of the most popular dishes in Britain, and in 2001 was described by the British Foreign Secretary Robin Cook as "a true British national dish". The dish has been called inauthentic both by white Britons and by South Asians. Scholars and critics have debated the status of the dish, concluding variously that it has undergone an elaborate process of cultural interchange, and serves as symbol of Britain's multicultural society. Lizzie Collingham states that it feels quintessentially South Asian despite its British origins.

== Composition ==
Chicken tikka masala is a brightly coloured curry composed of chicken tikka, boneless chunks of chicken marinated in spices (masala) and yoghurt, roasted in an oven, and served in a creamy sauce. A tomato and coriander leaf sauce is common, but there is no standard recipe: a 1998 survey in Britain found that among 48 recipes, the only common ingredient was chicken. It is served as a main course, often with rice or flatbread. Some forms of chicken tikka masala are similar to butter chicken, both in the method of creation and appearance. A vegetarian alternative is to use paneer tikka, Indian cheese replacing the meat.

== Origins ==
=== Mughal ancestry ===
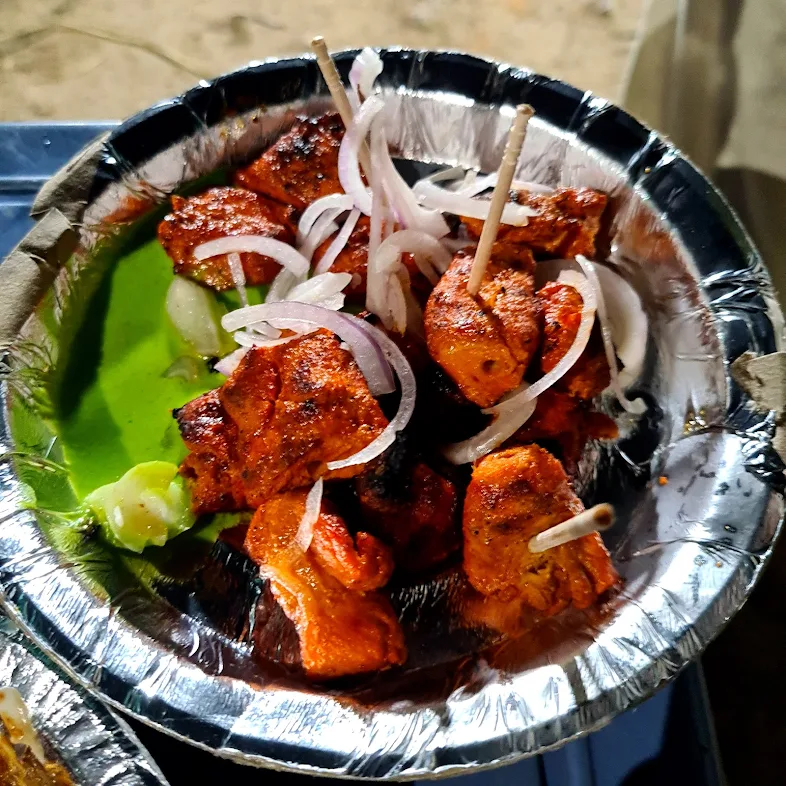
Mughal-style chicken tikka (dry, without masala sauce) as street food, Hyderabad

The English word "tikka" is borrowed from Hindi-Urdu तिक्का/تکہ tikkā "small pieces of meat", itself a borrowing from Classical Persian تکه tikka, "pieces". Chicken tikka (without a sauce) was created in the reign of the Mughal Emperor Babur (r. 1526–1530) by marinating pieces of chicken meat in yoghurt and spices, and then grilling them in a tandoor oven.

=== Created in Glasgow ===
It has been suggested that chicken tikka masala originated in a restaurant in Glasgow, Scotland. This version recounts how a British Pakistani chef, Ali Ahmed Aslam, proprietor of the Shish Mahal restaurant in Glasgow from the 1960s, invented the dish by improvising a sauce made from a tin of condensed tomato soup, and spices, to please a customer who wanted a sauce to accompany the dry chicken tikka meat. (Note: Other sources that repeat the claim include the BBC, The Guardian, The New York Times, and CNN.)

The historian of ethnic food Peter Grove challenges the claim that Aslam had created the dish, on the grounds that the dish existed several years before his restaurant opened. Specifically, Sultan Ahmed Ansari, owner of Glasgow's Taj Mahal restaurant, stated that he had created the dish in the 1950s.

The London restaurant owner Iqbal Wahhab claims that he and Peter Grove fabricated the story of a chef using Campbell's tomato soup to create chicken tikka masala "to entertain journalists", and that in particular the use of the soup was "completely made up".

=== Invented in Britain ===
Many sources attribute the creation of chicken tikka masala to the South Asian community in Great Britain. The British Indian businessman Gulam Noon is among the people who helped to popularise the dish, though he was not its inventor; he ran food product companies in Southall, in the west of London.

The Multicultural Handbook of Food, Nutrition and Dietetics credits its creation to Bangladeshi migrant chefs in Britain in the 1960s, who at that time ran most of Britain's Indian restaurants. They developed several new British Indian dishes.

Peter and Colleen Grove conclude that the dish "was most certainly invented in Britain, probably by a Bangladeshi chef." They suggest that "the shape of things to come may have been a recipe for Shahi Chicken Masala in Mrs Balbir Singh's Indian Cookery published in 1961." Mrs Balbir Singh's recipe calls for onions fried in oil, with garlic, ginger, masala spices and tomatoes for the frying mixture for the chicken; cream, ground almonds, and yoghurt are added later in the cooking.

=== Adapted from an Indian dish ===
It has been suggested that the dish is derived from butter chicken, a popular dish in the northern Indian subcontinent. Rahul Verma, a food critic for The Hindu, claimed that the dish has its origins in the Punjab region.

== Impact ==
=== Popularity ===
Chicken tikka masala is served in restaurants around the world. By 2010, it was the most popular dish in British curry houses. According to a 2012 survey of 2,000 people in Britain, it was the country's second-most popular foreign dish to cook, after Chinese stir fry. The Oxford Companion to Food traces this popularity to 1983, when supermarkets began selling the dish as a chilled meal; and as of 2016 it was the third most popular ready meal sold in UK supermarkets. In 2025, the scholars of Indian food Bhaskar Sailesh and K. Karthikeyan called it "the world's best-recognized dish". In 2009, efforts by Scottish parliamentarian Mohammed Sarwar to gain the Glasgow dish protected designation of origin status were however unsuccessful.

In the United States, chicken tikka masala has in addition been sold as a taco filling by food trucks and as a pizza topping. In India, chicken tikka masala has been seen as a novelty dish in its own right, and alongside that it has been used as a pizza topping by an Indian fast food chain. BBC Good Food has proposed chicken tikka masala pizzas, using naan flatbreads topped with the curry mix, yoghurt, and mango chutney.

=== Symbol of a multicultural society ===
Evolution of chicken tikka masala as a multicultural British dish. Chicken tikka was created in Mughal India using Persian marinading of meat in yoghurt and Central Asian tandoor roasting with Indian spices. In 20th century Britain, a sauce was added to meet the British liking for gravy with meat. The dish has evolved further to a taco filling in the US, and to a pizza topping in India. Tacos originated from Mexico. Pizzas originated from Italy.

In 2001, the British Foreign Secretary Robin Cook mentioned the dish in a speech acclaiming the benefits of Britain's multiculturalism, declaring:

Chicken tikka masala is now a true British national dish, not only because it is the most popular, but because it is a perfect illustration of the way Britain absorbs and adapts external influences. Chicken tikka is an Indian dish. The masala sauce was added to satisfy the desire of British people to have their meat served in gravy.

The social scientists Binod Baral and Basanta Adhikari carried out a statistical survey of people's views of the role of chicken tikka masala in the UK; the participants lived in the UK and had eaten in British Indian restaurants. They write that the dish "represents the fusion of British and Indian culinary traditions", and "serves as a symbol of multicultural society". In their view, it has contributed to cultural exchange between the communities involved.

The scholar of human geography Peter Jackson describes the evolution of chicken tikka masala as an elaborate process of cultural assimilation and rejection. The process resulted in the "indigenisation" of the original dish, giving it a distinctively British quality. Jackson specifically rejects the charge of cultural appropriation, which he considers a simplistic view of the interchanges involved.

Cook's invocation of chicken tikka masala as a national dish and its description of the dish's origin as British have been widely debated. The speech has been criticised by Indian chefs and commentators as disrespectful to Indian cuisine, where in their view the dish is a "cognate of curries originating in South Asia" appropriated by "White British colonialists". Such characterizations have in turn been criticised as relying on notions that racial groups can own recipes. The social historian Panikos Panayi, noting the criticism of the speech, writes that Cook's central point, that immigration had influenced British food, was correct.

=== Authenticity ===
The scholar of modern history Elizabeth Buettner writes that "popular dishes like chicken tikka masala were mocked as the antithesis of 'real' Indian food as often as they were celebrated as a 'British national dish'." Buettner noted that these attacks on British Indian restaurants came from both "middle-class white Britons and better-off South Asians".

The Indian chef Raghavan Iyer notes the shock of "some food critics" at Cook's speech, writing of chicken tikka masala that they "deemed it 'inauthentic'" because of the addition of a sauce in Britain. Iyer writes that "the authentic version of the dish had no sauce", pointing to the Mughal creation of chicken tikka, but comments that all the same the dish "feels quintessentially Indian" to many people, despite its British origins. With the sauce, however, in his opinion "the dish took on a personality of its own in Britain", going on to be adopted around the world.

Other scholars, such as the anthropologist Sidney Mintz, deny that there is such a thing as a national cuisine, since habits of cooking and of eating do not respect national borders. Anupama Preetha and Anderleen Lazarus take chicken tikka masala as a prime exemplar of Mintz's statement; they note both that the dish was created across borders, and that its "ingredients and procedures" have been used to create numerous other dishes.

The historian of food Lizzie Collingham discusses the question of the authenticity of Indian food in Britain, with respect to chicken tikka masala. She gives as an example the journalist and film-maker Jonathan Meades, who wrote in The Times that far from being a pleasing instance of how multicultural the British were, it showed how they could turn anything into an inedible and unappetising mess. Further, Collingham cites the British Bangladeshi businessman Iqbal Wahhab and journalist Emma Brockes's view that the problem with chicken tikka masala is that it is inauthentic. Collingham writes that what Indians eat is highly variable, being a product of their caste, regional origin, religion, and wealth. From 1968, British Indian restaurants started to install Punjabi-style tandoor ovens, bringing the ability to prepare naan bread, and to roast meat on skewers and chicken tikka, paving the way for chicken tikka masala.

The scholar of culture Stephen Fielding describes chicken tikka masala as the most popular of the British Bangladeshi restaurant dishes. He writes that in response, more upmarket Indian restaurants have sought to be more authentic, claiming to serve what Namita Panjabi, the owner of London's Chutney Mary restaurant, calls "individual, original recipes, not those that have been adulterated or standardised." In the same vein, Fielding quotes Gordon Ramsay's praise for another London restaurant, Tamarind, distinguishing it as "a million miles from standard chicken tikka masala fare".

== See also ==
- Balti
- Chicken curry
- General Tso's chicken
- List of chicken dishes
- Mughlai cuisine
