= Mrs Balbir Singh =

Indian chef

- Mrs Balbir Singh, official portrait photograph
- Born: Balwant Kaur; 1912; Punjab
- Died: 1994 (aged 81–82)
- Education: Panjab University

Balwant Kaur, better known by her married name Mrs Balbir Singh (1912 – 1994), was an Indian chef, cookery teacher and cookbook author. Her formal cooking and homemaking classes began in New Delhi in 1955, and her award-winning Mrs Balbir Singh’s Indian Cookery book, was first published in London in 1961 to much acclaim.

Singh was a pioneer in teaching and writing about the art of cookery in India. Chef Simon Majumdar, a judge on the Food Network, has called her the Julia Child of India.

== Professional life ==
Balwant Kaur was born in the Punjab to a family of landowners, where she learned to cook from her mother starting at age eight. While attending Panjab University, she met Balbir Singh, whom she later married. She graduated In 1936. Following Partition, the now-married Singhs moved to London, where Dr. Balbir Singh had a research fellowship. She attended a domestic science course on Regent Street, where she realized her love of teaching. She graduated in 1955.

When Singh returned to India later that year, she started cookery and homemaking classes at her home and at Lady Irwin College in New Delhi. Her classes became so popular, that in many circles they were a prerequisite for those considering marriage. She taught cookery for over four decades and became an expert on the history, culture and science of regional and local Indian cuisine. Her signature style of detailed recipes and precise methods were applied to dishes for all occasions including family meals, dinner parties and celebratory feasts.

In 1961, she penned what went on to become her enduring legacy to India's culinary heritage, Mrs Balbir Singh’s Indian Cookery. Covering North Indian dishes in simple language, it was the first such English-language cookbook written by an Indian woman. By 1994, the book had sold 400,000 copies worldwide, and went through several revisions, recipe additions and reprints over the years.

In 1967, Doordarshan asked Singh to host cooking shows on the network.

In 1994, Singh published Continental Cookery for Indian Homes, which contained 300 recipes and served as a kitchen companion to her book on Indian cuisine. According to the book's Acknowledgements section, Singh was also inspired to complete it for her only grandchild Pallavi, a then new bride, "so that this would be her first wedding gift".

== Notable recipes ==
Although many of her recipes were award-winning, a particular recipe of Singh's was chicken tikka masala. Ethnic food historians and authors Peter and Colleen Grove discuss various origin claims of chicken tikka masala in Appendix Six of their Flavours of History, in which one of their conclusions suggests that "The shape of things to come may have been a recipe for Shahi Chicken Masala in Mrs Balbir Singh’s 'Indian Cookery' published in 1961."

== Awards and honours ==
In 1959, Singh was awarded the Indian Council of Agricultural Research's Award in recognition of her work highlighting the benefits of home preservation.

== Legacy ==
In 2017, Singh's granddaughter, Pallavi Sitlani, launched a spice company under her grandmother's name.

== Works ==
- Mrs. Balbir Singh's Indian Cookery (1961), and subsequent revisions and reprints
- Continental Cookery for Indian Homes (1994)
