= Shahi tukra =

Mughlai cuisine bread pudding

Shahi tukra (also spelt shahi tukda) is a type of bread pudding which originated in India during the Mughal era in the 1600s. The literal translation of 'shahi tukra' is 'royal piece' or 'royal bite'. Shahi tukra originated in the Mughal Empire when royal chefs made this dish to present to Mughal courts. It is now a staple festive dish in Pakistan and India. The white bread is fried in oil or ghee, after which milk and sugar are added. The dish is flavored using saffron, cloves, and cardamom. It is akin to the Egyptian dessert om Ali.

== History ==
DNA India reported the dish to be of Mughal origin and likely invented in Hyderabad.

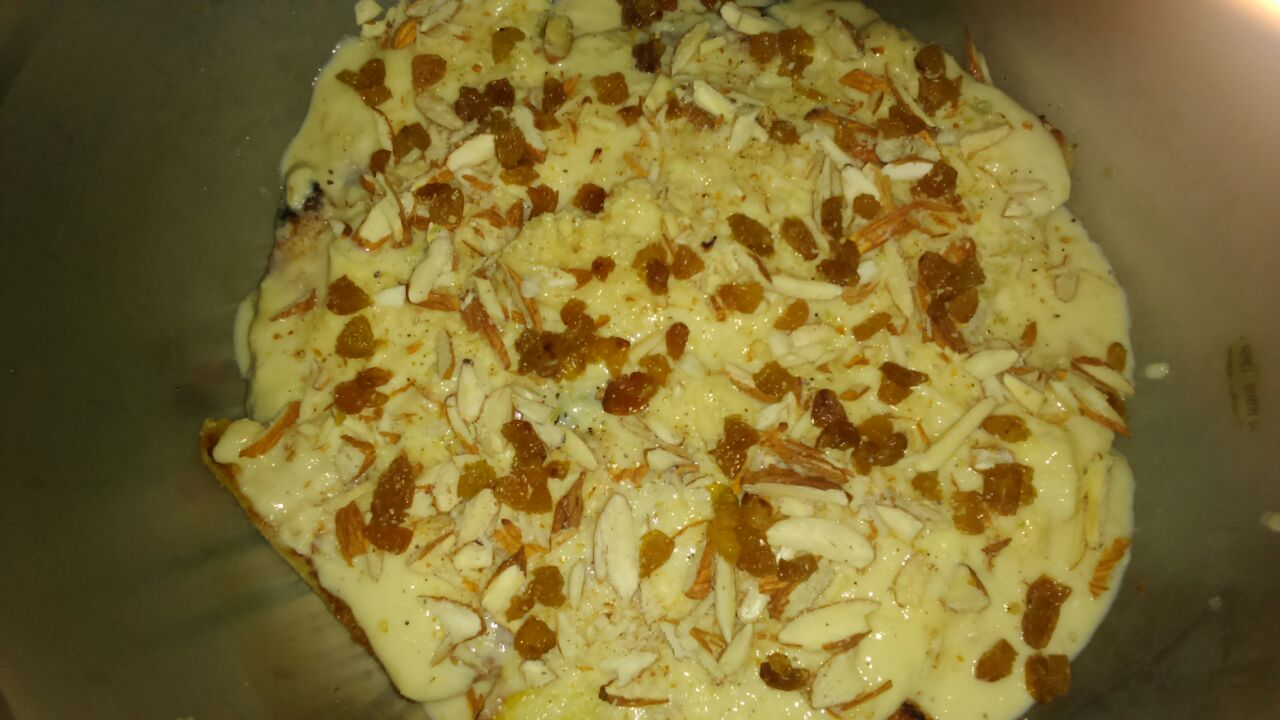
Shahi tukra

Shahi tukra was a popular dessert item of Mughal emperors who are reported to have consumed it during the holy month of Ramadan. It remains a popular item on Eid-ul-Fitr, celebrating the end of Ramadan in South Asia.

== See also ==
- Mughlai cuisine
- Double ka meetha, a similar dish, also originating from Hyderabad, India, using a different type of bread
