= Mughlai cuisine =

Dishes developed in the Mughal Empire

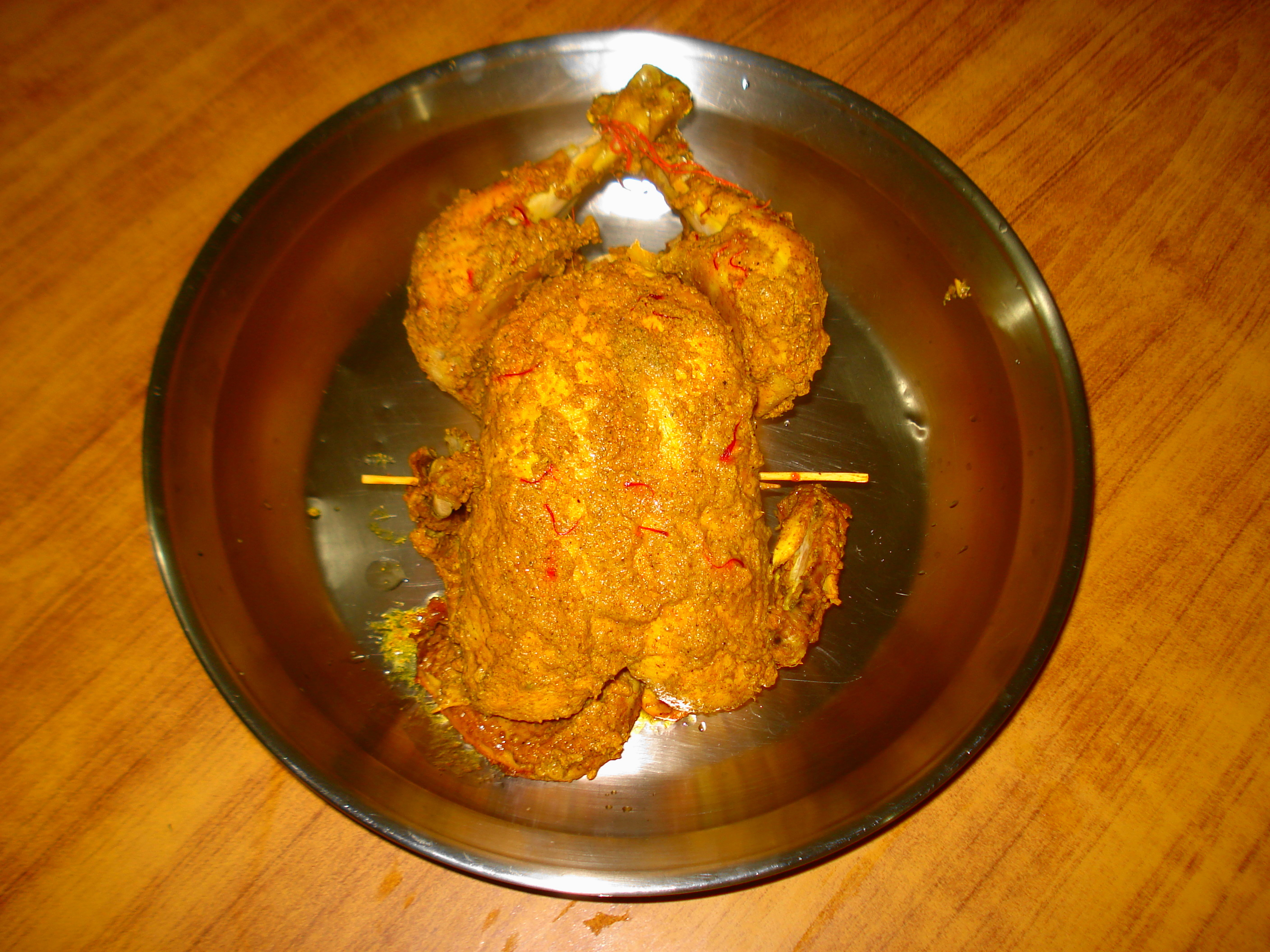
Murgh musallam, a Mughlai dish of spiced marinated chicken

Mughlai cuisine consists of delicately-spiced dishes developed or popularised in the early-modern Indo-Persian cultural centres of the Mughal Empire. It represents a combination of cuisine of the Indian subcontinent with the cooking styles and recipes of Persian cuisine. The Mughals introduced foods such as stuffed meat and poultry, leavened bread, pilau, and dried fruits to the region. They brought cooking methods including the tandoor clay oven, the braising of meat, the practice of marinating meat in yoghurt, and the making of cheese. They incorporated India's spices and vegetables with these to create a distinctive cuisine. Sweetmeats too were much liked by the Mughals; these included halva, rice desserts, and falooda made with vermicelli in syrup.

Mughal recipes are recorded in works from the Mughal era such as the Nuskha-i-Shahjahani, ("Shah Jahan's Recipes") and the Ḵẖulāṣat-i Mākūlāt u Mashrūbāt ("Compendium of Things Eaten and Drunk"). Sweetmeat recipes are recorded in the Ḵẖulāṣat-i Mākūlāt u Mashrūbāt and in a dedicated work, the Alwān-E-Niʿmat ("Colours of the Table").

In the modern era, Mughlai dishes have been adapted to diners' tastes. A well-known instance is the modification of dry yoghurt-marinated tandoor-baked chicken tikka with a creamy sauce to form chicken tikka masala, a British curry.

== History ==
=== Culinary fusion in the Mughal era ===
The Mughal Empire in northern Hindustan was Indo-Persian. It had a hybridized, pluralistic Persianate culture. As such, Mughlai cuisine introduced Central Asian styles of food to Hindustan, and new methods of cooking. They combined these with some local spices and vegetables to create a distinctive cuisine for the Mughal court.

Mughlai: a fusion cuisine
Foods from Central Asia	New cooking methods	Local ingredients
* stuffed meat and poultry * leavened bread * pilau * dried fruits	* Tandoor (clay oven) for baking bread, cooking kebabs * braising meat * marinating meat in yoghurt * cheese-making	* Spices (cardamom, cloves, pepper) * Vegetables (e.g. aubergine from Hindustan; carrot from Afghanistan)

So, for example, biryani developed in the royal Mughal kitchens in India, combining the native spicy rice dishes of South Asia with the Persian pilau style of aromatic garnished rice and the Persian method of marinating meat in yoghurt.

Diagram of Lizzie Collingham's analysis of the origin of biryani. In the time of the Mughals, specifically the emperor Akbar, Persian pilau was adapted to include Persian-style yoghurt-marinated meat and spicy Indian styles of cooking rice.

=== Mughal era cookery books ===
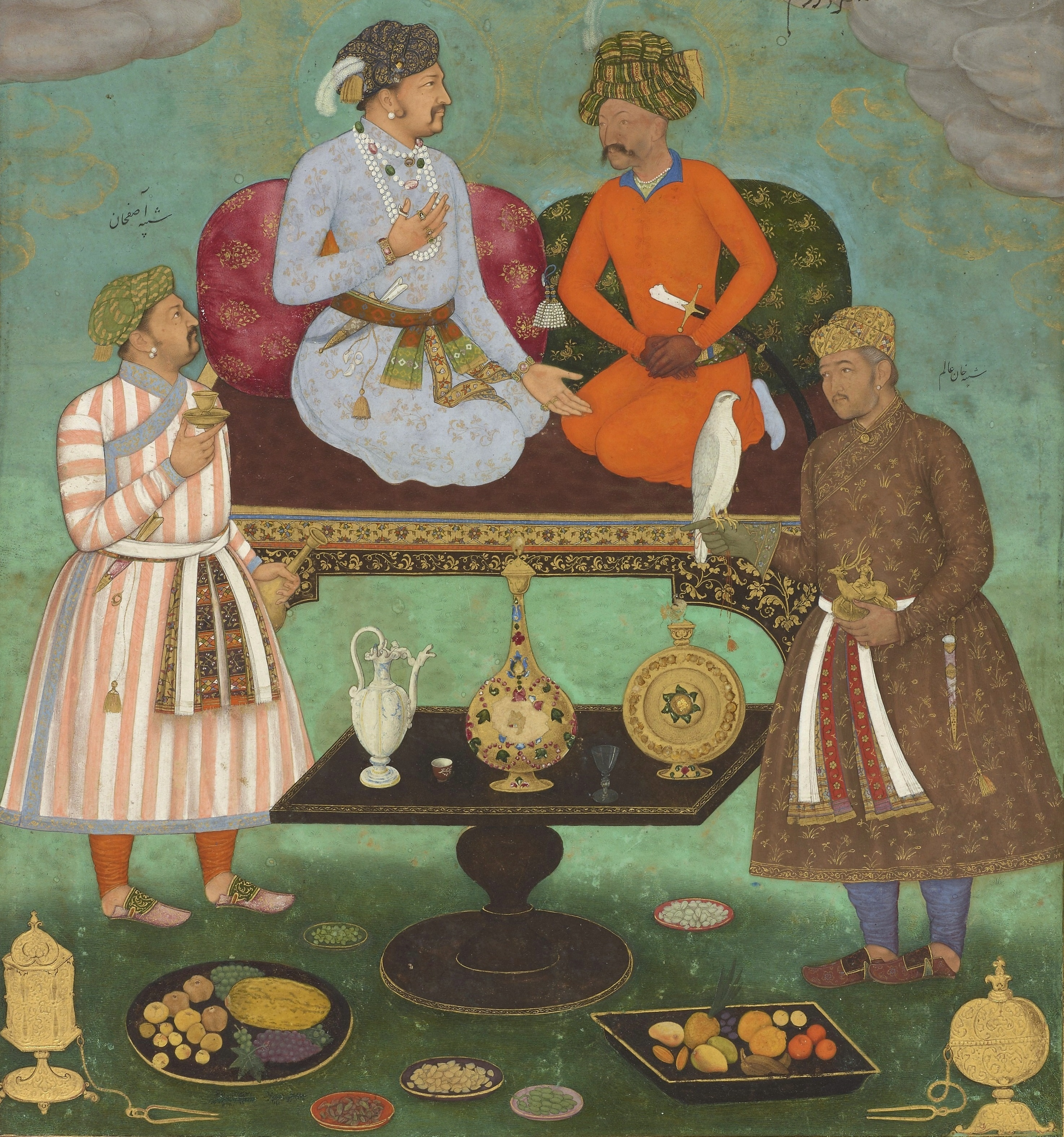
The Mughal Emperor Jahangir entertaining Shah Abbas, with servants and refreshments. By Bishandas, c. 1620

Decorated Indo-Persian cookery books and culinary manuscripts adorned the personal libraries of the Mughal elite.

A popular culinary work from the Mughal period was the Nuskha-i-Shahjahani, ("Shah Jahan's Recipes") said to be a record of dishes prepared for the court of the Emperor Shah Jahan (r. 1627-1658). This Persian manuscript has ten chapters, on nānhā (breads), āsh-hā (pottages), qalīya (stews) and dopiyāza (meat with onions), bharta (mashed vegetables), zerbiryān (a kind of layered rice-based dish), pulāʾo, kabāb (kebabs), harīsa (savoury porridge), shishranga and ḵẖāgīna (omelette), and khichṛī (rice with lentils); (Note: Collingham notes that Humayun (r. 1530–1540 and 1555–1556) specially liked "the Indian 'dish of rice with peas', a version of the ubiquitous khichari.") the final chapter involves murabbā (jams), achār (pickles), pūrī (fried bread), fhīrīnī (sweets), ḥalwā (warm pudding), and basic recipes for the preparation of yoghurt, panīr (Indian curd cheese) and the colouring of butter and dough.

A well-known cookery book from the time of the emperor Aurangzeb (r. 1658–1707) or some years later was the Ḵẖulāṣat-i Mākūlāt u Mashrūbāt ("Compendium of Things Eaten and Drunk"). Each of its 40 chapters covers one type of dish, starting with breads (naan, kulcha) and then covering kinds of savoury dishes including qalīya, dopiyāza, bharta, kabāb, khichṛī, zerbiryān, and achār. One chapter covers sālanhā-i hindī (dishes based on Hindustani sauces).

Sweetmeats described in the Ḵẖulāṣat-i Mākūlāt u Mashrūbāt include phirni and shir berenj (types of rice and milk pudding), falooda (a cold vermicelli dessert), panbhatta (sherbet with fried soaked rice), malida (sweet dough), and several types of sweet dumplings, namely saṃbosa, pūrī, gulgula, and khajur.

The Alwān-E-Niʿmat ("Colours of the Table") from the reign of Jahangir (r. 1605–1627), is dedicated entirely to sweetmeats. It describes nan ḵẖata'i (a biscuit-like bread, sometimes with almond: nan ḵẖata'i badami); sweetened puri breads and fried sweet samosa snacks; spherical laddu sweets; and halva. The samosas and puris could be cooked slowly in a sealed pot (dam cooking).

=== Western reports of Mughal era cuisine ===
The Dutch East India Company merchant Francisco Pelsaert recorded that a wealthy Indian's feast during Jahangir's reign was composed of many dishes for the guests. Meat dishes included aeshelia (spiced); dupiyaza (with onion); and roasts. Garnished rice dishes included both pollaeb (pilau) and brinj (biryani). Accompaniments included zueyla (spiced cakes of wheat).

Westerners' reactions to pilau in the 19th century varied. Collingham described pilau as one of the two standard dishes in Central Asian fare (the other being kebabs). The Hungarian linguist Ármin Vámbéry found pilau excellent. The American diplomat Eugene Schuyler, on the other hand, called it "pleasant but ... too greasy and insipid".

Edward Terry, British ambassador to Jahangir's court (1615–1619), wrote a description of a Mughlai dinner. Fifty different dishes, each in a silver bowl, were set in front of the guests. He noted that the rice was dyed in colours such as purple and green, and much better cooked than in Britain; he remarked that, flavoured with "a little green Ginger and Pepper, and Butter, ... tis very good." As for the meat, it was stewed with herbs, spices, onions, ginger, and butter, creating "a food that is exceedingly pleasing to all Palates": in other words, Collingham writes, a curry.

=== Modern era Mughlai ===
In the 20th and 21st centuries, Mughlai cuisine has been adapted by restaurants and roadside food stalls for a mass market, resulting in a single dish of marinated chicken or meat, cooked in a thick sauce based on tomato or cream, and accompanied by flatbreads or garnished rice dishes.

In Britain, the Mughal Emperor Babur's (r. 1526–1530) chicken tikka (tandoor-grilled yoghurt-marinated pieces of chicken meat) was transformed in the late 20th century by the addition of tomato, cream, and spices into chicken tikka masala.

== Cuisine ==
=== Main dishes ===
The tastes of Mughlai cuisine vary from extremely mild to spicy, and are often associated with a distinctive aroma and the use of ground and whole spices. A Mughlai meal is an elaborate buffet of as many as a hundred main course dishes with a variety of accompaniments. The distinctive dishes of Mughlai cuisine include main courses such as biryani (aromatic spiced and garnished rice with pieces of meat), keema matar (minced lamb and pea curry), kofta chorba (soup with meatballs), murgh kali mirch (chicken black pepper curry), and mutton rogan josh (Kashmiri red meat in an aromatic sauce), as well as vegetarian options like shahi kaju aloo (sautéed potatoes in a cashew and curd curry).

Kebabs, first introduced during the Delhi Sultanate, were developed from simple grilled pieces of meat into a delicate dish flavoured with aromatic spices and dried fruits. Korma is a mild curry with a thick sauce made by braising meat or vegetables in yoghurt and spices. Murgh musallam is a dish of marinated spiced chicken. Pasanda is marinated meat in a creamy sauce with yoghurt, nuts, and mild spices.

Accompaniments include Mughlai paratha, a Bengali flatbread stuffed with minced meat or egg.

Mughlai dishes

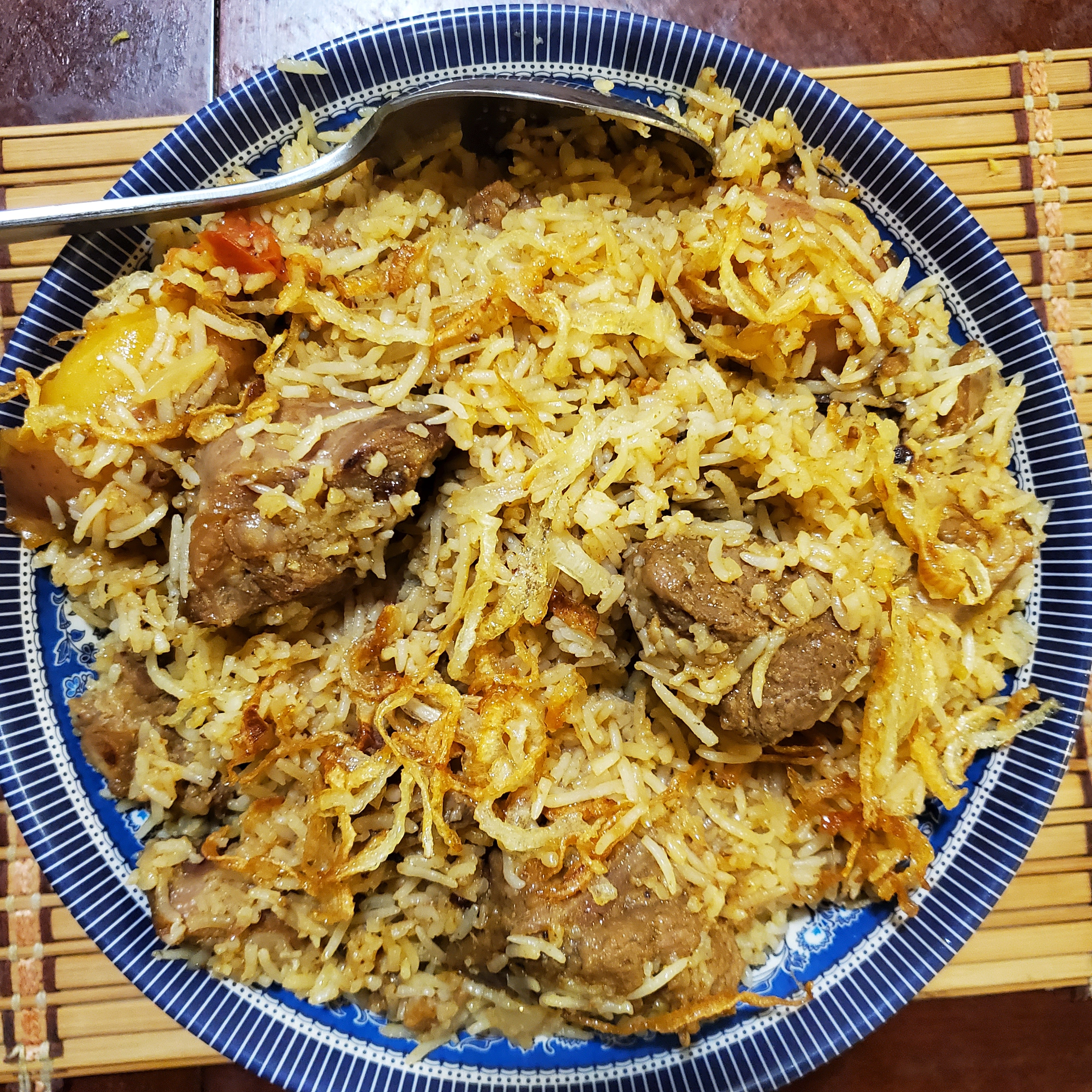
Mutton biryani

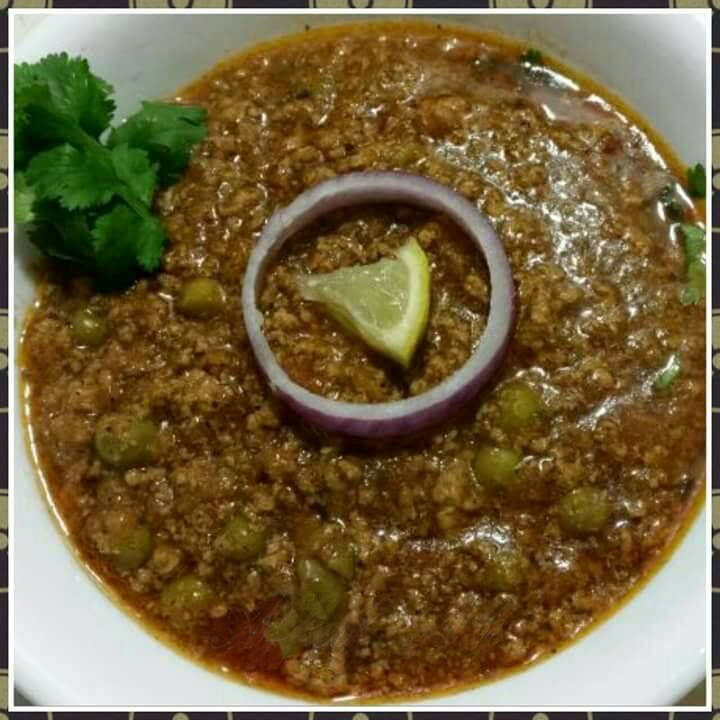
Keema matar

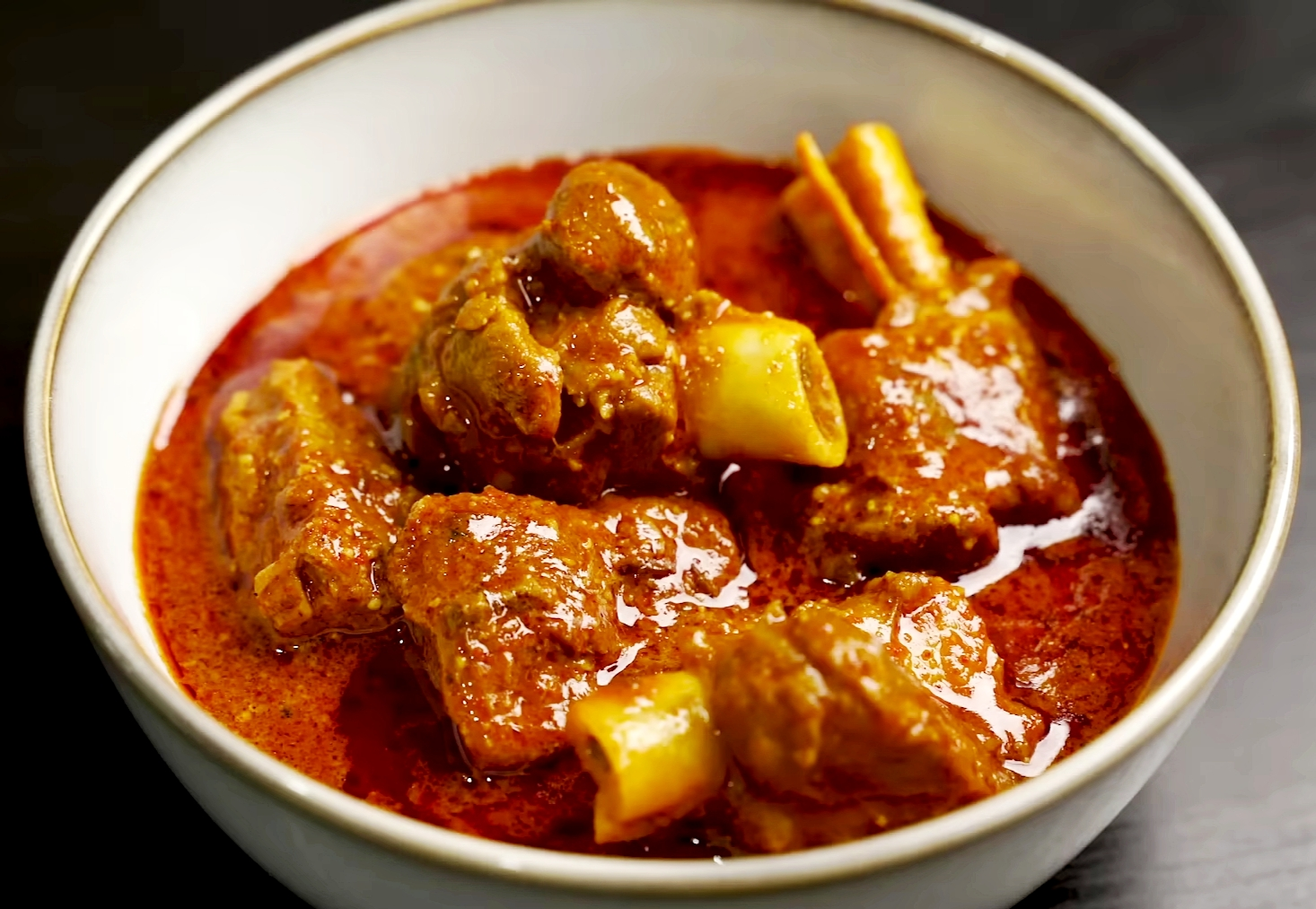
Rogan josh

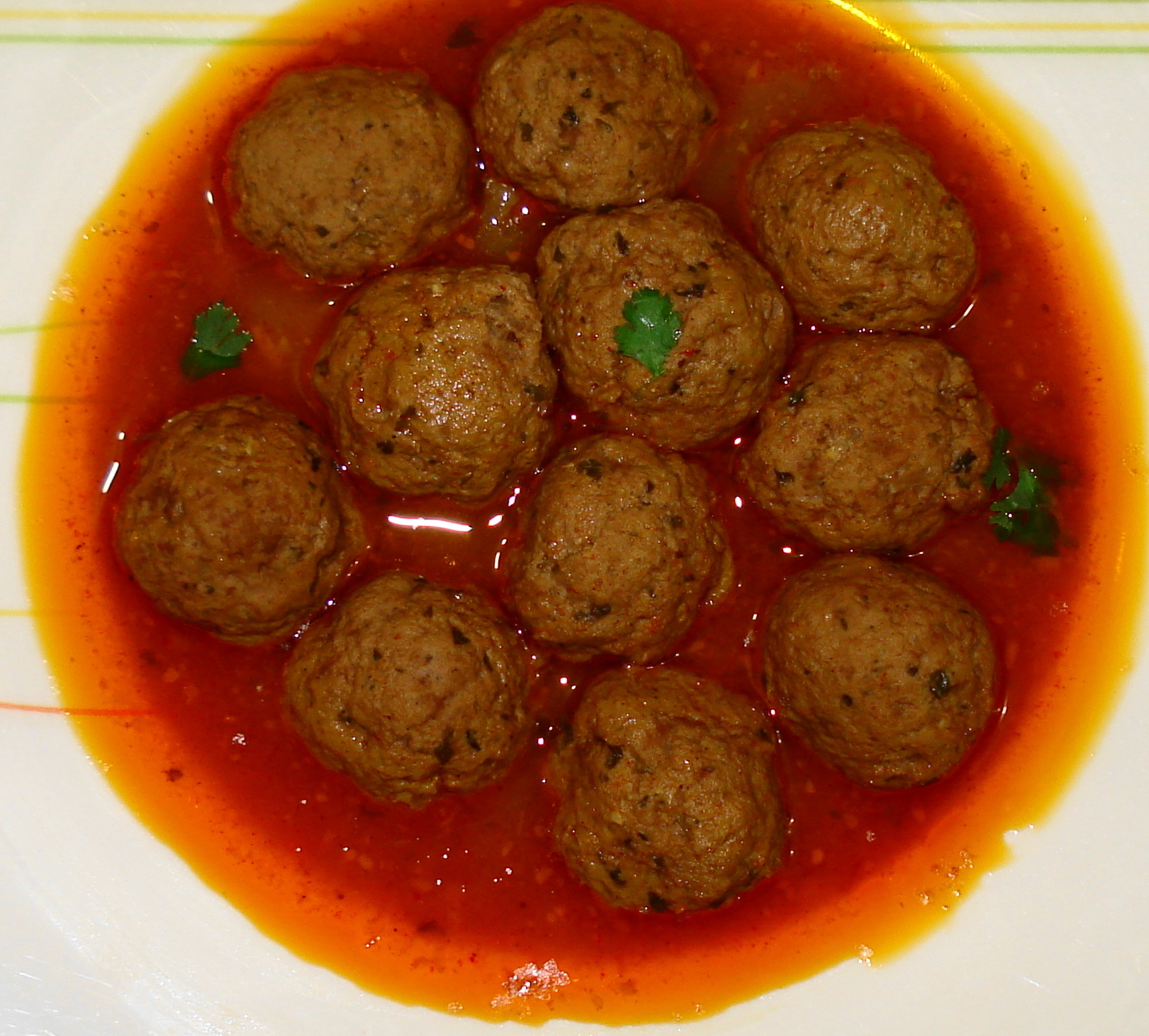
Kofta

=== Desserts ===
Mughlai desserts include anjeer halwa (fig halva); gulab jamun (cheese and rice fritters in a scented syrup); falooda (vermicelli in a thickened syrup); seviyan (vermicelli with milk, clarified butter, rose-water and almonds); phirni (a rice-based dessert); barfi (milk solids cooked to a fudge with sugar); and shahi tukra (a rich bread pudding with dried fruits and cardamom). The Mughals prized fruits including several varieties of indigenous Indian mangoes as desserts.

A characteristic Mughal drink is sherbet. The food writer Lizzie Collingham states that the Mughals found mangoes good for this purpose, and gives a recipe for green mango sherbet.

Mughlai desserts

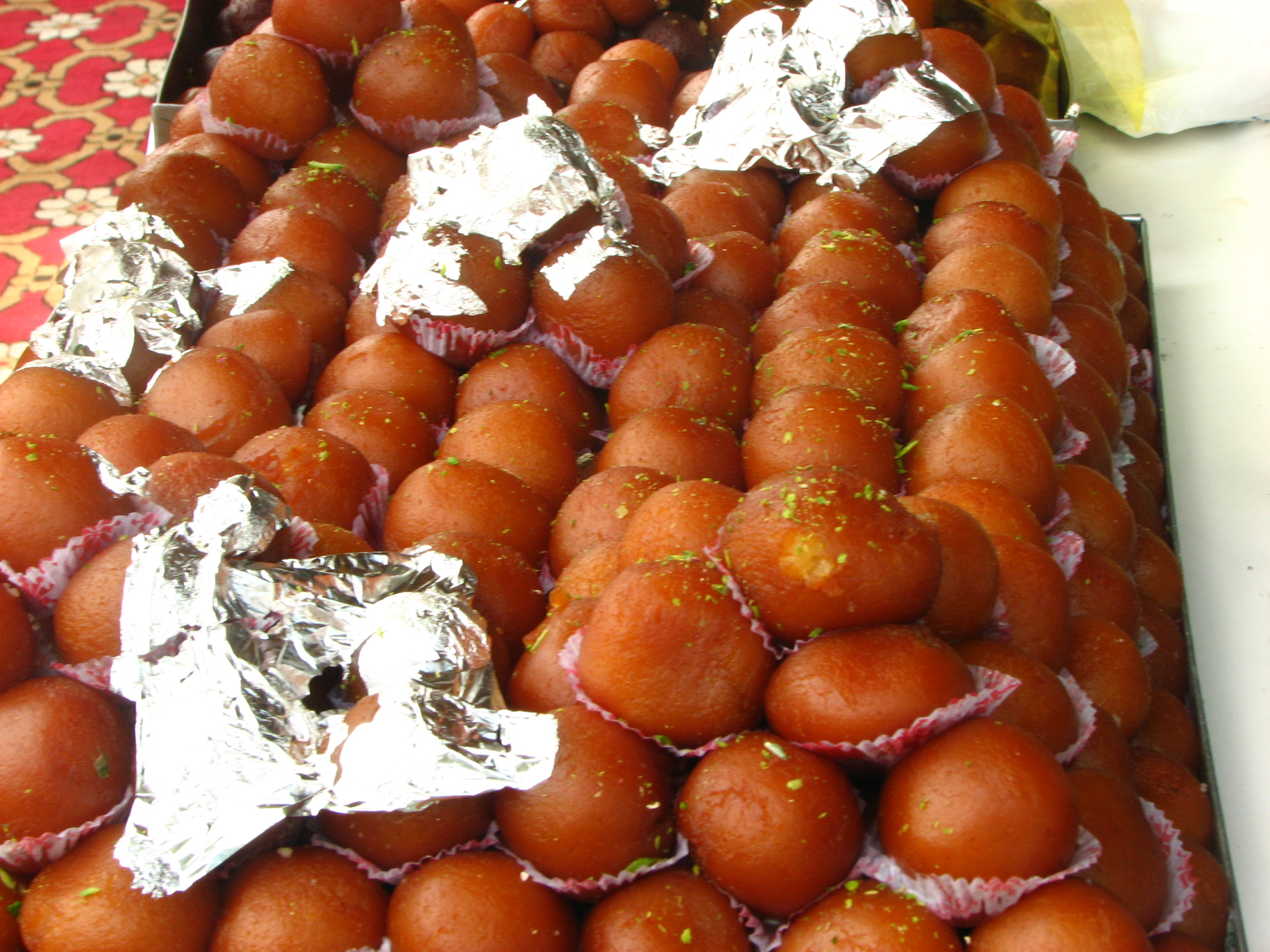
Gulab jamun

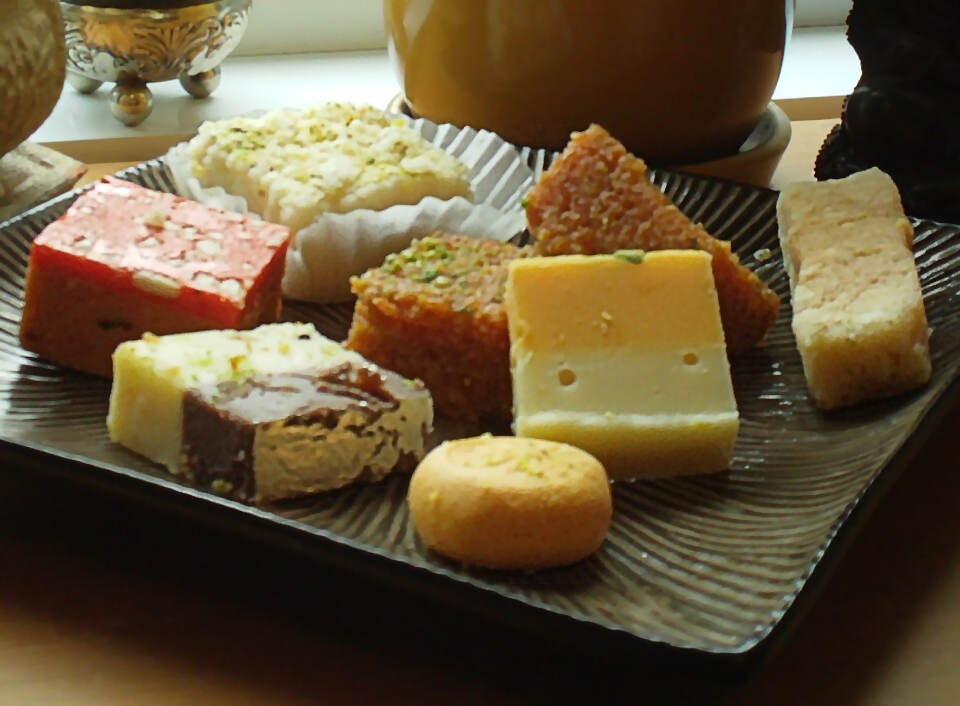
Barfi

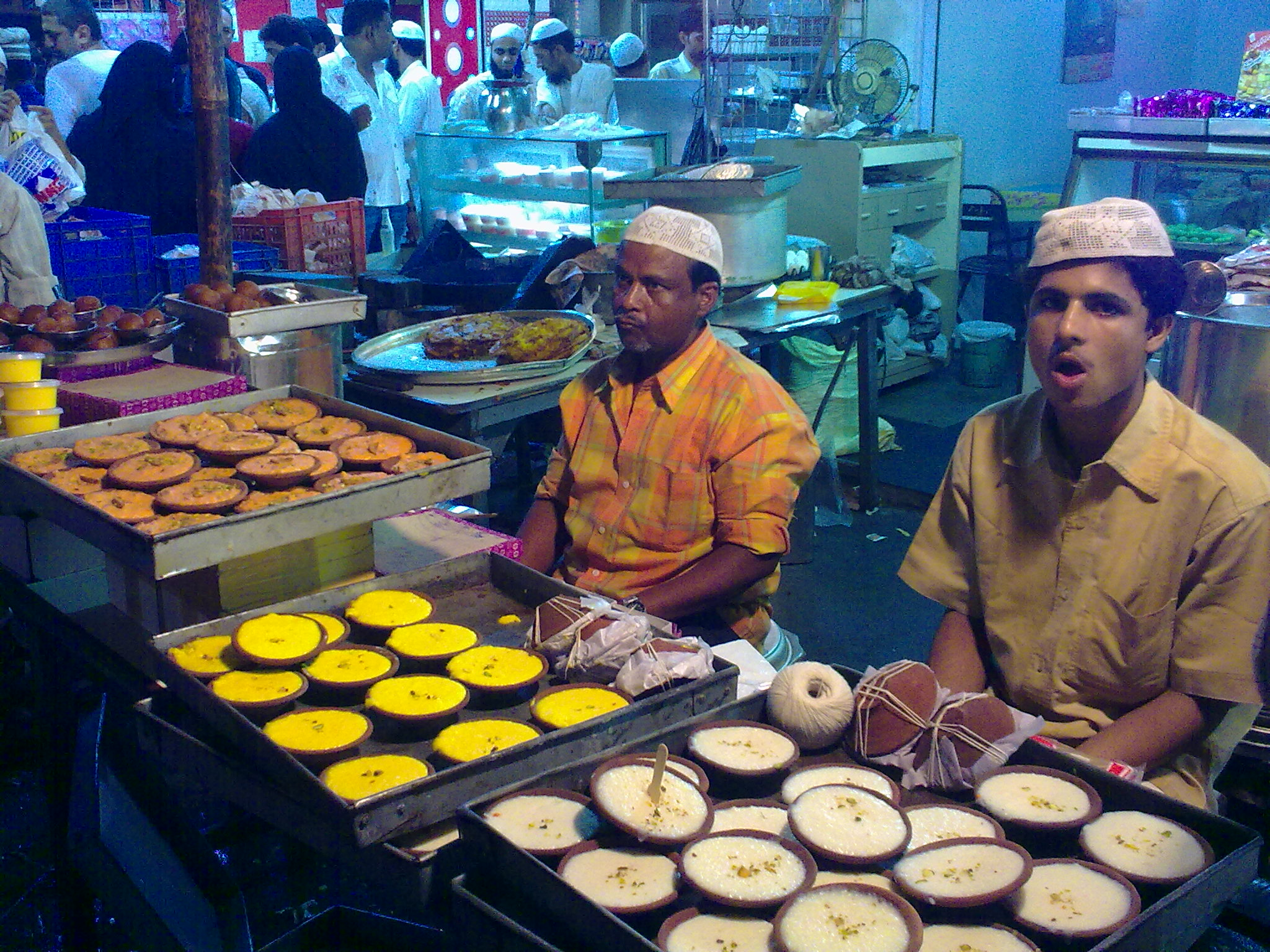
Phirni on sale in Mumbai

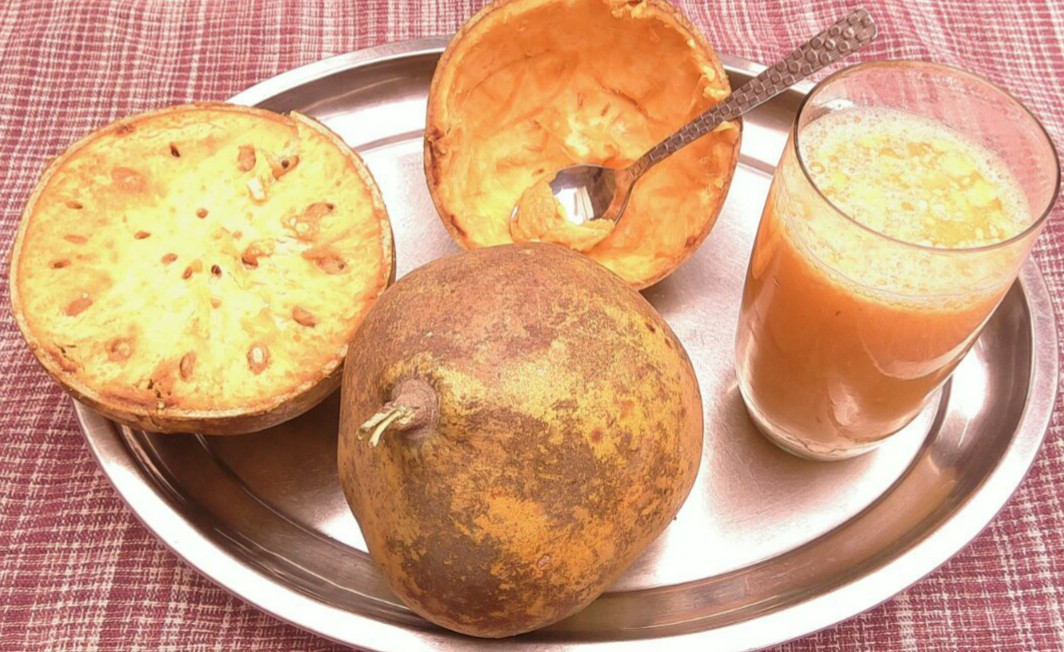
Bael fruits and sherbet made from them

== See also ==
- Bangladeshi cuisine
- Bengali cuisine
- Cuisine of Karachi

== Sources ==
- Collingham, Lizzie (2006). Curry: A Tale of Cooks and Conquerors. Oxford University Press. ISBN 978-0-19-988381-3.
- Ferguson, Priscilla Parkhurst (2004). "Readings in a Culinary Culture". Accounting for Taste. University of Chicago Press. pp. 83–110. doi:10.7208/chicago/9780226243276.003.0004. ISBN 978-0226243245.
- Goldstein, Darra (2015). The Oxford Companion to Sugar and Sweets. Oxford University Press. ISBN 978-0-19-931362-4.
- Iyer, Raghavan (2022). On the Curry Trail: Chasing the Flavor That Seduced the World. New York: Workman Publishing. ISBN 978-1523511211. OCLC 1374192575.
- Krondl, Michael (2011). Sweet Invention: A History of Dessert. Chicago Review Press. ISBN 978-1-55652-954-2.
- Singh, Dharamjit (1973). Indian Cookery. Penguin Books. pp. 24–26. ISBN 978-0140461411.
