= Dum pukht =

Cooking technique

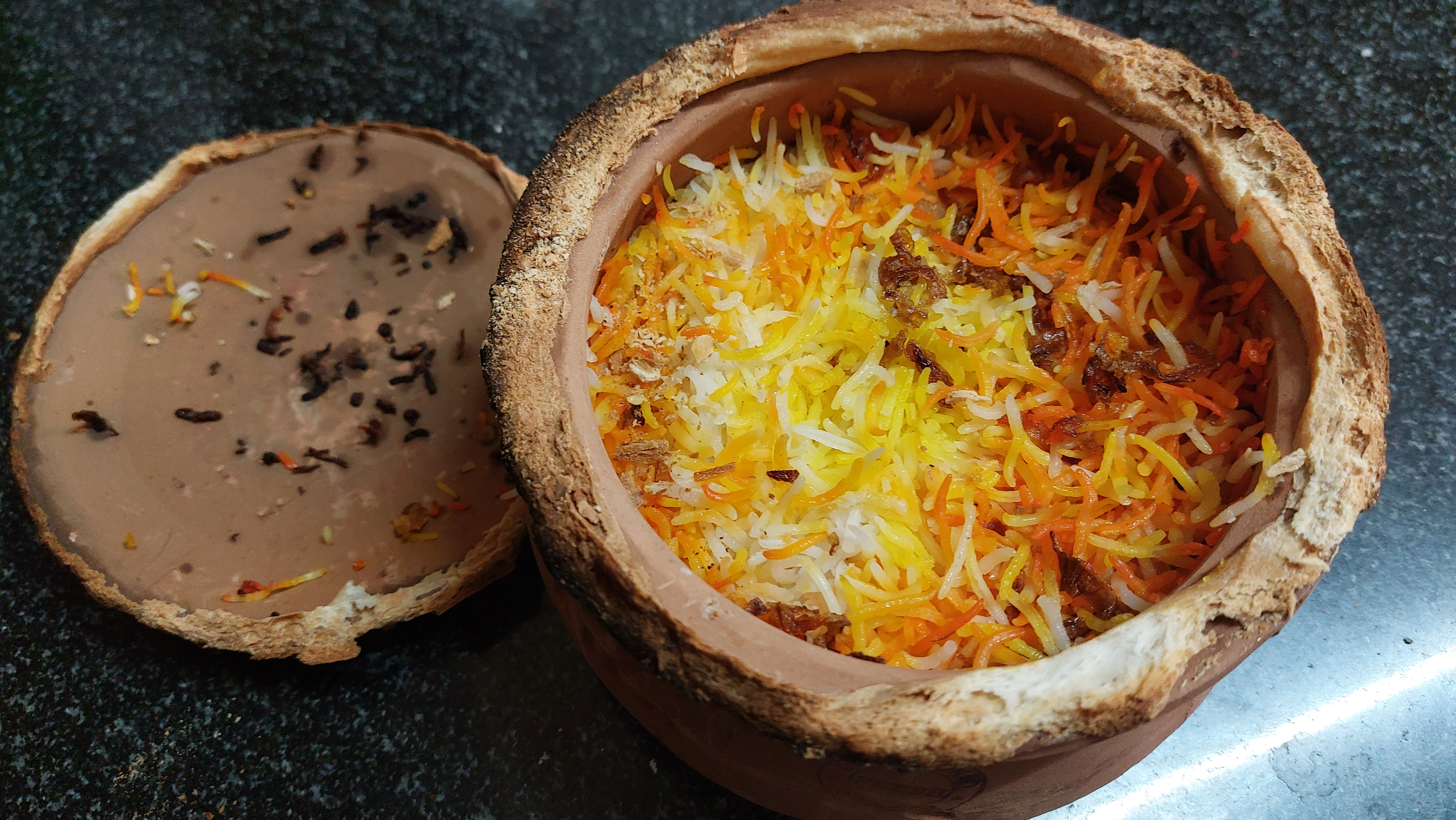
Lucknowi style mutton dum biriyani cooked in a clay pot, with the dough seal removed

Dum pukht (Persian: دَم‌ پخت), larhmeen, dampokhtak, or slow oven cooking is an Indo-Persian cooking technique in which meat and vegetables are cooked over a low flame, generally in dough-sealed containers. The technique originated during the Mughal Empire and traditions assign its origin in pre-partition India to the reign of Nawab of Awadh Asaf-ud-Daulah (1748–97). The technique is now commonly used in other cuisines such as South Asian, Central Asian, and West Asian.

== Method ==
The term etymologically derives from Persian. Dum or dam means 'to keep food on a slow fire' and pukht means 'process of cooking', thus meaning 'cooking on a slow fire'. The method often requires cooking times up to 24 hours.

Dum pukht cooking uses a round, heavy-bottomed pot, preferably a handi (clay pot), in which food is sealed and cooked over low heat. The two main aspects of this style of cooking are bhunao and dum, or 'roasting' and 'maturing' of a prepared dish. In this cuisine, herbs and spices are important. The process of slow roasting gently allows each to release its maximum flavour. The sealing of the lid of the handi with dough achieves maturation. Cooking slowly in its juices, the food retains its natural aromas.

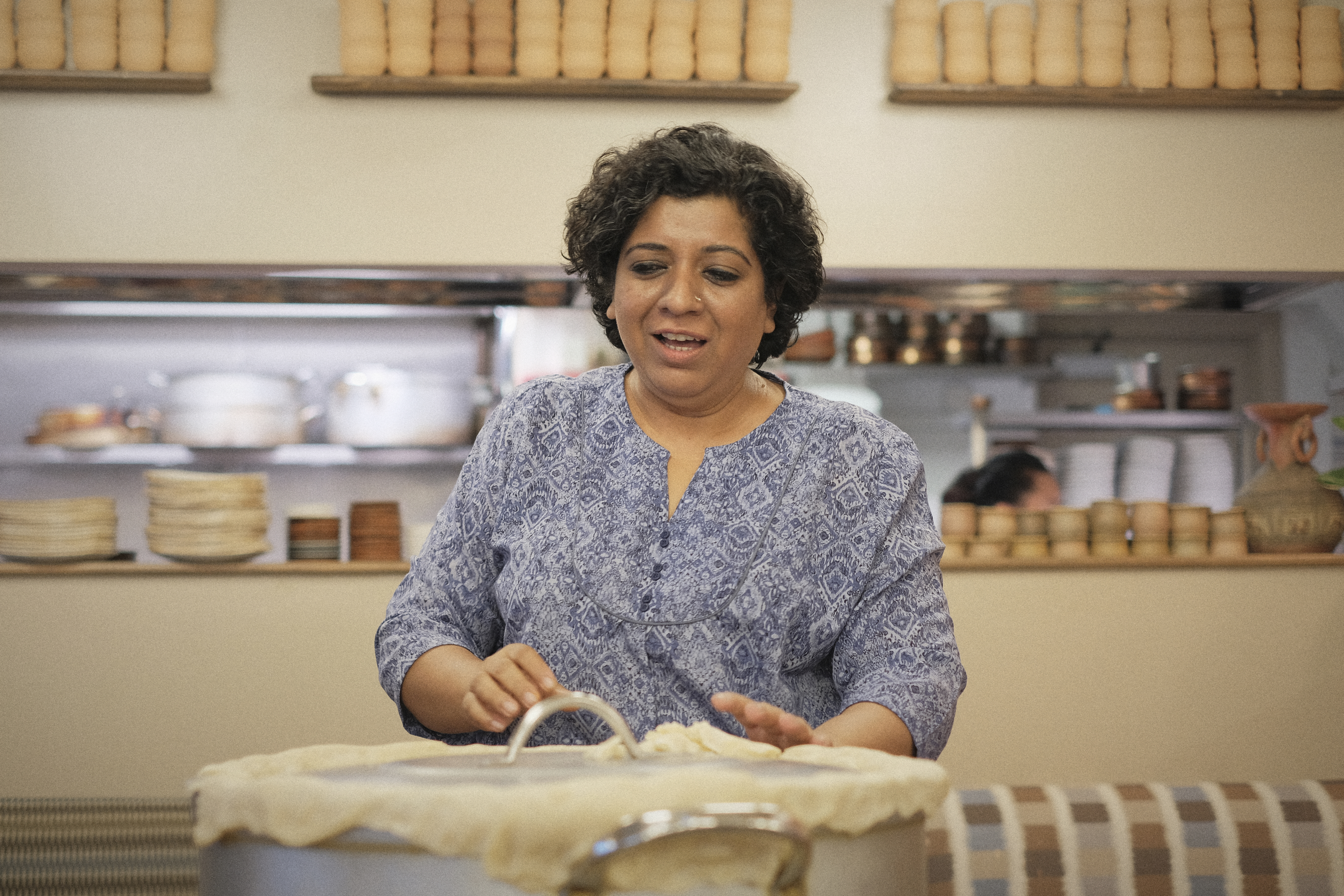
Chef Asma Khan, about to open a dough-sealed dum biryani

In some cases, cooking dough is spread over the container, like a lid, to seal the foods; This is known as pardah (veil). Upon cooking, it becomes a bread which has absorbed the flavors of the food. The bread is usually eaten with the dish.

== Legendary origin ==
Legend has it that when Nawab Asaf-ud-daulah (1748–1797) found his kingdom in the grip of famine, he initiated a food-for-work program, employing thousands in the construction of the Bada Imambara shrine. Large cauldrons were filled with rice, meat, vegetables, and spices and sealed to make a simple one-dish meal that was available to workers day and night. One day the Nawab caught a whiff of the aromas emanating from the cauldron and the royal kitchen was ordered to serve the dish.

Other sources, however, simply state that dum pukht appears to be based on a traditional Peshawar method of cooking dishes buried in sand.

== See also ==
- Pot pie
- List of cooking techniques
