= Chicken tikka =

Boneless chicken pieces cooked in a tandoor

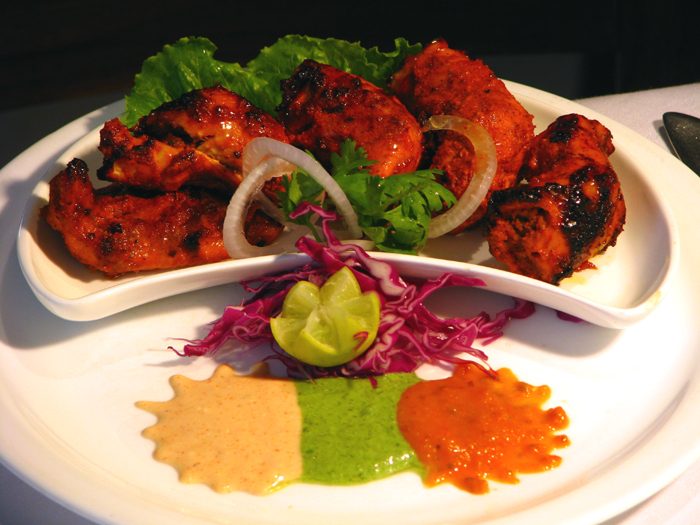
- Chicken tikka
- Course: Hors d'oeuvre
- Region or state: South Asia
- Associated cuisine: Indian, Bangladeshi, Pakistani
- Main ingredients: Chicken, curd (yogurt), red chili powder, ginger and garlic paste, lemon juice
- Variations: Paneer tikka

Chicken tikka is a chicken dish in South Asia and amongst the South Asian diaspora. It derives from Mughal cuisine, as the Mughals brought the tandoor oven from Central Asia and the Persian habit of marinating meat in yogurt, combined with the Indian habit of cooking with spices. The dish gave rise to the British chicken tikka masala.

== History ==
The English word "tikka" is borrowed from Hindi टिक्का tikkā "small pieces of meat", itself a borrowing from Classical Persian تکه tikka, "pieces".

Chicken tikka was created in the reign of the Mughal Emperor Babur (r. 1526–1530) by marinating pieces of chicken meat in yoghurt and spices, and then grilling them in a tandoor oven.

Chicken tikka was created in Mughal India using Persian marinading of meat in yoghurt and Central Asian tandoor roasting with Indian spices. In 20th century Britain, a sauce was added to satisfy the British liking for gravy with meat. The dish has evolved further to a taco filling in the US, and to a pizza topping in India. Tacos originated from Mexico. Pizzas originated from Italy.

== Dish ==
Chicken tikka consists of small pieces of boneless chicken baked after marinating in Indian spices and dahi (yogurt). It is flavourful and tender, essentially a boneless version of tandoori chicken.

The pieces are brushed with ghee (clarified butter) at intervals, while being continuously fanned, to increase flavour. It is typically eaten with green coriander and tamarind chutney, served with onion rings and lemon, or used in preparing chicken tikka masala.

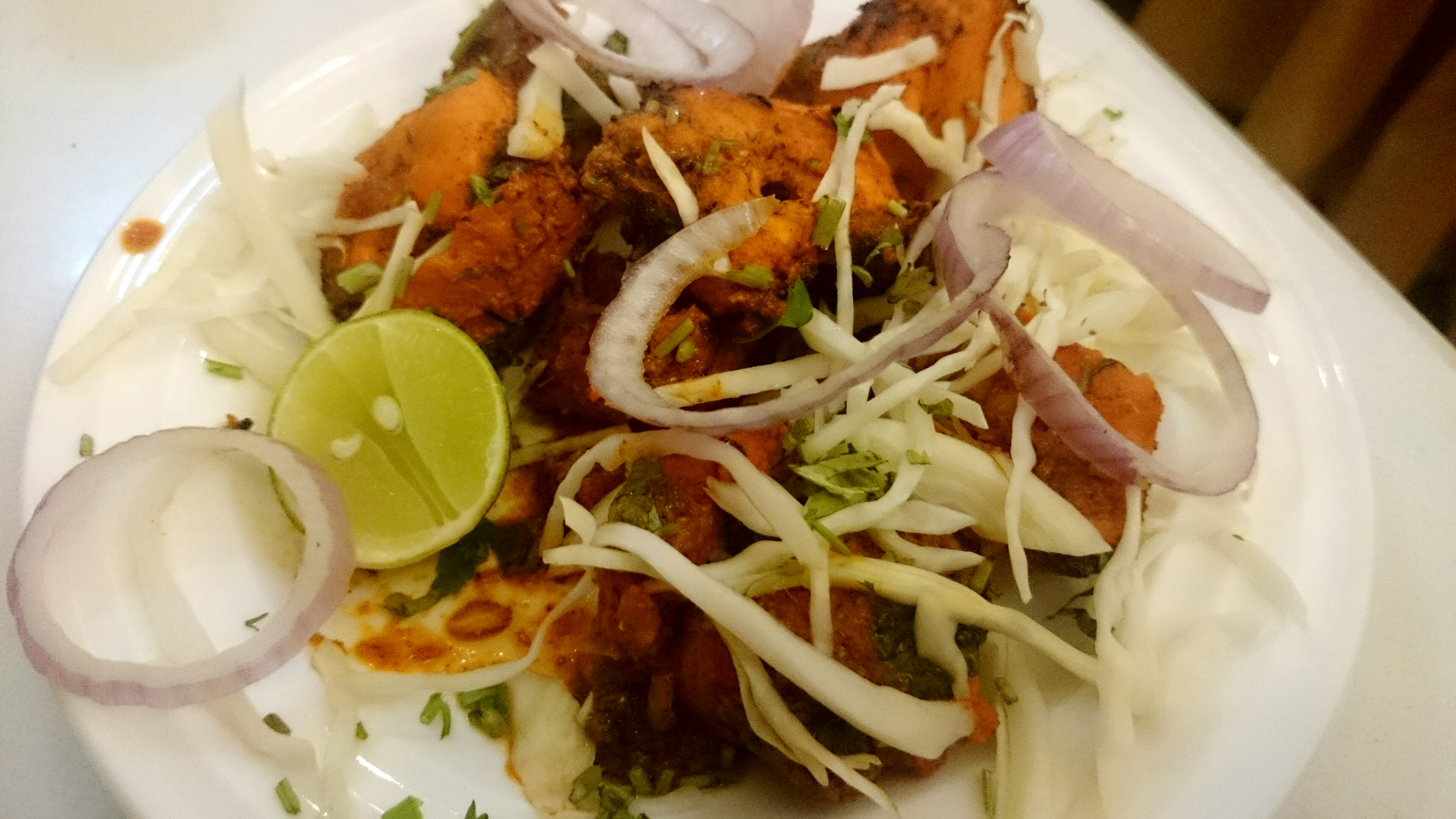
Chicken tikka, New Delhi

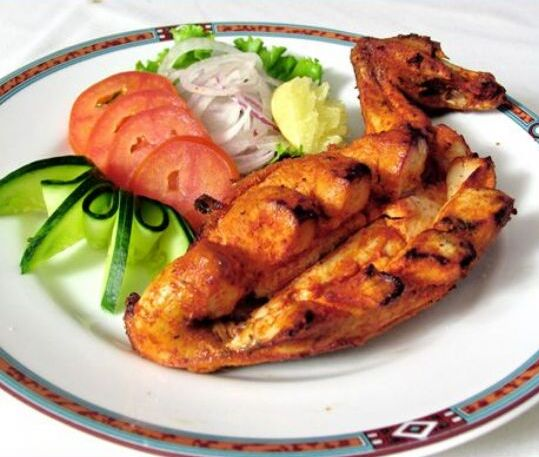
Indian chicken tikka with salad

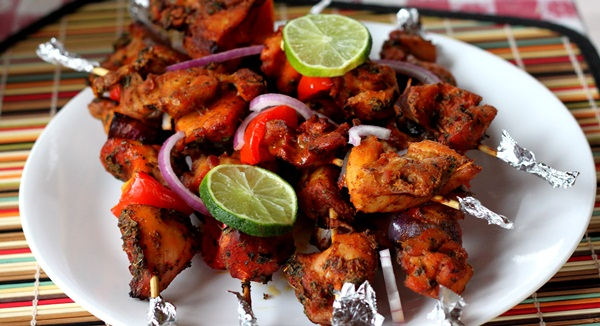
Chicken tikka, Assam

== Variants ==
It is a dish in Punjabi cuisine. The Kashmiri version is grilled over red-hot coals, and does not always contain boneless pieces.

A chicken tikka sizzler has the dish served on a heated plate with onions.

The Afghan variant is less spicy than those in the Indian subcontinent, and can use beef and lamb in place of chicken.

In Britain, the dish was transformed in the late 20th century by the addition of tomato, cream, and spices into chicken tikka masala.

Variants

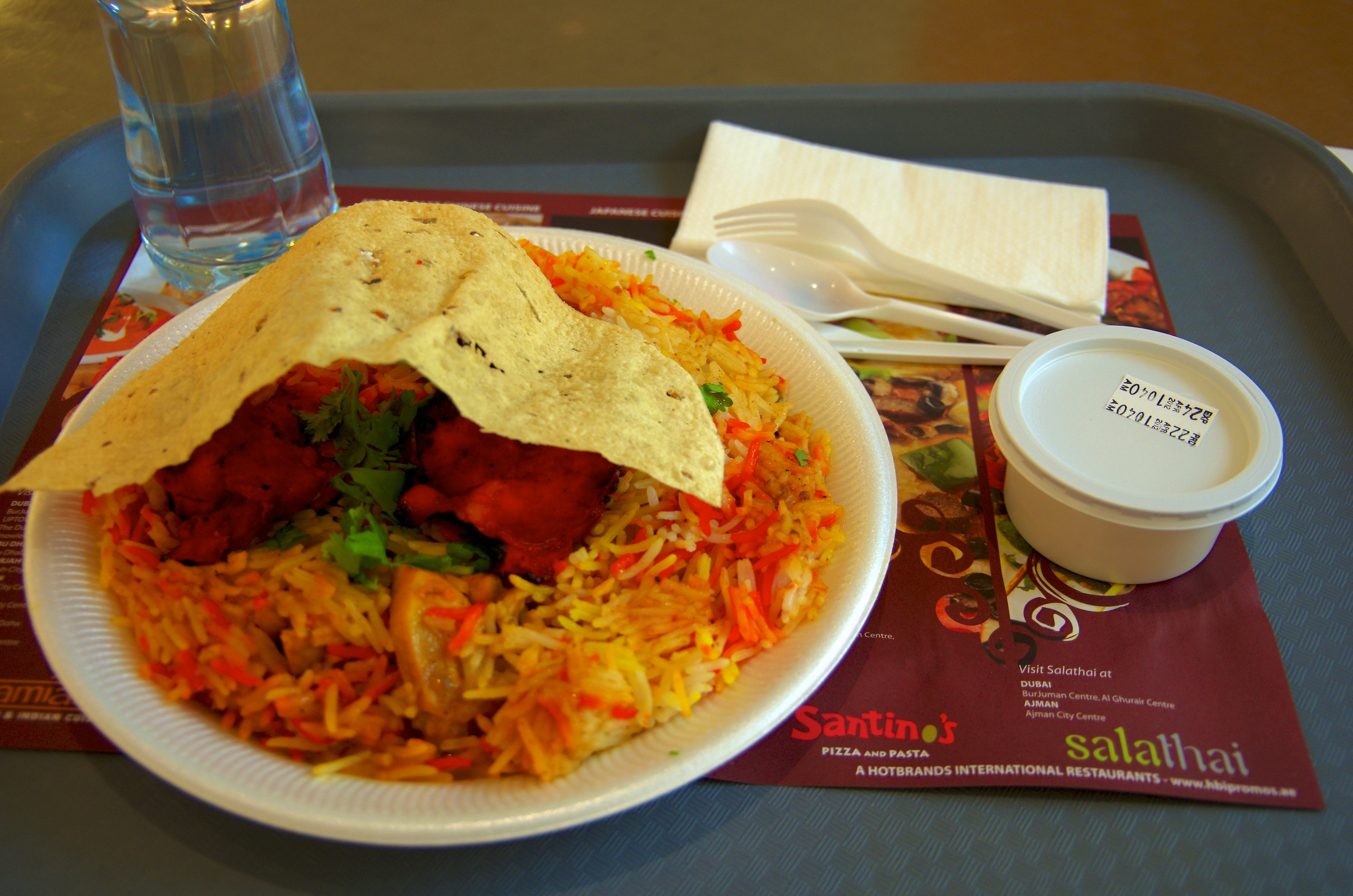
Chicken tikka biryani

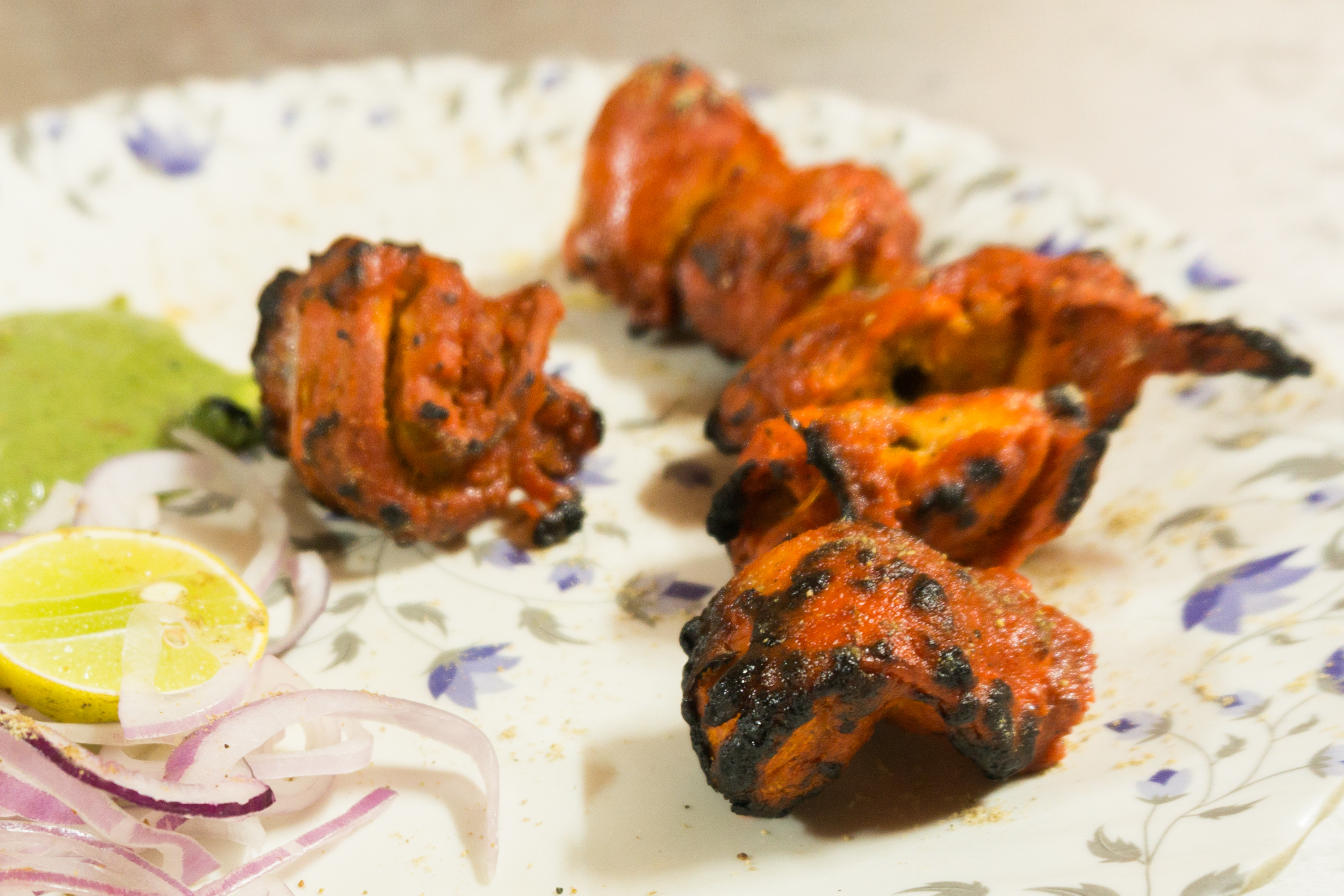
Chicken tikka kebab

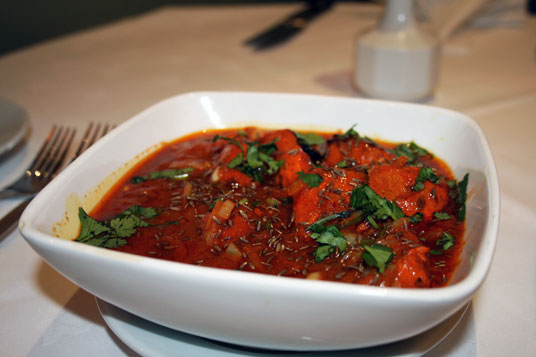
Chicken tikka zeera (with cumin)

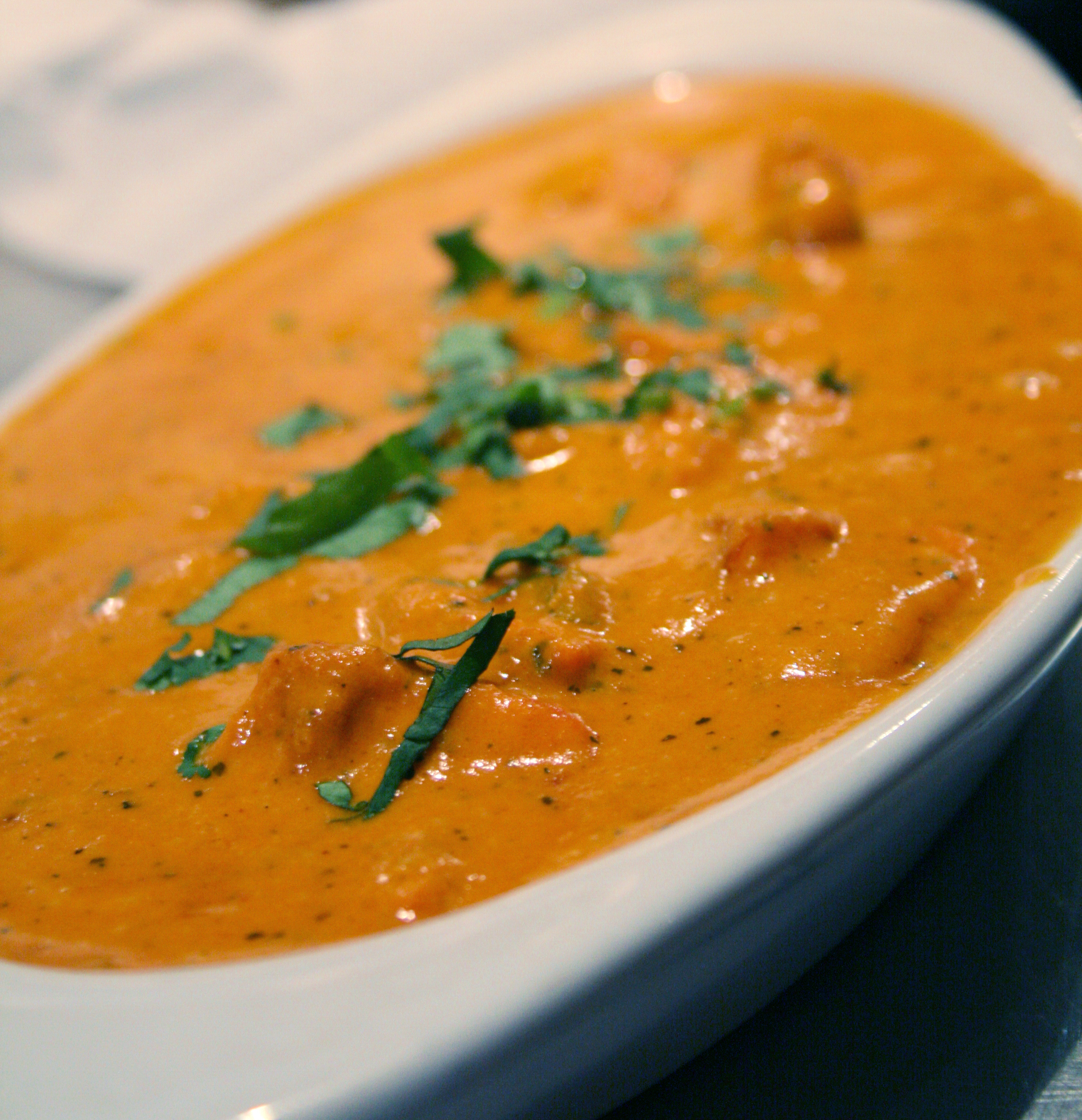
Chicken tikka masala

== See also ==
- Chicken lollipop
- Çiğ köfte
- North Indian cuisine
- Pakistani meat dishes

== Sources ==
- Iyer, Raghavan (2022). On the Curry Trail: Chasing the Flavor That Seduced the World. New York: Workman Publishing. ISBN 978-1523511211. OCLC 1374192575.
