= Bukhara (restaurant) =

Coordinates: 28.5971°N 77.1740°E

Restaurant information
- Owner: ITC
- Location: Delhi

Bukhara is a restaurant at The Luxury Collection ITC Maurya Hotel in New Delhi, India. It was established in 1977.

== Description ==
The restaurant serves cuisine in a clay ‘tandoor’ oven with a special emphasis on kebabs, which are served without cutlery. Signature dishes include the Sikandari Raan (Marinated Whole Leg of Spring Lamb), the Murgh Malai Kebab (Creamy Chicken Kebab), and the Dal Bukhara (the Restaurant's version of Dal Makhani; creamy black lentils with Butter). J.P. Singh is the Executive Chef at the restaurant, which has maintained its menu for the last 30 years.

=== Celebrity visits ===
Celebrity guests include former U.S. President Bill Clinton, Russian President Vladimir Putin and famous cricketer Sachin Tendulkar. In 2009, US Secretary of state Hillary Clinton, also visited the restaurant, the "Hillary Platter" later became part of the menu, in line with the "Presidential Platter" based on the non-vegetarian dishes ordered by Bill Clinton during his visit, and also the "Chelsea Platter" composed of vegetarian dishes ordered by Chelsea Clinton. President Donald Trump also visited the restaurant during his visit to India.
