= Murgh musallam =

Dish from the Indian subcontinent

Murgh Musallam
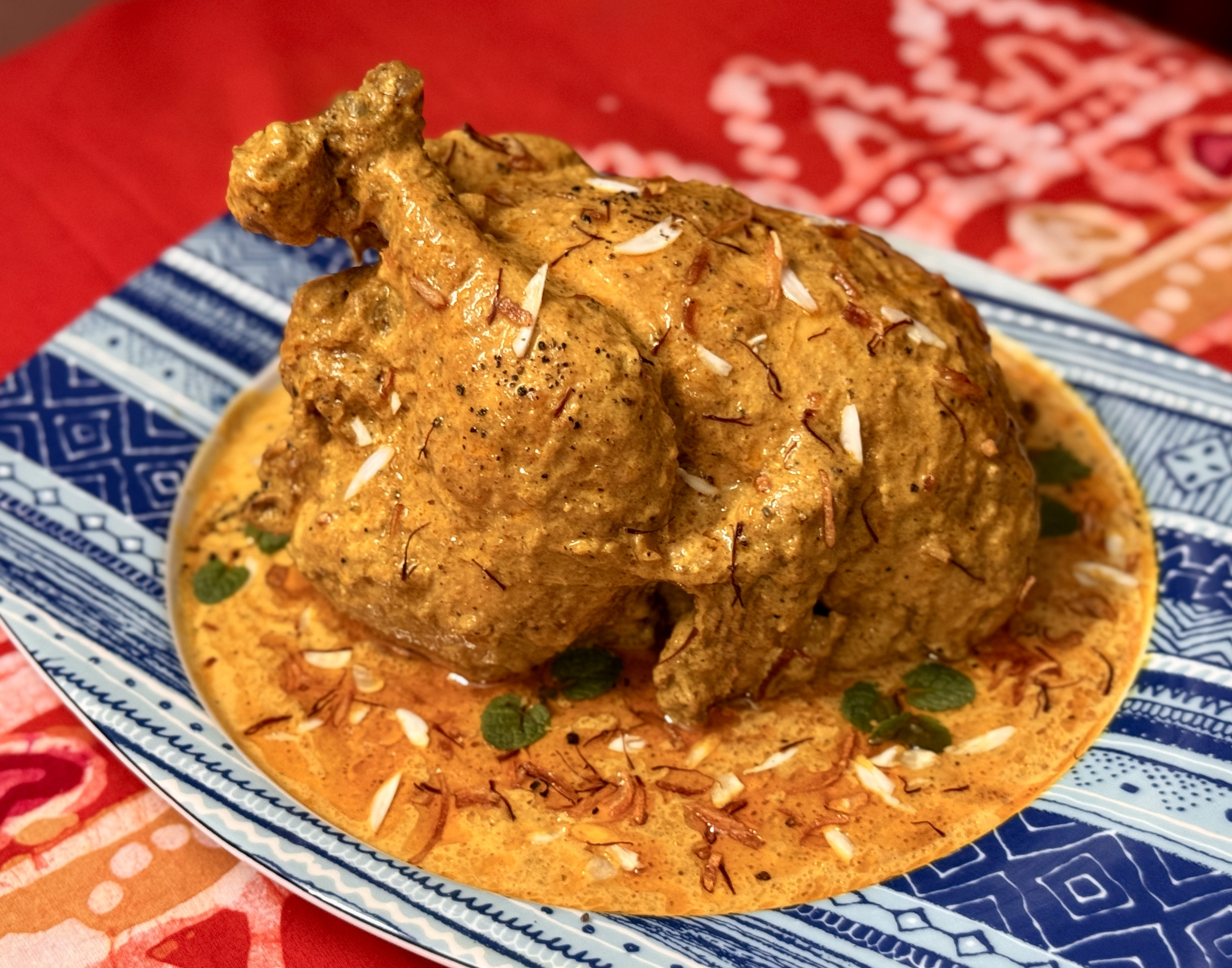
- Course: Main course
- Place of origin: Indian Subcontinent
- Associated cuisine: India, Bangladesh, Pakistan
- Serving temperature: Hot
- Main ingredients: Whole Chicken, minced meats, eggs, onion, ghee, ginger, garlic, saffron

Murgh musallam is a Mughlai dish originating from the Indian subcontinent. It consists of whole chicken marinated in a ginger-garlic paste, stuffed with boiled eggs and seasoned with spices like saffron, cinnamon, cloves, poppy seeds, cardamom and chilli. It is cooked dry or in sauce and decorated with almonds and vark.

== History ==
Murgh musallam literally means 'whole chicken‘ in Persian. The dish was popular among the royal Mughal families of Awadh, now the state of Uttar Pradesh in India. It also means 'well done'. Ibn Battuta described Murgh Musallam as a favourite dish of Muhammad bin Tughluq. The dish was also served in the Delhi Sultanate.

== See also ==
- List of chicken dishes
