= Phirni =

Indo-Persian rice pudding

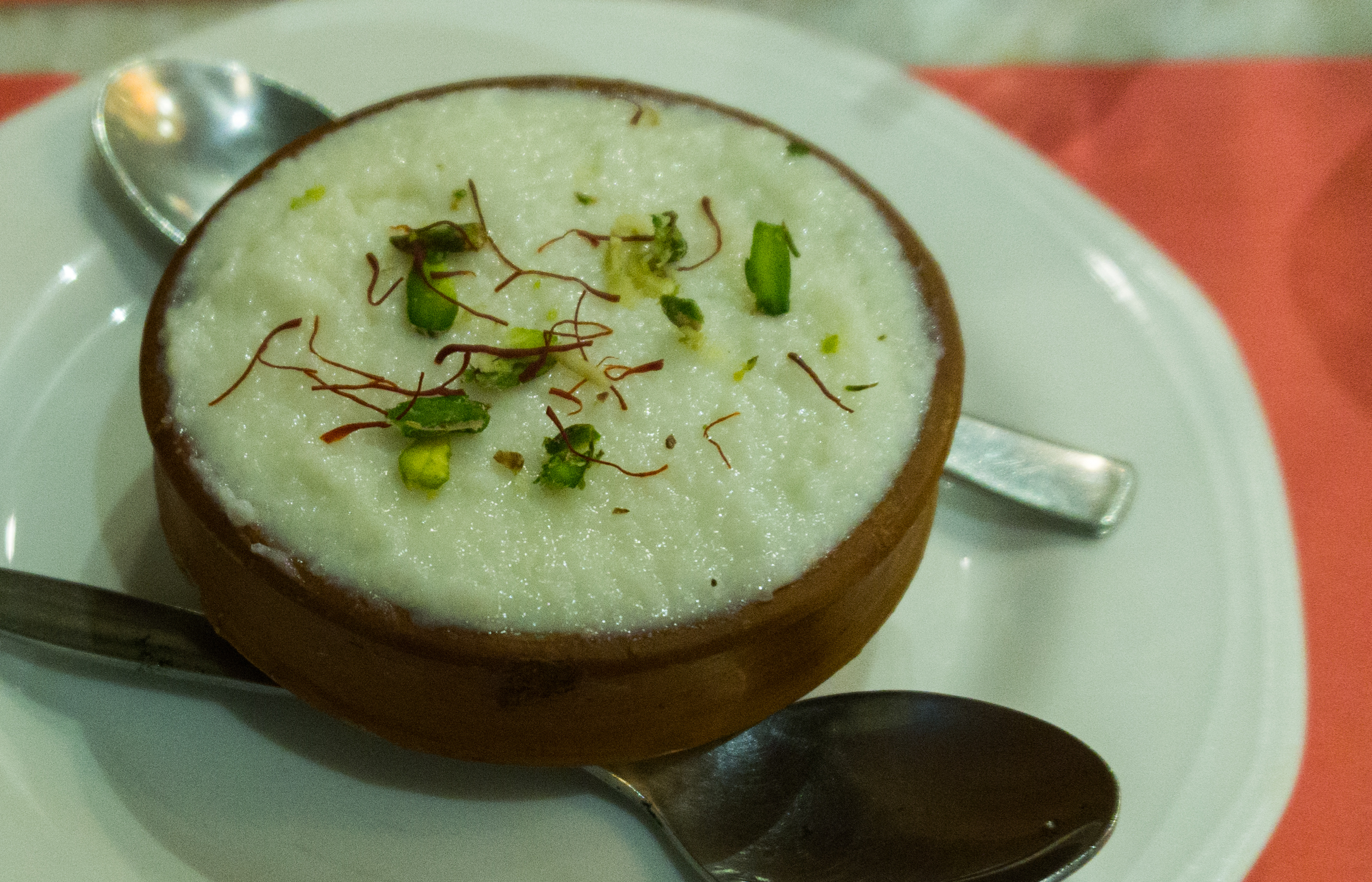
Phirni

Phirni or firni is a rice pudding dessert made with ground rice, rice flour or cornflour cooked in milk. It is eaten chilled and traditionally served in clay bowls called shikoras. It is flavored with aromatic spices such as cardamom, saffron, and rose water, and garnished with nuts like almonds and pistachios, along with rose petals, vark etc. Phirni and its variations can be found all over the Indian subcontinent, Middle East (muhallabia), Iran (fereni) and Afghanistan.

Phirni's origins in India date back to the Mughal era, where it was served as a royal dessert. The name phirni is derived from the Persian word firni, meaning "rice pudding". In Kashmir, it is referred to as firin and is usually flavored with rose water or kewra essence. In Afghanistan, firnee is usually made with cornstarch. Rose water-flavored and banana-flavored firnee are the two popular varieties.

It is often prepared for occasions and festivals such as Eid. TasteAltas featured phirni in the top 100 Best Desserts in the World and top 30 Rice Puddings in the World.

== Gallery ==
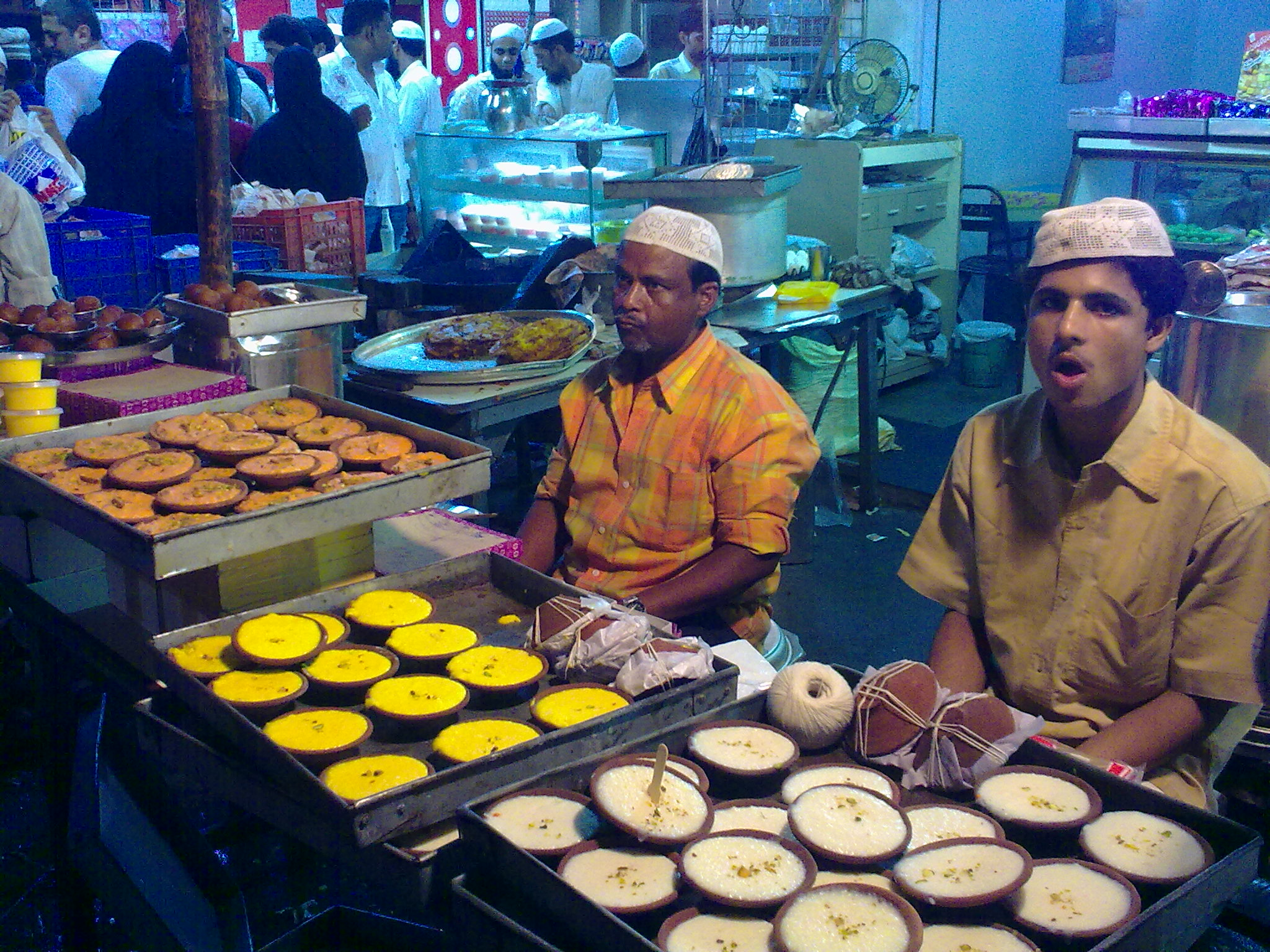
Phirni sellers in Mumbai

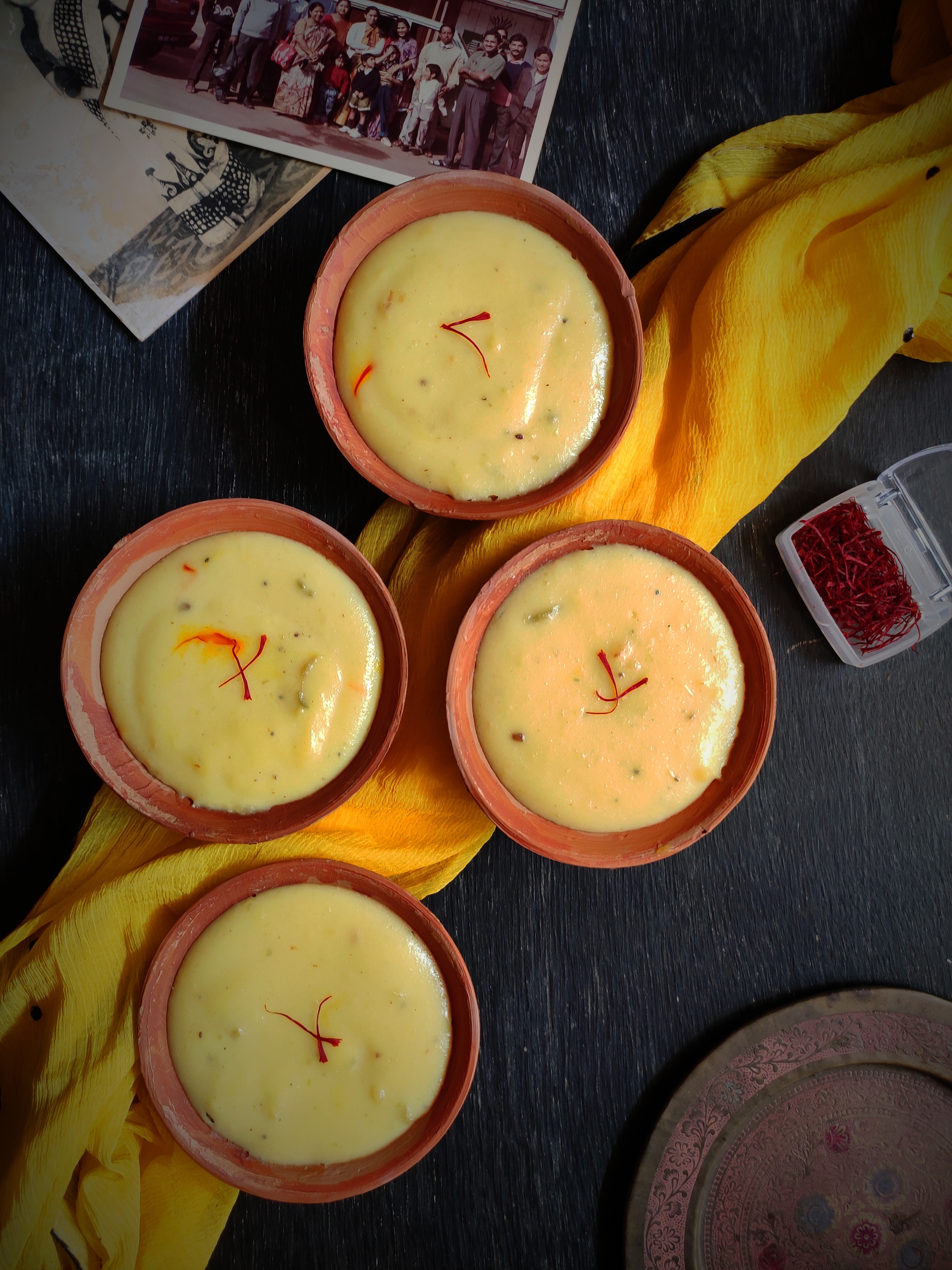
Phirni garnished with saffron

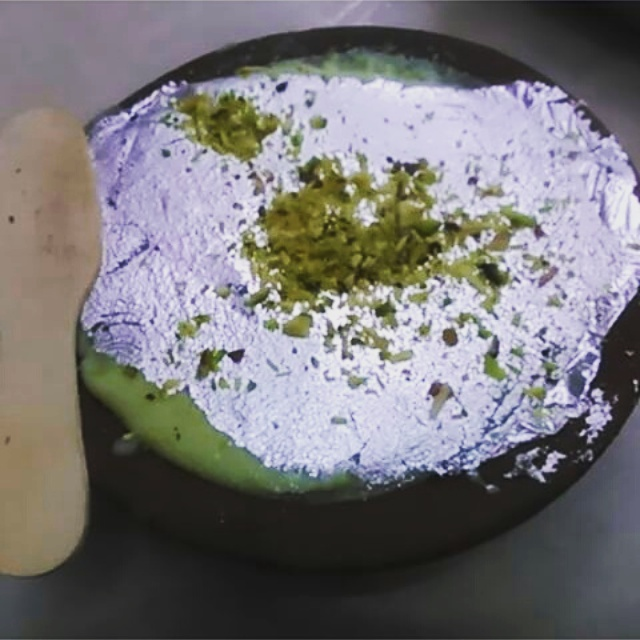
Phirni with vark

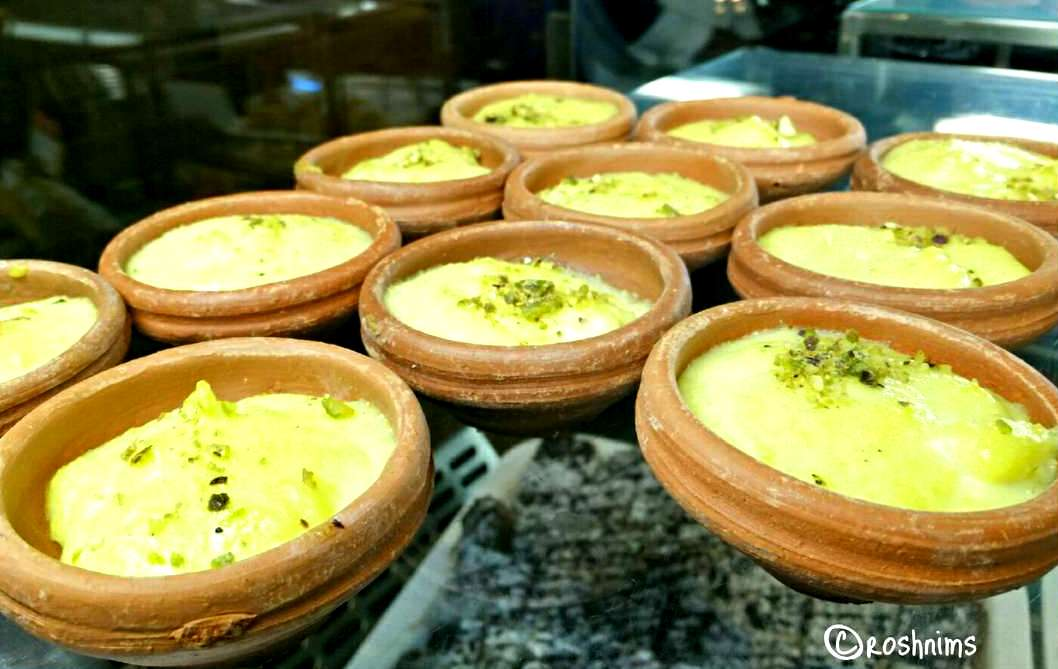
Phirni

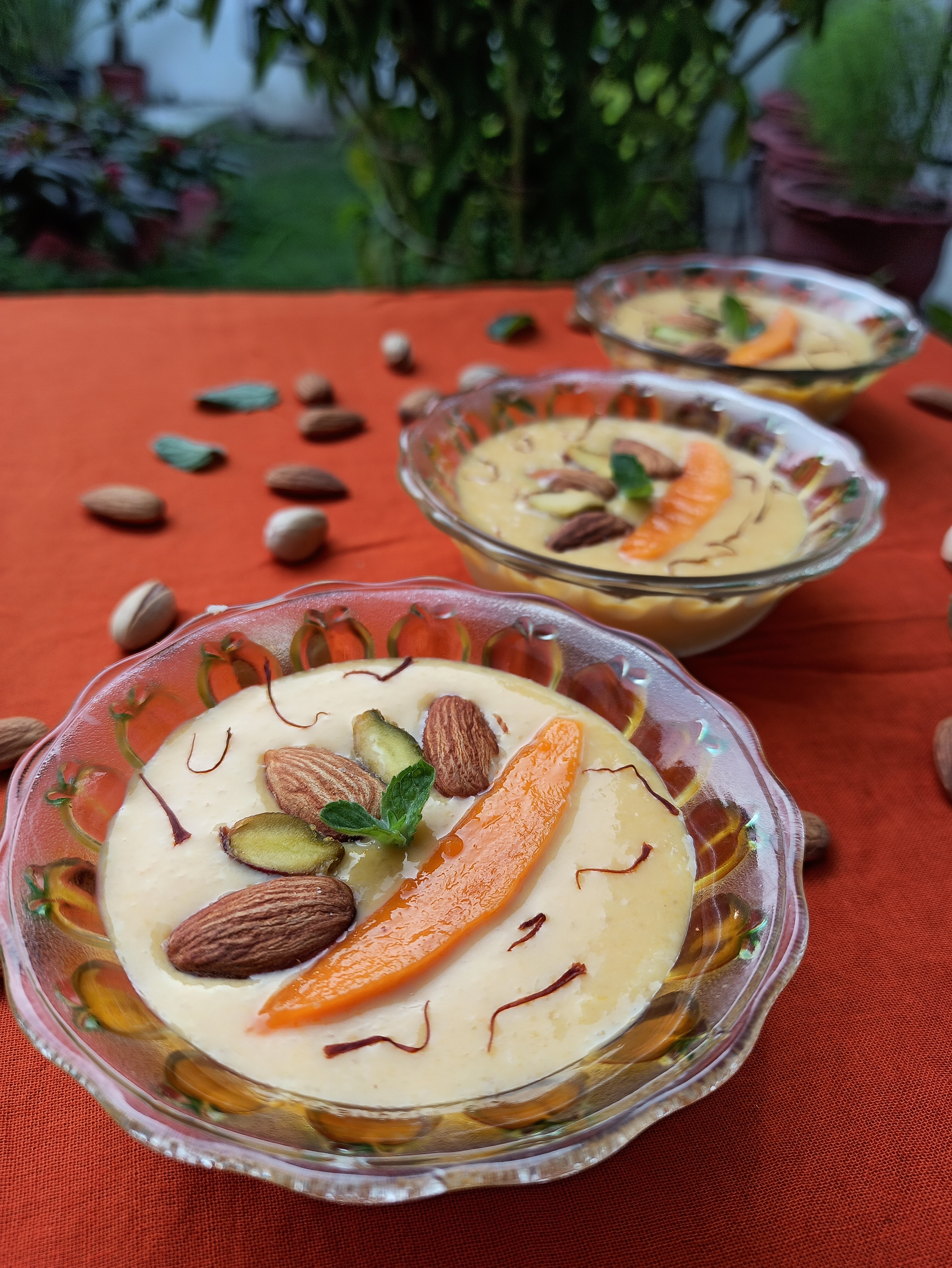
Mango phirni

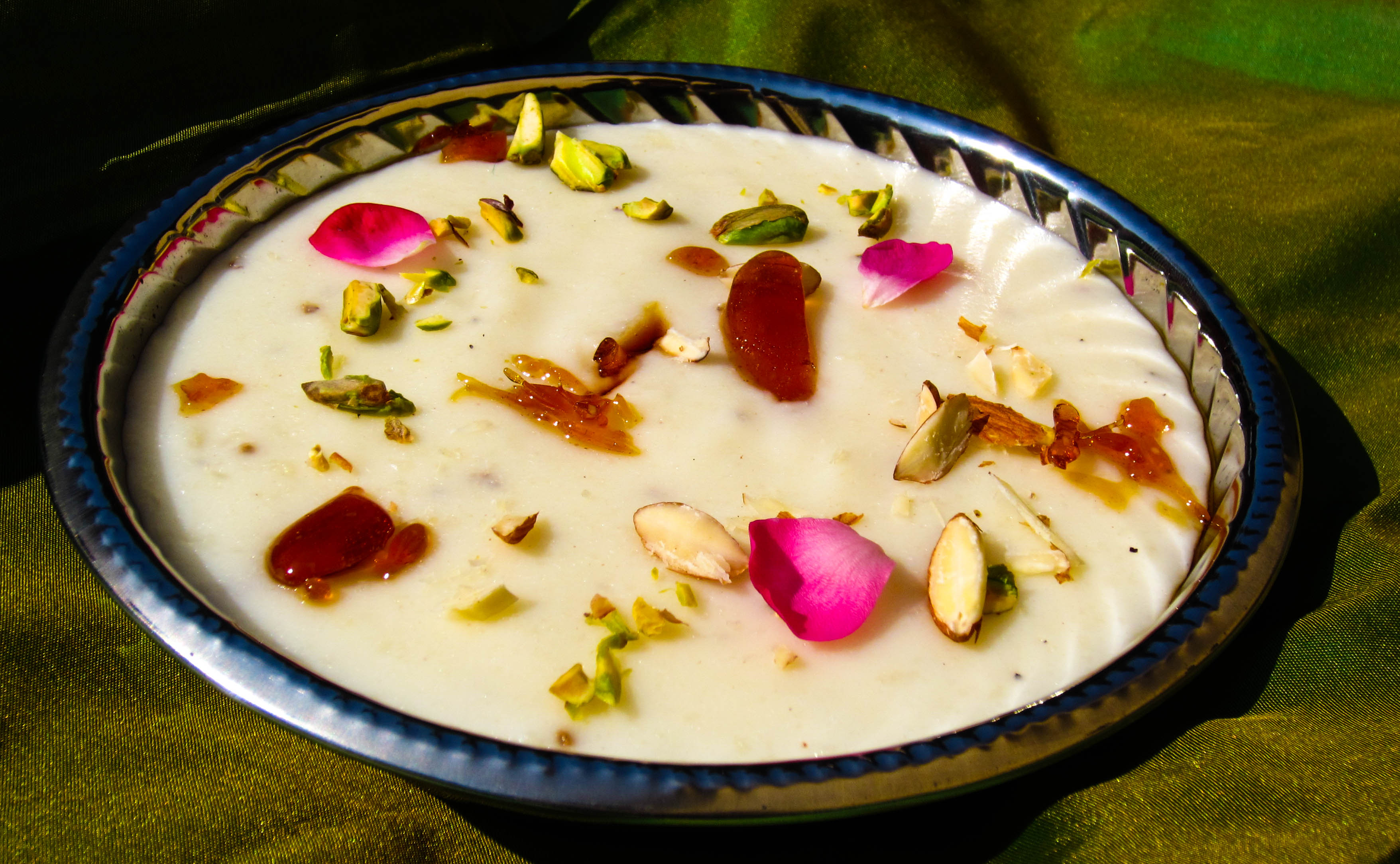
Phirni with rose petals

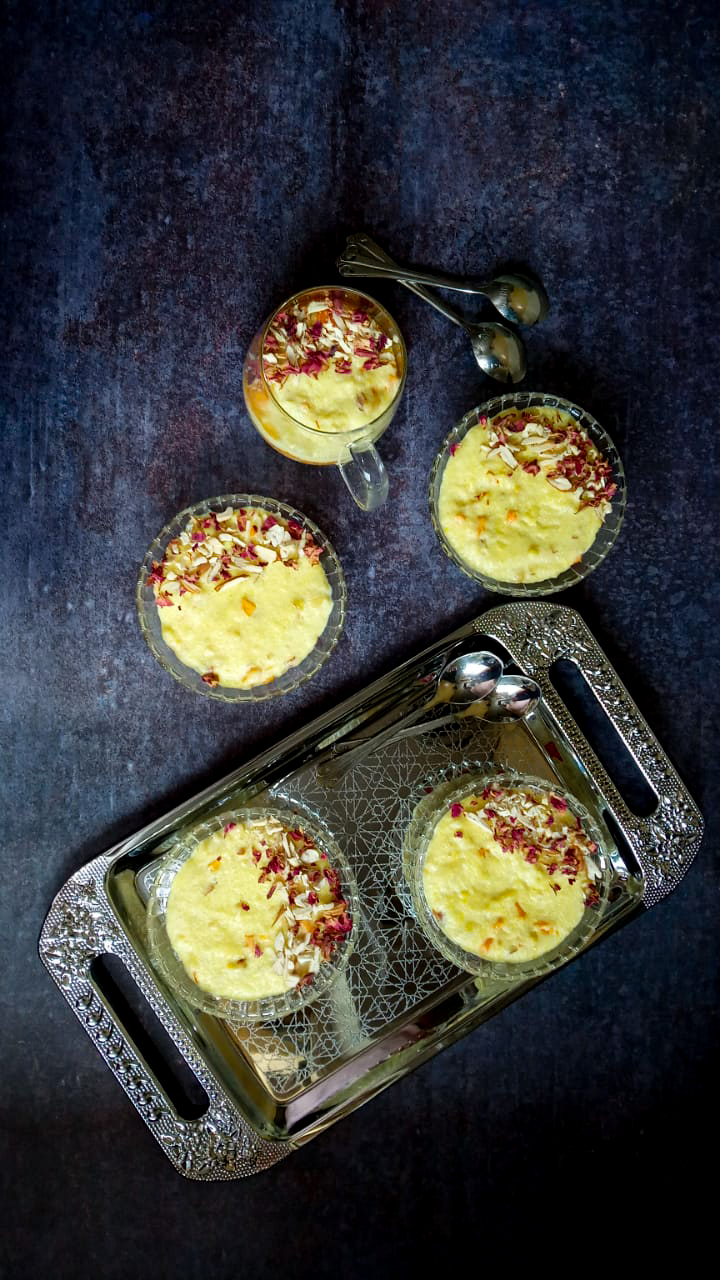
Phirni

== See also ==
- Porridge
- Kheer
- Shir Berenj
- Keşkül
- Blancmange

Media related to Phirni at Wikimedia Commons
