= Curry in the United Kingdom =

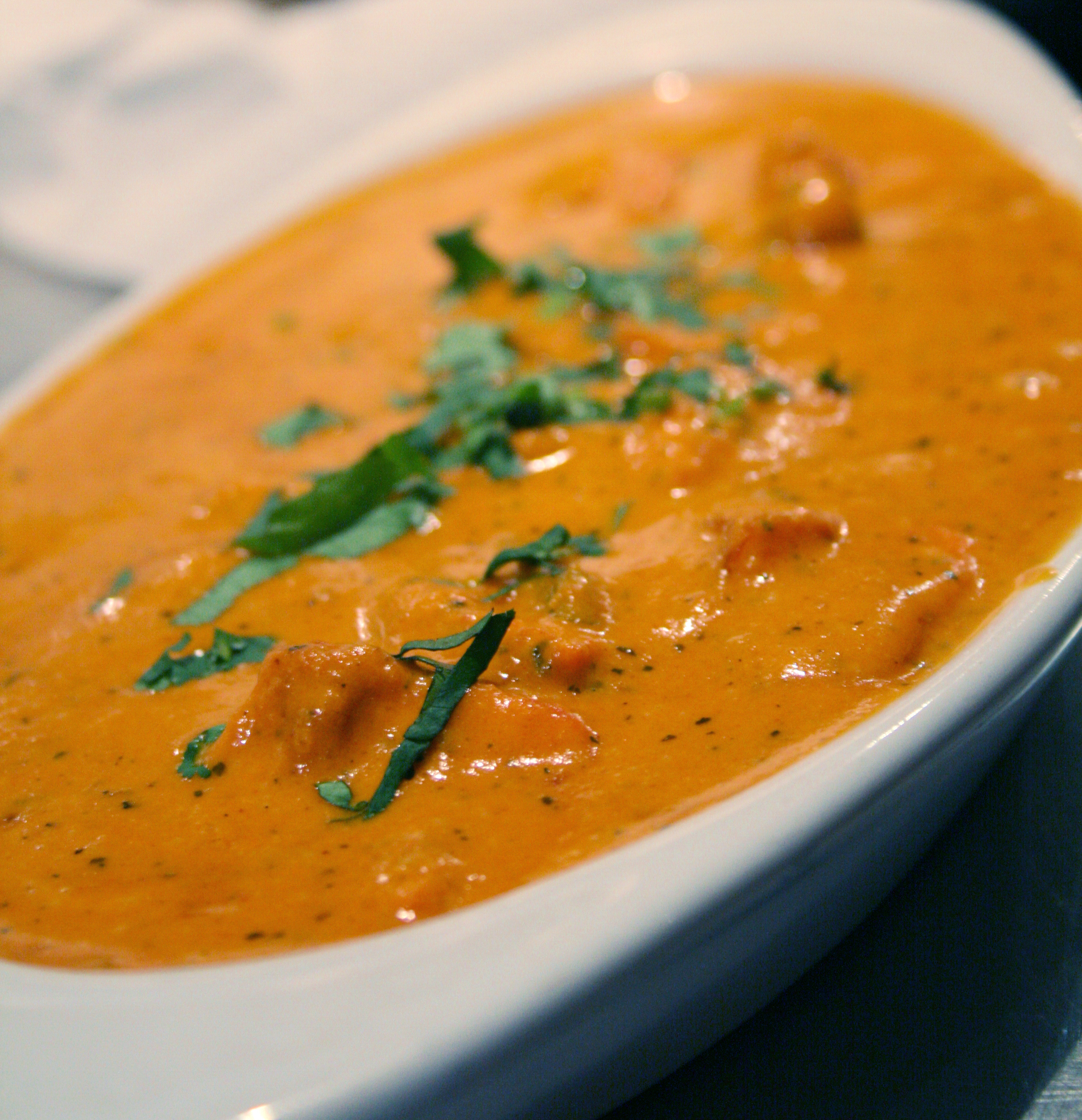
Chicken tikka masala has been called "a true British national dish".

UK curry timeline
| 1610 | Anglo-Indian cuisine begins |
| 1747 | First use of "currey" in England |
| 1784 | Curry powder |
| 1810 | First Indian restaurant |
| 1926 | Veeraswamy founded |
| 1961 | Instant dried curry |
| 1972 | Chicken tikka masala invented |
| 2001 | "A true British national dish" |
| 2010 | Curry kits |

Curry, a spicy dish derived from Indian cuisine by way of British Raj–era Anglo-Indian cuisine, is popular in the United Kingdom. Curry recipes have been printed in Britain since 1747, when Hannah Glasse gave a recipe for a chicken "currey the India way". Curry powder was first advertised in 1784. In the 19th century, many more recipes appeared in the popular cookery books of the time. Curries in Britain are widely described with Indian terms, not necessarily used for the same dishes or even known in India. For example, korma is a mild sauce with almond and coconut; Madras has a hot, slightly sour sauce; phall denotes an extra hot sauce, and pasanda means a mild sauce with cream and coconut milk. One type of curry, chicken tikka masala, has become widespread enough to be described as a national dish.

The first curry house opened in London in 1810. More followed early in the 20th century; Veeraswamy, founded in 1926, is the oldest surviving Indian restaurant in Britain. By the 1970s, over three-quarters of the Indian restaurants in the country were owned and run by people of Bangladeshi origin, mainly from the Sylhet area, though some restaurants are starting to offer South Indian or Punjabi cuisines. Several cities acquired areas known for their many curry restaurants, including Birmingham's Balti Triangle, London's Brick Lane and Drummond Street, and Manchester's Curry Mile. By 2016, the number of curry houses reached a peak of some 12,000, declining to around 8,000 by 2023. Causes of the decline include a shortage of Indian cooks, and the availability of high quality curry sauces and ready-made meals in supermarkets.

== Context ==
=== Anglo-Indian cuisine ===
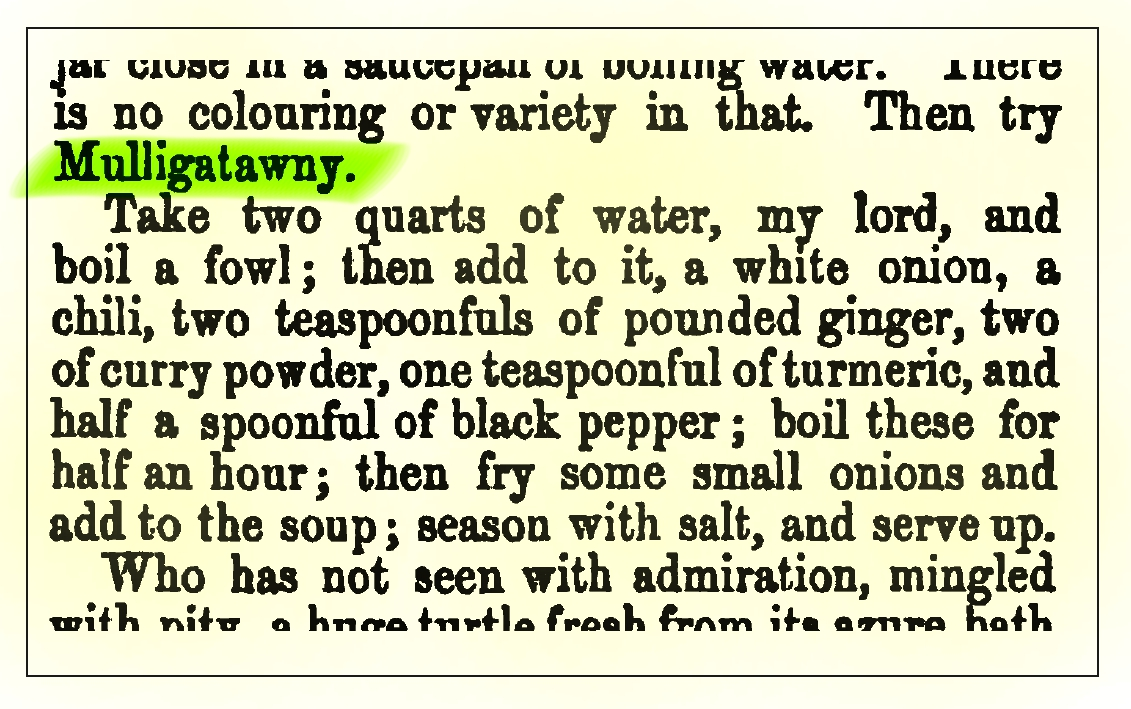
Recipe for Mulligatawny, an Anglo-Indian chicken soup with curry powder, in All the Year Round magazine, 1868

During the British presence in India, between 1612 and 1947, cooks began adapting Indian dishes for British palates to create Anglo-Indian cuisine. Anglo-Indian cooks created their version of "curry" by selecting elements of Indian dishes from all over British India. The historian of food Lizzie Collingham describes their taste as "eclectic", "pan-Indian", "lacking sophistication", and forming a "coherent repertoire". She notes especially their "passion for garnishes", which they borrowed from multiple traditions: chopped hard-boiled eggs from Persian cuisine; lemon pickles from Punjab; pappadoms, dried coconut] and raw onions from South India; and their own additions like pieces of fried bacon. The cuisine soon began to appear in Britain as Anglo-Indians returned home.

Ingredients of 3 curry powders in Henrietta Hervey's Anglo-Indian Cooking at Home (1895)
| Ingredient | Madras | Bombay | Bengal |
|---|---|---|---|
| Coriander | ✓ | ✓ | ✓ |
| Chilli | ✓ | ✓ | ✓ |
| Black pepper | ✓ | ✓ | ✓ |
| Cumin | ✓ | ✓ | |
| Mustard seed | ✓ | ✓ | |
| Turmeric | | ✓ | ✓ |
| Fenugreek | | ✓ | ✓ |
| Ginger | | | ✓ |
| Saffron | ✓ | | |

In her 1895 book Anglo-Indian Cooking at Home, Henrietta Hervey described how to make three curry powders, which she called "Madras", "Bombay", and "Bengal". The "Madras" powder recipe called for coriander, saffron, chilli, mustard seed, pepper, and cumin, among other ingredients. The "Bombay" recipe used coriander, cumin, turmeric, mustard seed, pepper, chillies, and a little fenugreek. The "Bengal" mixture consisted mainly of coriander, turmeric, fenugreek, ginger, black pepper, and chilli. For cooks in England, Hervey suggested the commercial Crosse & Blackwell mixture, which she called "the nearest approach to the real article", but "a pis aller [a desperate measure] at the best". Hervey's recipe for an Anglo-Indian favourite for a British audience, "Country Captain" chicken curry, consisted of a chicken cut into joints, dusted with curry powder, and fried with onions.

=== Becoming part of English cooking ===
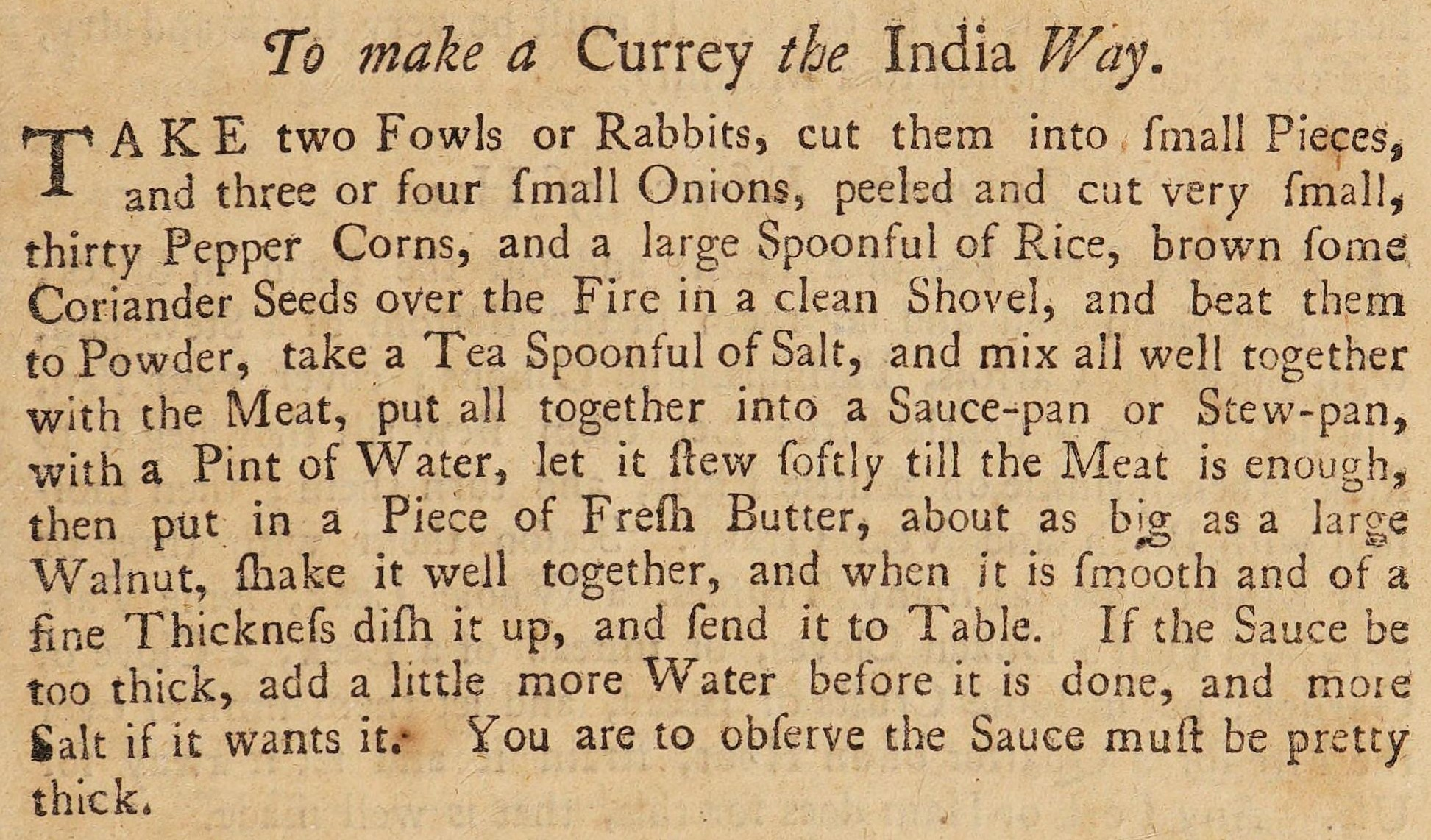
Hannah Glasse's receipt To make a Currey the India Way from The Art of Cookery Made Plain and Easy, 1748 edition. Later editions used more spices.

The first curry recipe in Britain was published in The Art of Cookery made Plain and Easy by Hannah Glasse in 1747. The first edition of her book used only black pepper and coriander seeds for seasoning of "currey". The cookery writer Clarissa Dickson Wright calls Glasse's curry a "famous recipe" and comments that she was "a bit sceptical" of this recipe, as it had few of the expected spices, but was "pleasantly surprised by the end result" which had "a very good and interesting flavour". Later editions added cream, lemons, and spices such as ginger and turmeric.

London eating places such as coffee houses began to add curry to their repertoires in 1773, with the arrival of Indian Lascar shipping crews, including their cooks, at London's East India Docks. The first commercially available curry powder in England was advertised by Sorlie's Perfumery Warehouse on Piccadilly in 1784.

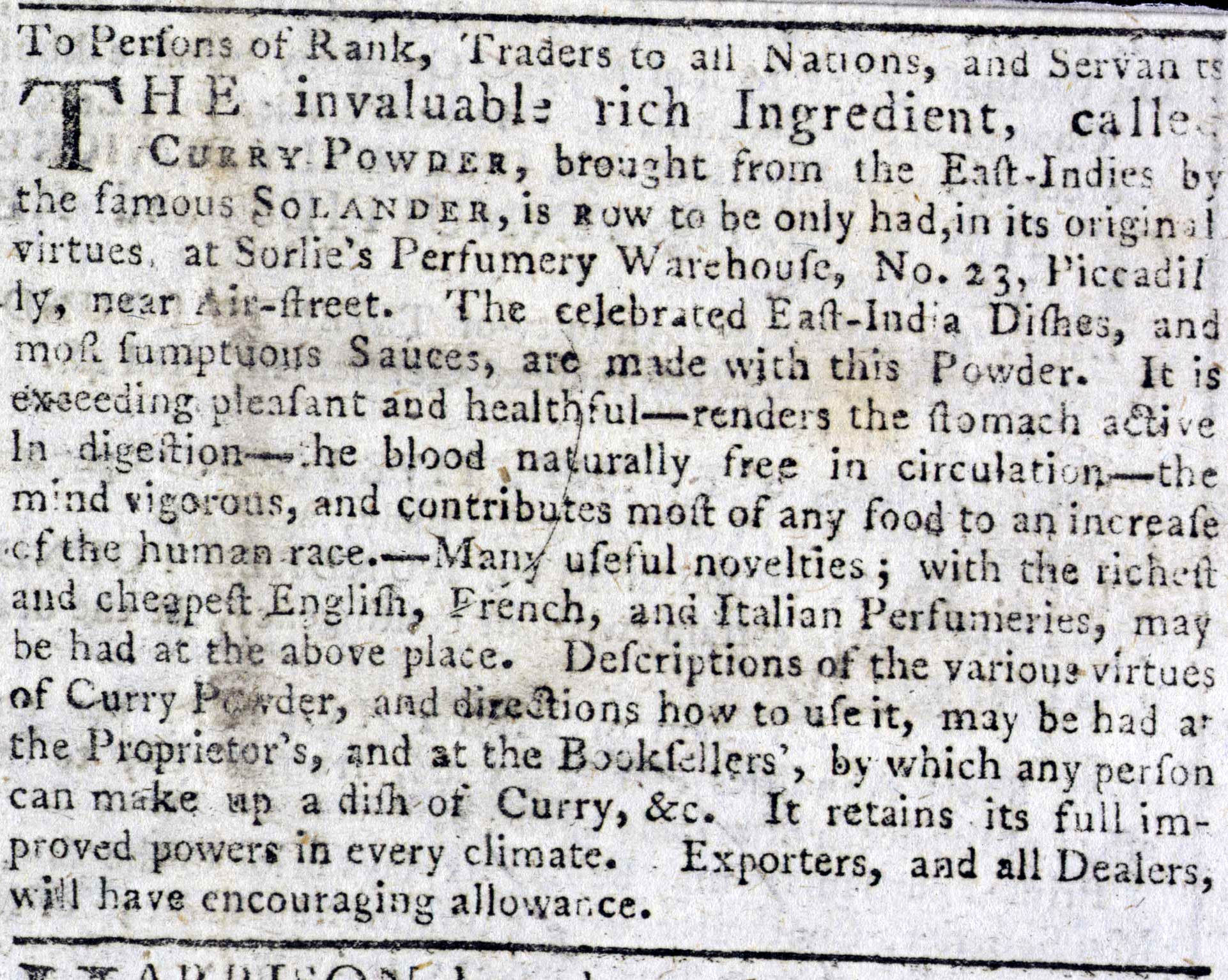
The earliest advertisement for curry powder, by Sorlie's Perfumery Warehouse, Piccadilly, London, 1784

Many curry recipes appeared in 19th century cookery books. Eliza Acton's 1845 Modern Cookery for Private Families offered recipes for curried sweetbreads and curried macaroni, merging Indian and European foods into standard English cooking. Her recipe for curry powder consisted of turmeric, coriander, cumin, fenugreek, and cayenne; she recommended Corbyn's of High Holborn as a source of spices. The 1861 edition of Mrs Beeton's Book of Household Management gave a recipe for curry powder containing coriander, turmeric, cinnamon, cayenne, mustard, ginger, allspice and fenugreek; although she notes that it is more economical to purchase the powder at "any respectable shop". By 1895, curry was included in Dainty Dishes for Slender Incomes, aimed at the poorer classes.

=== Popular dish ===
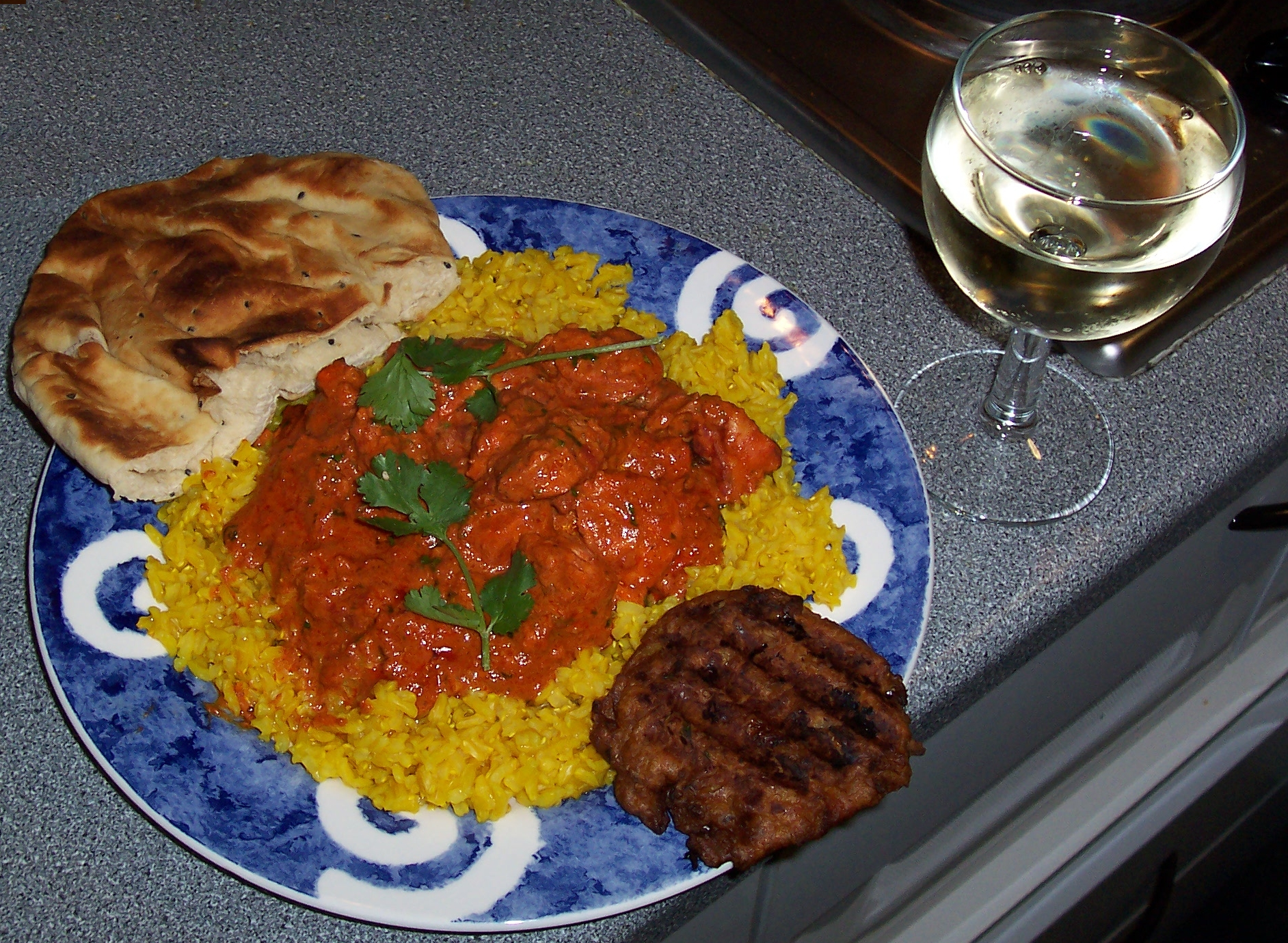
A British curry served with naan bread, onion bhaji, and rice

By the start of the 21st century, curry was extremely popular in the United Kingdom, with a curry house in nearly every town. In 2016 there were some 12,000 curry houses in the United Kingdom, employing 100,000 people with annual combined sales of approximately £4.2 billion. This had declined to some 8,000 restaurants by 2023, partly because it was difficult to find Indian cooks, but the easy availability of curry sauces in supermarkets, and of ready-made meals, likely contributed to the decline. Householders can order takeaways from restaurants to eat at home. Alternatively, they can buy inexpensive curry kits, containing a packet of whole spices, a packet of spice paste, and a pouch of sauce, from a supermarket, enabling them to prepare a curry of "exceptional" quality quickly at home. "The Spice Tailor" for example started to produce its curry kits in 2010.

Curry has become an integral part of British cuisine, so much so that, by the start of the 21st century, the Foreign Secretary Robin Cook called chicken tikka masala "a true British national dish" in a speech to parliament. The sociologist Bob Ashley remarked in 2004 that a National Trust café, whose manager claimed "We're not allowed to do foreign food ... I can't do lasagne or anything like that", in fact served curry, because "seemingly curry is English". In a survey in 2011, jalfrezi was rated the most popular dish in British Indian restaurants, having taken over from chicken tikka masala. According to the chef Rick Stein in 2013, a curry had broadened its meaning in Britain to "any food from the Indian sub-continent", while Ameer Kotecha in The Spectator writes that the British usage of 'curry' specifically means "the British reinvention of Indian cuisine", including components of the meal like papadams, mint sauce, and mango chutney which "would be hard to find on the subcontinent."

Evolution of chicken tikka masala. Chicken tikka was created in Mughal India using Persian marinading of meat in yoghurt and Central Asian tandoor roasting with Indian spices. In 20th century Britain, a sauce was added to meet the British liking for gravy with meat. The dish has evolved further to a taco filling in the US, and to a pizza topping in India.

=== Accompaniments ===
Curry is accompanied by side dishes such as Indian flatbreads including naan, fried snacks such as bhajis, pakoras, and samosas used as starters, plain or spiced rice, dal, a selection of chutneys, and cooling raitas.

Collingham remarks that "another very British practice" is to drink beer with a curry. She notes that as early as 1810, Thomas Williamson wrote in The East India vade-mecum that "nothing can be more gratifying ... after eating curry" than a glass of beer. In the mid-20th century, people would buy a curry after leaving the pub of an evening. Bangladeshi restaurant owners were often reluctant to sell alcohol, believing that to be against their Muslim faith. Once Indian restaurants had acquired licences to sell alcohol, Collingham comments, "a few beers, a hot vindaloo and chips" became a popular combination. A study gave the practice some prominence by purporting to link the consumption of curry spices with increased alcohol absorption and a reduced risk of stomach ulcers when the two were consumed together.

== Curry houses ==
=== 19th century ===
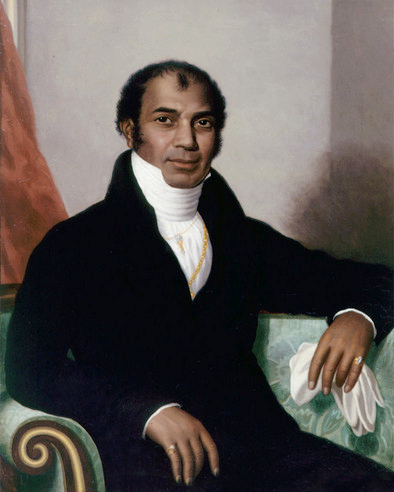
Dean Mahomed founded the first Indian curry house in England, the Hindoostane Dinner and Hooka Smoking Club, in 1810.

In 1810, the entrepreneur Dean Mahomed, from the Bengal Presidency, opened the first Indian curry house in England: the Hindoostane Dinner and Hooka Smoking Club, later called the Hindoostane Coffee House, in London's Portman Square. Dishes could be purchased there for consumption at home, making it in addition England's first takeaway restaurant. It closed in 1833.

=== Early 20th century ===
In 1911, the Salut-e-Hind restaurant opened in London's Holborn district. Another early Indian restaurant was the Shafi on London's Gerrard Street, founded in 1920; it became a meeting-place for Indians in Britain, including students and visiting politicians such as Muhammad Ali Jinnah alongside English returnees from India. In the 1920s, the Bahadur brothers opened the Kohinoor restaurant on London's Roper Street; it flourished, enabling the brothers to open further restaurants in Brighton, Cambridge, Manchester, Northampton, and Oxford in the 1920s and 1930s.

Veeraswamy & Co. had been selling Nizam brand Indian foods across England since 1896. The Veeraswamy restaurant in London's Regent Street was founded in 1926; it is the oldest surviving Indian restaurant in Britain. These pre-war restaurants served Anglo-Indian cuisine using curry powder, without the variety of spicing characteristic of Indian cuisine.

=== Post-war ===
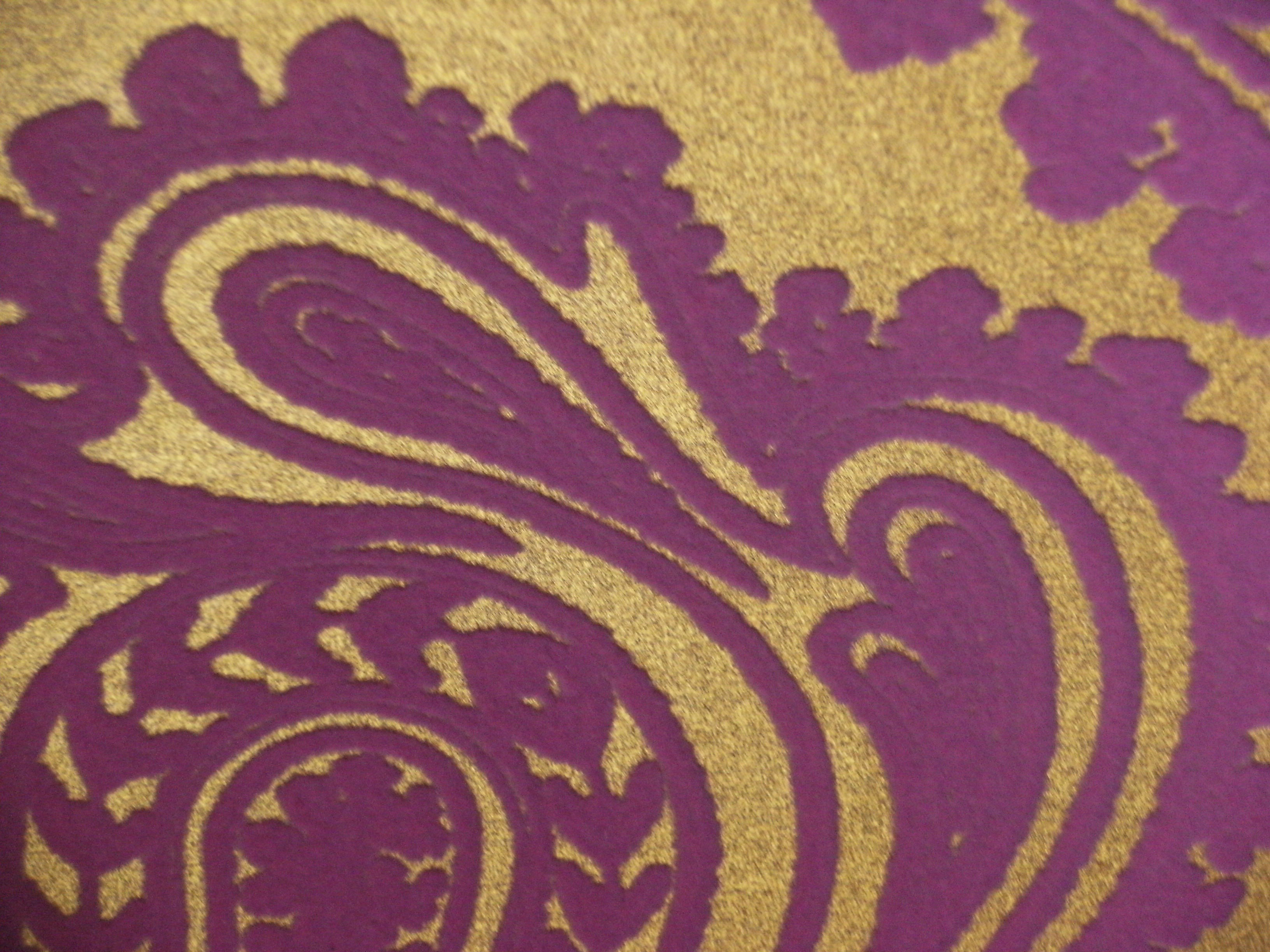
Post-war Indian restaurants were commonly decorated with red flock wallpaper.

For Queen Elizabeth II's coronation in 1953, the florist Constance Spry and the cookery instructor Rosemary Hume invented a curried chicken salad which they called coronation chicken. It called for pan-roasted chicken to be combined with a sauce using Madras curry powder and mayonnaise.

In 1961, the British company Batchelors launched Vesta instant dried curry, a product that enabled people to make a quick curry at home. It became well-known, even aspirational. The product was heavily advertised through to the 1980s as a tasty full meal that could be ready in 20 minutes. The resulting curry was later described in The Guardian as "suspiciously shiny brown goo". In 1982, the humorous novelist Sue Townsend made her schoolboy character Adrian Mole eat Vesta, only to be mocked for it by an Indian neighbour.

Desi pubs, managed by a landlord of Indian origin and serving Indian food including curries, originated during the 1960s. They have been cited as examples of cultural integration between Asian and British communities. By 2016, there were at least 50 Desi pubs in the Black Country of the West Midlands alone.

Until the early 1970s, more than three-quarters of Indian restaurants in Britain were owned and run by migrants from East Pakistan, which became Bangladesh in 1971. British Bangladeshi restaurateurs overwhelmingly came from the northeastern division of Sylhet. The restaurants in towns all across Britain were "almost invariably" decorated with red flock wallpaper, not to mention what Curry Magazine described as "ornamental hardboard Indian arches, and red or orange lighting in Eastern lampshades". While their decor was mocked by critics, the food was widely enjoyed, being at once familiar and exotic. As late as 1998, as many as 85% of curry restaurants in the United Kingdom were British Bangladeshi, but by 2003 this figure had declined to just over 65%.

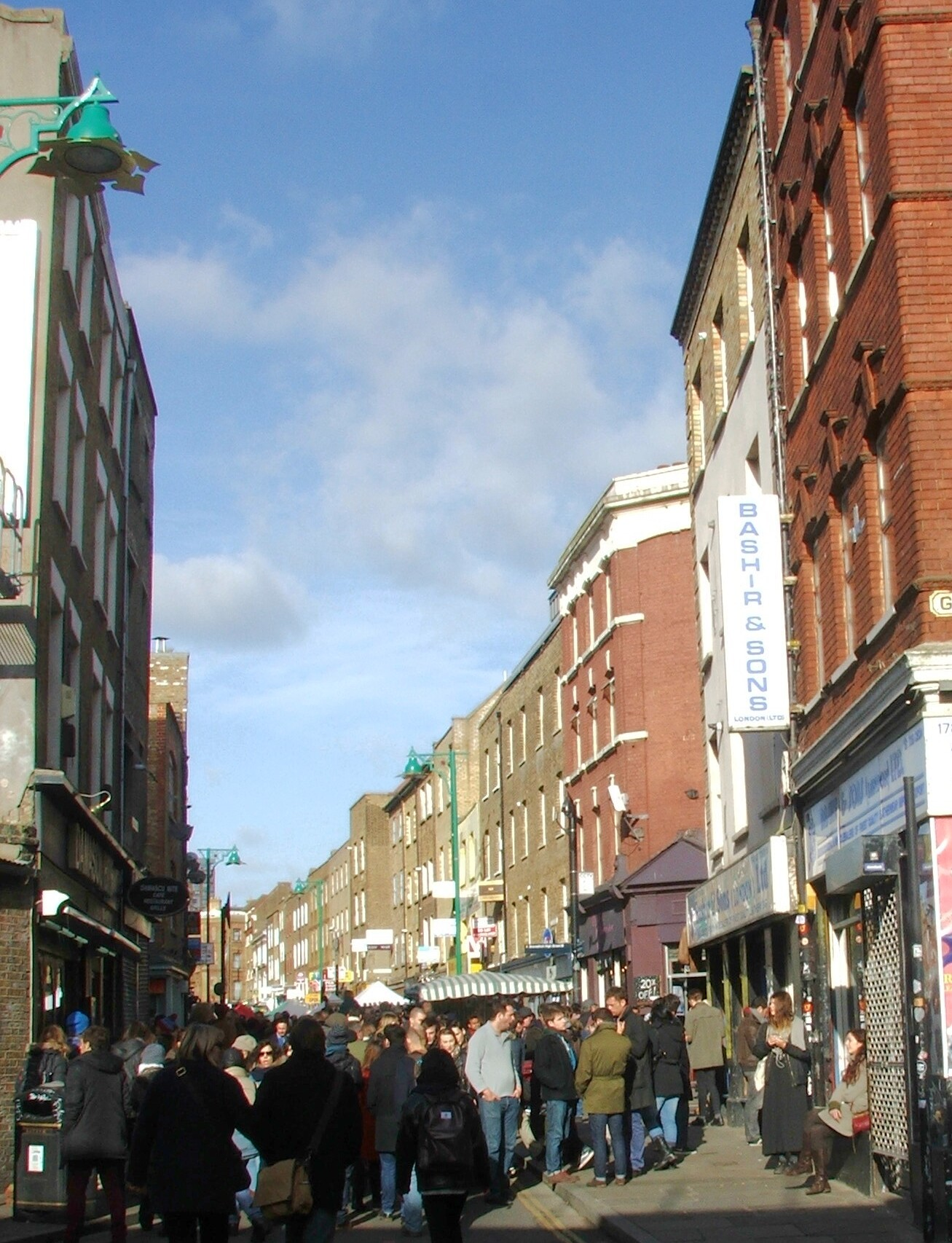
Brick Lane on a busy day in 2015 with Bangladeshi restaurants, shops, and food stalls

In the 1980s, Bradford, in economic decline with the loss of its textile industry, started to advertise itself with a "curry trail" in "Flavours of Asia" brochures; it had over 50 curry houses at that time, rising to more than 200 by 2008. In 1982, the BBC published a practical guide to cooking curries by the Indian cook Madhur Jaffrey; at that time, she avoided the word "curry", feeling that the umbrella term for many different dishes and regional styles was "degrading to India's great cuisine", but she eventually accepted the category in her later writings.

In Birmingham, the "Balti Triangle" near Balsall Heath and Sparkhill was home to over 30 Balti curry houses at the start of the 21st century, but by 2023 this had declined to just 4, while dessert shops and takeaways had increased. Adil's restaurant there, founded in 1977, and which may have invented the Balti curry, closed in 2022 when its founder retired.

Brick Lane, in London's East End became famous for its many Bangladeshi cuisine curry houses, with a curry festival that was for a while run annually. The area became known as 'Banglatown', but the restaurants and Bangladeshi shops declined sharply during the COVID-19 pandemic.

=== 21st century ===
In Glasgow, there are more restaurants of Punjabi origin than any other. One of the oldest, Shish Mahal restaurant on Glasgow's Park Road, claims to have invented chicken tikka masala in 1972.

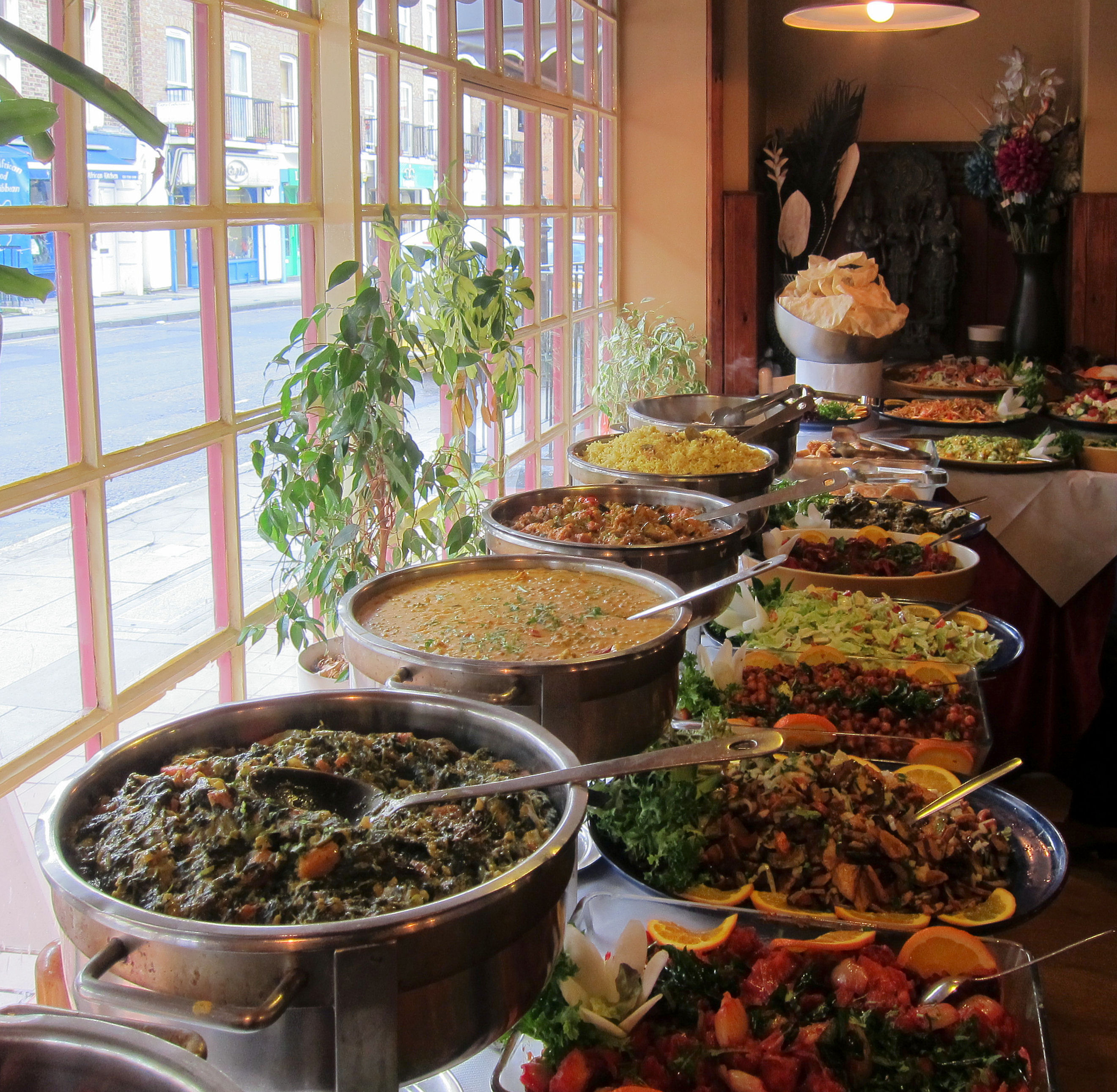
South Indian vegetarian lunch buffet at the oldest curry house in Drummond Street, Diwana Bhel Poori House, founded in 1971

Drummond Street, near London's Euston Station, houses many South Indian restaurants with a quite different cuisine from the Bangladeshi. The oldest, the Diwana Bhel Poori House, was founded in 1971, and may well be Britain's oldest South Indian vegetarian restaurant.

In the early 2010s the popularity of the curry house saw a decline. This has been attributed to the sale of curries in generic restaurants, increased home cooking of curries with ingredients readily available in supermarkets, and Britain's 2008 immigration restrictions making it hard to find low-wage chefs. As of 2015, curry houses accounted for a fifth of the restaurant business in the United Kingdom. Restaurant styles too are changing; for example, since 2014, Bundobust has opened vegetarian Gujarati street food restaurants in several cities.

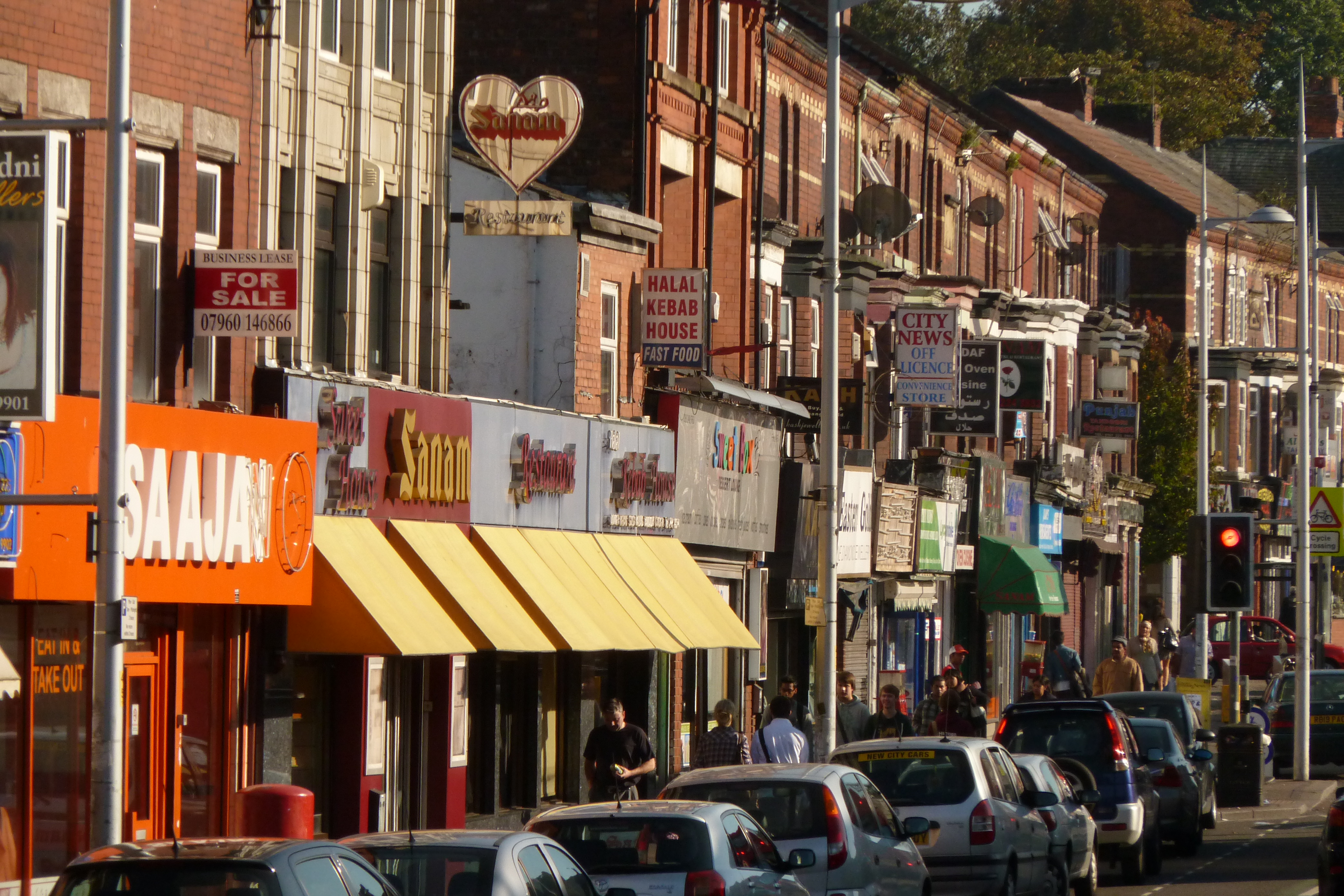
A diverse mix of South Asian restaurants along Manchester's Curry Mile in 2010

In 2014, Manchester's Curry Mile on Wilmslow Road in its Rusholme district housed over 70 Indian restaurants, the largest number in any district in the country. Cuisines available on the street by 2020 included North Indian, Pakistani (Lahori, Mughlai), Sri Lankan, Bangladeshi, and Nepalese.

Birmingham, Bradford, Glasgow, Leicester, and West London have each spent a year in the 21st century as "UK Curry Capital" after national votes.

Regardless of the ethnic origin of a restaurant's ownership, the menu is influenced by wider South Asian cuisine, and sometimes cuisines from further afield, such as Persian dishes. Better quality restaurants make up new sauces on a daily basis, using fresh ingredients wherever possible and grinding their own spices. More modest establishments may resort to frozen or dried ingredients and pre-packaged spice mixtures. At the top end, two Indian restaurants in London, Tamarind (opened 1995) and Zaika (opened 1999) gained Michelin stars for the quality of their cooking in 2001.

In Wales, St Helen's Road, Swansea has been home to multiple curry houses since 1970, following the arrival of Bangladeshi immigrants from the 1950s onwards. In Northern Ireland, two restaurants in the centre of Derry, the Mekong with its Vietnamese/Thai cuisine and the Siam Thai with its Thai cuisine, have both been placed in the Asian Catering Federation's list of the UK's "Top 100 Curry Restaurants".

== Dishes ==
=== Range of strengths ===
Curries in Britain are derived and named partly from India and partly from invention in local Indian restaurants. They vary from mildly-spiced to extremely hot, with names that are often unknown in India.

Range of strengths of British curries
| Strength | Example | Place of origin | Description |
|---|---|---|---|
| Mild | Korma | Mughal court, North India | Mild, creamy; may have almond, coconut, or fruit |
| Medium | Madras | Anglo-Indian cuisine in British Raj, then British Bangladeshi restaurants | Red, spicy with chili powder |
| Hot | Vindaloo | Portuguese Carne de vinha d'alhos (pork with wine vinegar and garlic) | Very spicy with chili peppers, vinegar, and potatoes (Note: The addition of potatoes may be from confusion of 'Vindaloo' with Hindi आलू āloo, potato.) |
| Extreme | Phall | British Bangladeshi, Birmingham | High-strength chili pepper e.g. scotch bonnet, habanero |

=== Named types ===
There are many named types of curry in British Indian restaurants. These include:

Named British curries
| Name | Origin | Description |
|---|---|---|
| Balti | Birmingham | Traditionally cooked and served in a balti pot |
| Bhuna | Bengal | medium, thick sauce, with some vegetables. From Bengal. |
| Biryani | Mughal court | spiced rice and meat cooked together and usually served with vegetable curry sauce. |
| Dhansak | Adapted from Gujarat's Parsi cuisine | Meat or prawns with lentils and vegetables; in UK often with pineapple. |
| Dopiaza | Mughal court | medium curry containing onions both boiled and fried. |
| Jalfrezi | Anglo-Indian | onion, green chili and a thick sauce. |
| Kofta | Mughal court, from Arab cuisine | dishes containing meatballs, or sometimes fish or vegetables. |
| Korma | British, adapted from Anglo-Indian, in turn adapted from Mughal cuisine | mild, yellow in colour, with ground almonds. |
| Madras | British Bangladeshi | "the standard hot, slightly sour curry at the Indian restaurant." |
| Pasanda | Mughal court | a mild curry sauce made with cream, coconut milk, and almonds or cashews, served with lamb, chicken, or king prawns. |
| Pathia | British, name only from Parsi fish stew | a hot curry, generally similar to a "Madras" with the addition of lemon juice and tomato purée. |
| Phaal | British Bangladeshi | "the hottest curry the restaurants can make. There is nothing like it in India — it is pure invention." |
| Roghan josh | Mughal court, and then Kashmir | a medium-spicy curry, usually of lamb/beef with a deep red sauce containing tomatoes and paprika. |
| Sambar | South India | medium-heat, sour curry made with lentils and tamarind. |
| Tandoori, Tikka | West, South, and Central Asia, via Mughal court | dry pieces of tandoori chicken and chicken tikka, spiced and cooked in the tandoor, a cylindrical clay oven. |
| Tikka masala | British | Tikka meat, in cream and tomato sauce |
| Vindaloo | British; adapted from Portuguese Goan | generally regarded as the classic "hot" restaurant curry. |

== See also ==
- The British Curry Awards
- The Curry Club

== Sources ==
- Ashley, Bob (2004). Food and Cultural Studies. Psychology Press. ISBN 978-0-415-27038-0.
- Basu, Shrabani (2003). Curry: The Story of the Nation's Favourite Dish. Stroud, Gloucestershire: Sutton Publishing. ISBN 978-0750933742.
- Chapman, Pat (1988). Favourite Restaurant Curries. London: Piatkus, The Curry Club. ISBN 978-0749917425.
- Collingham, Elizabeth M. (2006). Curry: A Tale of Cooks and Conquerors. Oxford University Press. ISBN 0-19-517241-8.
- Collingham, Lizzie (2007). Curry: A Tale of Cooks and Conquerors. Oxford University Press.
- Davidson, Alan (2014). The Oxford Companion to Food (3rd ed.). Oxford University Press. ISBN 978-0-19-967733-7. OCLC 890807357.
- Dickson Wright, Clarissa (2011). A History of English Food. Random House. ISBN 978-1-905211-85-2.
- Hervey, Henrietta (2006) [1895]. Anglo-Indian Cookery at Home. London: Horace Cox. ISBN 978-1-900318-33-4.
- Iyer, Raghavan (2022). On the Curry Trail: Chasing the Flavor That Seduced the World. New York: Workman Publishing. ISBN 978-1523511211. OCLC 1374192575.
- Jaffrey, Madhur (1982). Madhur Jaffrey's Indian Cookery. London: BBC. ISBN 978-0-563-16491-3.
- Magon, Harminder Singh (2016). My Epicurean Journey. Friesen.
- Panayi, Panikos (2010) [2008]. Spicing Up Britain. Reaktion Books. ISBN 978-1-86189-658-2.
- Prasad, G. J. V. (2017). "Idli, Dosai, Sambar, Coffee: Consuming Tamil Identity". In Shweta Rao Garg; Deepti Gupta (eds.). The English Paradigm in India: Essays in Language, Literature and Culture. Springer. pp. 98–99. ISBN 978-981-10-5332-0.
- Sen, Colleen Taylor (2004). Food Culture in India. Greenwood Publishing Group. ISBN 0-313-32487-5.
- Sen, Colleen Taylor (2009). Curry: A Global History. Edible. London: Reaktion Books. ISBN 978-1861895226. OCLC 1391407698.
- Singh, Dharamjit (1973). Indian Cookery. Penguin Books. ISBN 978-0140461411.
