= Crown and Anchor (disambiguation) =

Crown and anchor is a dice game.

Crown and Anchor or Crown & Anchor may also refer to:

== Pubs ==
=== Australia ===
- Crown & Anchor, Adelaide, South Australia

=== United Kingdom ===
- Crown and Anchor, Elstronwick, Yorkshire, England
- Crown and Anchor, Euston, London, UK
- Crown and Anchor Inn, Findhorn, Scotland
- Crown and Anchor, Ham, Wiltshire, England
- Crown and Anchor, Strand, a former (17th-18th-century) tavern in London

== Other uses ==
- Crown and Anchor (film), a 2018 Canadian film

== See also ==
- Crown and Anchor Society, an English loyalist society active between 1792 and 1793
