= Jalfrezi =

Curry dish

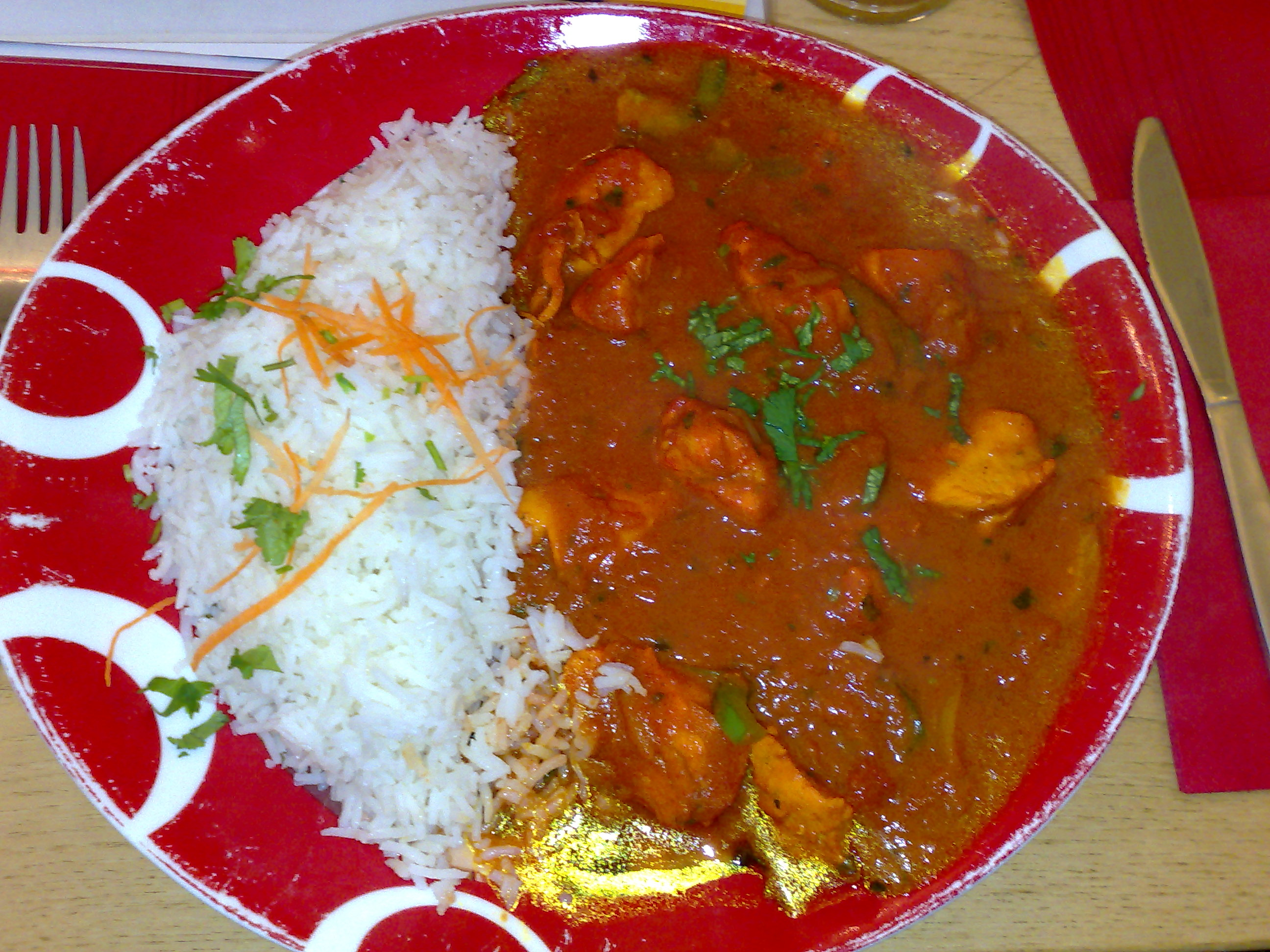
- Chicken jalfrezi
- Alternative names: Jhal frezi
- Type: Curry
- Course: Main
- Region or state: South Asia
- Associated cuisine: Anglo-Indian cuisine
- Main ingredients: Green chillies; meat, seafood, vegetables or paneer

Jalfrezi (/dʒælˈfreɪzi/; Bengali: ঝালফ্রেজী; also jhal frezi, jaffrazi, and many other alternative spellings) is a curry dish popular in Britain. It was created in Bengal during the British Raj to use up leftover meat by stir frying. The stir fry technique was brought to India by Chinese labourers working in Assam tea plantations in the 1830s. The dish consists of a main ingredient such as meat, fish, paneer or vegetables, spiced and stir fried, often with chilli peppers.

In a 2011 survey, jalfrezi was rated the most popular dish in UK Indian restaurants, having taken over from chicken tikka masala. The dish is rare in restaurants in India.

== History ==
Jalfrezi recipes appeared in Anglo-Indian cookbooks during the British Raj as a way of using up cold meat leftovers by frying them with chilli and onion to make a curry. This ignored the fact that eating leftovers was taboo to many Hindus. All the same, the historian of food Navreet Rana writes that it "is impossible to tell that [it is] designed for the use of leftovers." One story is that jalfrezi was the invention of Marcus Sandys, governor of Bengal. The English-language usage is derived from colloquial Bengali jhāl porhezī: jhāl means spicy hot; porhezī means suitable for an abstinent diet.

The stir frying technique used for making jalfrezi was introduced to British India from Chinese cuisine as Chinese labourers migrated to Assam to work in the tea plantations during the 1830s. This meant it was much quicker to make than traditional curries. In Indian restaurants in Britain in the 20th century, "jalfrezi" could mean a standardised curry sauce with a little extra curry powder and food colouring. In a survey in 2011, jalfrezi was rated the most popular dish in British Indian restaurants, having taken over from chicken tikka masala. In 1998 it was reported that one ton of jalfrezi had been made for the UK's National Curry Day. The scholar of culture Arindam Das writes that while it is a well-known dish in British Indian restaurants, it is rare in restaurants in India.

Jalfrezi was created during the British Raj in Bengal to use up leftover meat. Back in Britain, it became a standard Indian restaurant curry with a thick spicy gravy.

== Dish ==
Jalfrezi is made with green chilli peppers, onions, and tomatoes. Vegetables or meat are then stir fried into the mix, using fresh (not leftover) meat such as chicken breast, which may, as in the versions by Jamie Oliver or the Hairy Bikers, be marinated in yoghurt. The British Indian chef Atul Kochhar proposes a version using duck, while Madhur Jaffrey offers a recipe using beef. In Britain, the resulting spicy curry has a thick gravy. The British National Health Service proposes a chicken jalfrezi as a low-fat dish, easy to cook; its recipe includes salt, with a suggestion to use paprika or lemon juice instead for a low-salt version.

In India, The Hindu proposes a "quick fix" chicken jalfrezi without a gravy; the meat is cooked in butter flavoured with chilli, coriander, cumin, fenugreek, garlic, ginger, onion, and tomato, and cooked "till dried". The recipe can be varied using fish, cottage cheese, prawns, and vegetarian options such as paneer in place of meat.
