= Pasanda =

Spicy yogurt-marinated meat curry

Pasanda (pasande)
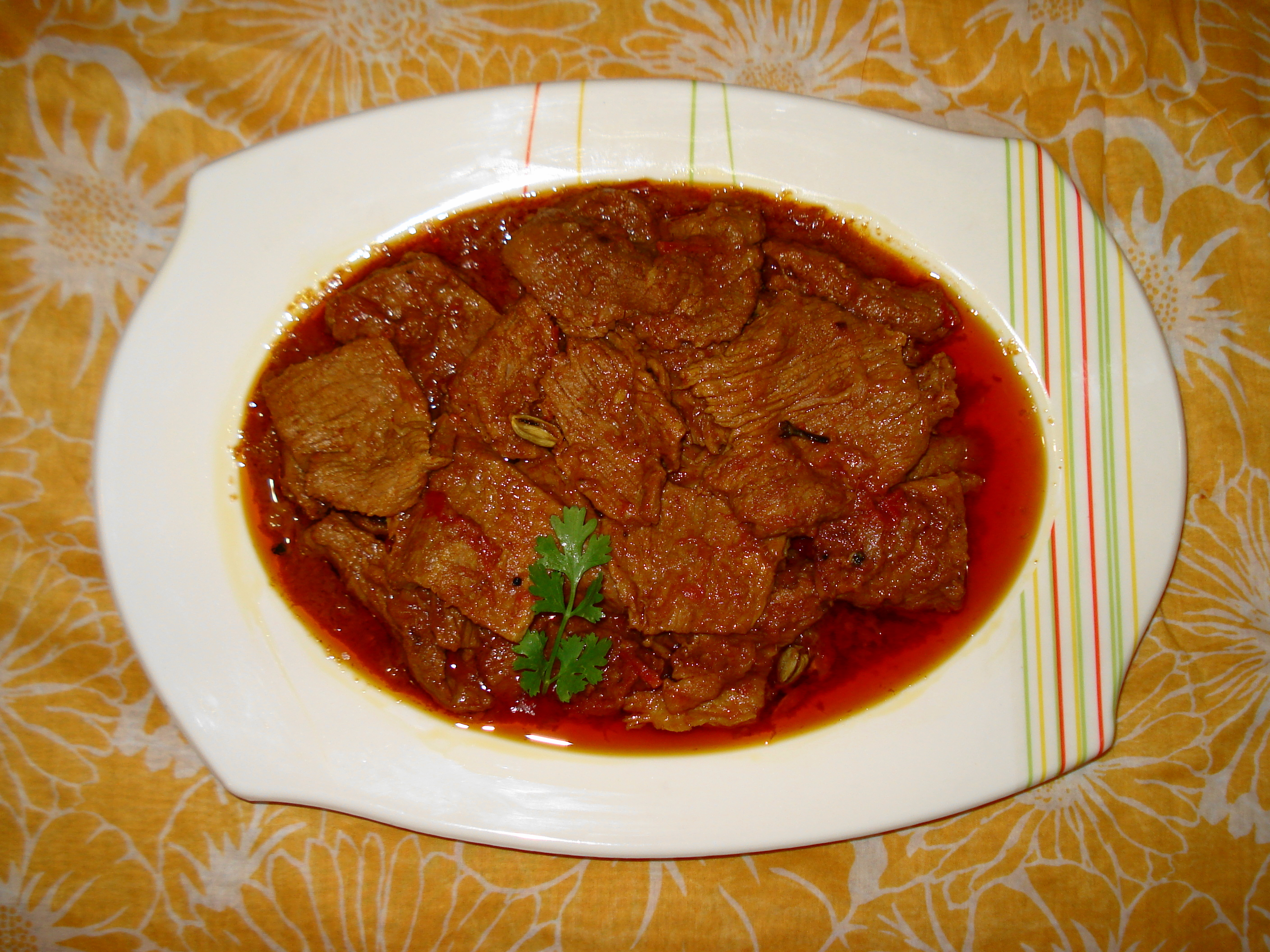
- Pasanda curry
- Alternative names: Parche
- Course: Main course
- Place of origin: Mughal Empire
- Region or state: Indian subcontinent
- Associated cuisine: India, Bangladesh, Pakistan
- Main ingredients: Meat (lamb, goat, beef)
- Variations: Poultry or seafood

Pasanda (Urdu: پسندہ, Hindi: पसन्दा), also called parche (Urdu: پارچے, Hindi: पारचे), is a popular curry from the Indian subcontinent. It is derived from a style of food served in the court of the Mughal emperors. In a pasanda, the meat is marinated in yogurt and spices. After cooking, cream is added to the sauce. It has become a standard type of curry served in British Indian restaurants.

== History ==
The word 'pasanda' is from Urdu پسندہ 'pasande', "favourite", indicating the prime cuts of meat traditionally used in the dish. It is borrowed from the Persian adjective پسندیدن 'pasandideh', "liked".

Pasanda is a dish associated with the Mughal court. The recipe may have developed from earlier cooking techniques, since a similar method of preparation was described in a 12th century Sanskrit text, the Manasollasa.

== Ingredients and preparation ==
Pasanda was originally made with leg of lamb or goat flattened into strips, marinated, and fried in a dish with seasoning. In Pakistan, pasanday is usually made from pot roast beef fillets flattened into strips.

The meat, such as chicken, is marinated in yogurt and spices such as garlic and ginger. Almonds are soaked in warm milk. Spices such as cardamom, cinnamon and chili are tempered by frying briefly in oil, then cooked on a low heat with onions and garlic. The almonds and milk are ground to a paste and added to the onions. The meat is added to the mixture and simmered until soft. At the end, cream is added.

== Variants ==
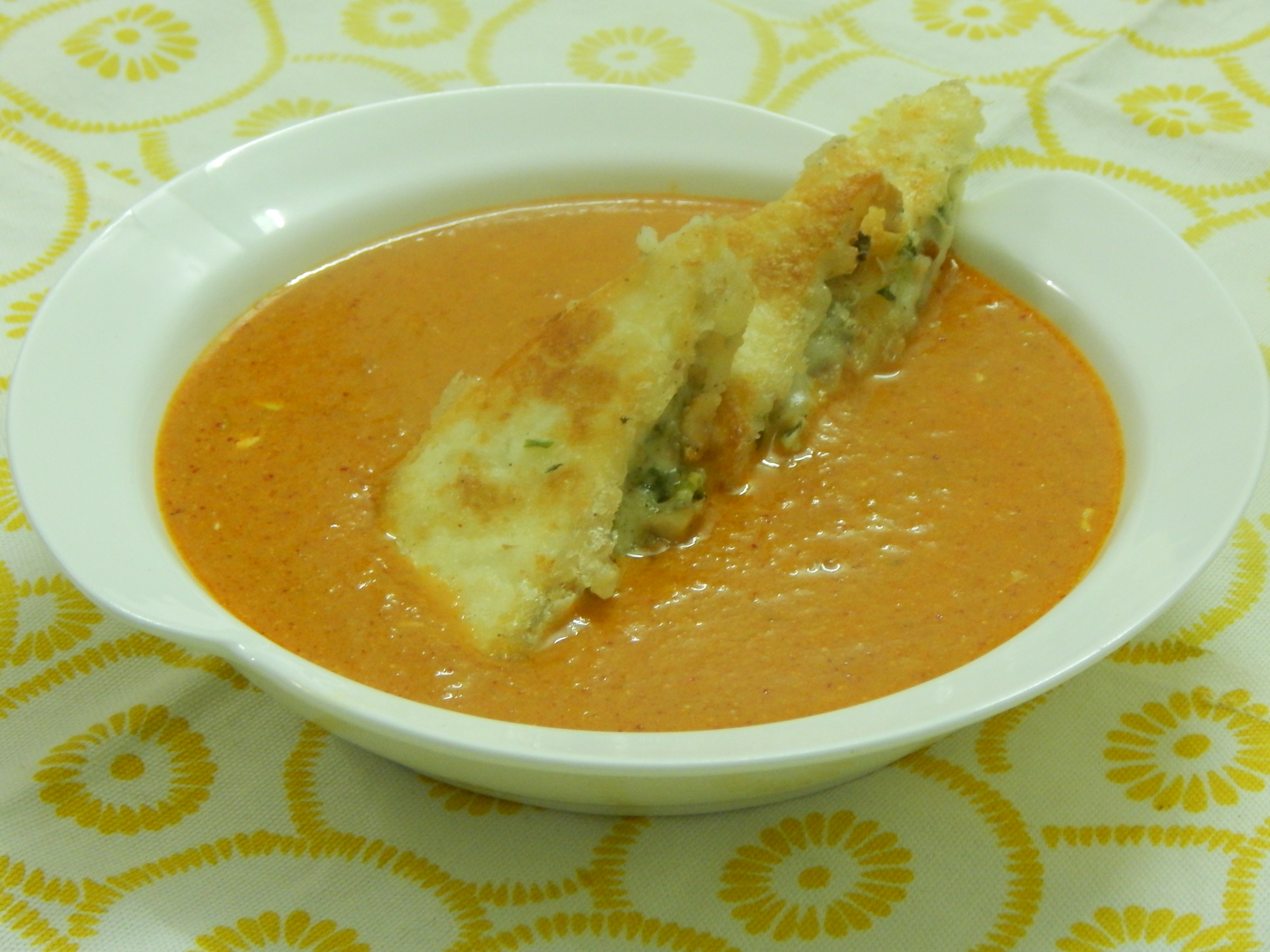
Paneer pasanda

A vegetarian pasanda can be prepared with paneer, Indian cheese, in place of meat.

In Awadhi cuisine (from Northern India and Southern Nepal), pasanda is prepared in kebab form.

In the United Kingdom, pasanda means a mild curry sauce with cream or coconut milk. It has become a standard type of curry served in British Indian restaurants.

== See also ==
- List of lamb dishes
- Pakistani meat dishes
