= Phall =

British Asian curry

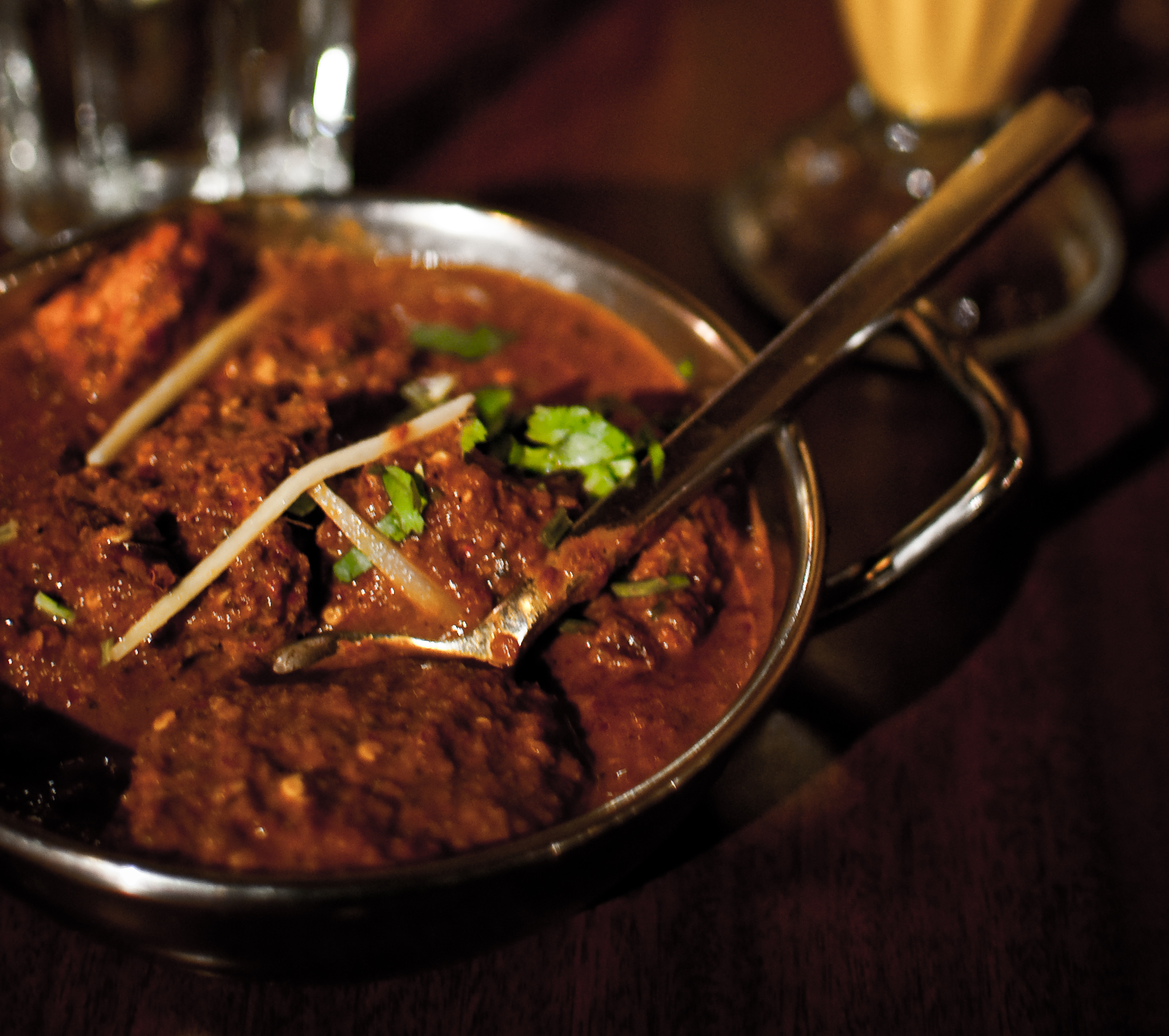
- Chicken phaal from the Brick Lane Curry House, New York
- Alternative names: Fall, faal, phaal, phal, fal
- Type: Curry
- Place of origin: England
- Region or state: Birmingham
- Main ingredients: chili peppers (scotch bonnet, habanero or Carolina Reaper peppers), tomatoes, ginger, choice of protein

Phall (Bengali: ফাল, lit. 'jump') (Note: Phall is also spelt fall, faal, phaal, fahl, and fal.) is an extremely hot curry that originated in Britain, specifically in the Bangladeshi-owned curry-houses of Birmingham, England, in 1971.

== British Bangladeshi curry ==
Phall is a curry that originated in the Bangladeshi-owned curry-houses of Birmingham, England, in 1971. It is not to be confused with the char-grilled, gravyless, finger food phall from Bangalore. It is the hottest form of curry regularly available, even hotter than vindaloo, using many ground standard chilli peppers, or a hotter type of chilli such as scotch bonnet, habanero, or Carolina Reaper. The dish is a tomato-based thick curry and includes ginger and optionally fennel seeds. Phall has achieved notoriety as the spiciest generally available dish from Indian restaurants.

In 2008 in the UK, a charity competition in Hampshire was based on competitors eating increasingly hot phalls.
