= Pathia =

Indian form of curry

- Type: Curry
- Associated cuisine: British
- Serving temperature: Hot, with Pilau rice
- Main ingredients: Chili peppers, tamarind, lime, sugar

Pathia is a form of curry in the United Kingdom, developed from a Parsi cuisine fish stew of the same name. It is sweet, sour, and subtly spicy.

== Parsi stew ==
The original pathia is a dish in Parsi cuisine (Indian Zoroastrians). It consists of a seafood stew that usually accompanies rice and dal.

A modified version, described as an "easy Parsi fish patia" on BBC Food proposes salmon or any white fish in a curry sauce based on fried onions and garlic, with turmeric, lime juice, tomato, chili, coriander, sugar, and vinegar.

== British curry ==
The British pathia is a curry that can be made with chicken. A version on BBC Food calls for a sauce made from onions, ginger, and garlic fried in oil, flavoured with tomato, tamarind, chili, lime juice, sugar, bay, and turmeric. The result is a "subtly sweet and sour Persian curry".

A version described by India's NDTV as being the British dish calls for making a sauce with ghee, ginger, garlic, onions, and tomatoes, flavoured with chili, coriander, cumin, sour tamarind pulp, and sweet mangoes. The dish is thus hot, sweet, and sour.
