= Balti (food) =

Curry cooked and served in a wok

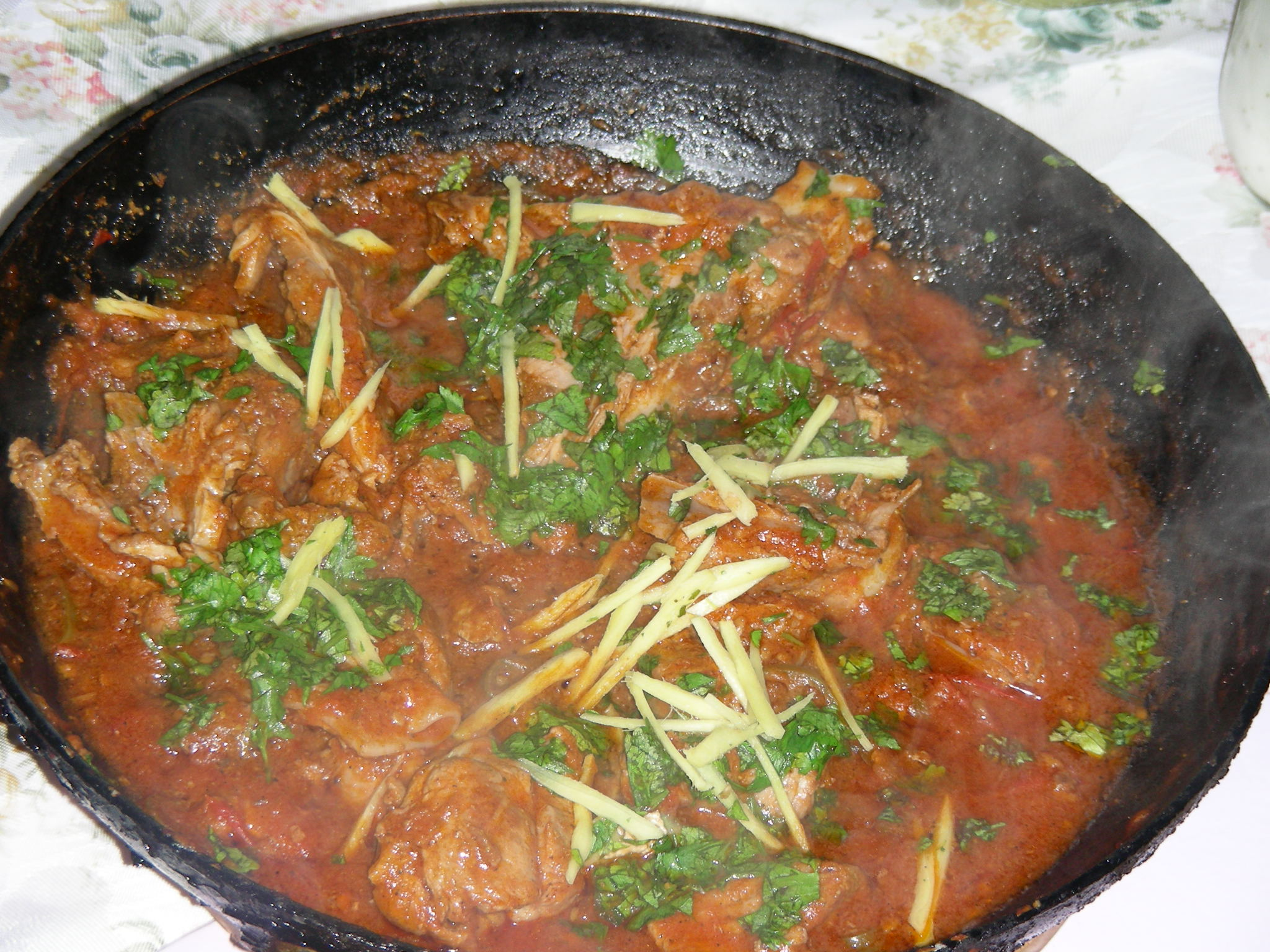
Balti gosht with lamb in the thin pressed-steel balti bowl, in the United Kingdom

A balti or bāltī gosht (Urdu: بالٹی گوشت, Hindi: बाल्टी गोश्त) is a type of curry within the United Kingdom served in a thin, pressed-steel wok called a balti bowl. Balti curries are cooked quickly using vegetable oil rather than ghee, over high heat in the manner of a stir-fry, and any meat is used off the bone. Balti sauce is based on garlic and onions, with spices including turmeric and garam masala. The dish was developed in Birmingham, England, in the 1970s. A region of Birmingham with many balti restaurants has become known as the Balti Triangle. An application was made to the European Union to make "Birmingham Balti" a traditional speciality guaranteed product; the application failed because the allowed variations were not precisely defined.

== Origin ==
=== Baltistan ===
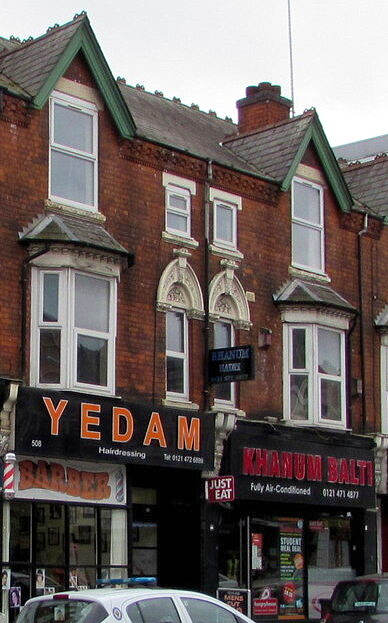
It is believed that balti was invented in Birmingham. A balti house is shown.

The food writer Pat Chapman supposed that balti curry could be traced to the area of Baltistan, in Northern Kashmir, and in 1998 published a book, Balti Bible, about the cuisine. Adil's restaurant in Stoney Lane, Sparkbrook, a district of Birmingham, founded in 1977, called itself "the home of Balti Cuisine", stating that its dishes followed the traditions of Northern Kashmir. However, the Canadian food writer Colleen Taylor Sen states that balti's origins are unclear, as the food eaten in Baltistan "bears no resemblance" to balti curry. A typical Gilgit-Baltistan dish is rdoong balay, a stew made of ground wheat, potatoes, peas, and spices.

=== Balti cooking pot ===
Sen suggests instead that the name of the food may have originated from the fact that it is cooked in a pot named a baltī, similar to a karahi. The word "balti" is the Hindi for "bucket", from the Portuguese balde of the same meaning. It is claimed that the thin steel balti wok was, like the curry, invented and manufactured in Birmingham in the 1970s, differing from traditional heavy cast iron cooking pots.

=== A piece of marketing ===
However, some balti restaurateurs of Birmingham have claimed that they invented the dish to please their white British clientele. The British-Pakistani scholar of culture Ziauddin Sardar describes the invention as a triumph of marketing, making balti houses seem more authentic than "the bog-standard confines of curry and vindaloo". Sardar comments that he personally cannot tell balti from other curries. The scholar of food Parama Roy, citing Sardar, adds that the success of the marketing effort "is evidenced by the publication of the Balti Bible by Pat Chapman". The historian of food Lizzie Collingham and the Oxford English Dictionary concur that Pakistani restaurateurs invented balti in Birmingham. In 2014, the Indian cook Madhur Jaffrey described the balti style of cooking as a "craze with no authentic origins which will slowly die as people's tastes turn to more complex dishes".

== Dish ==
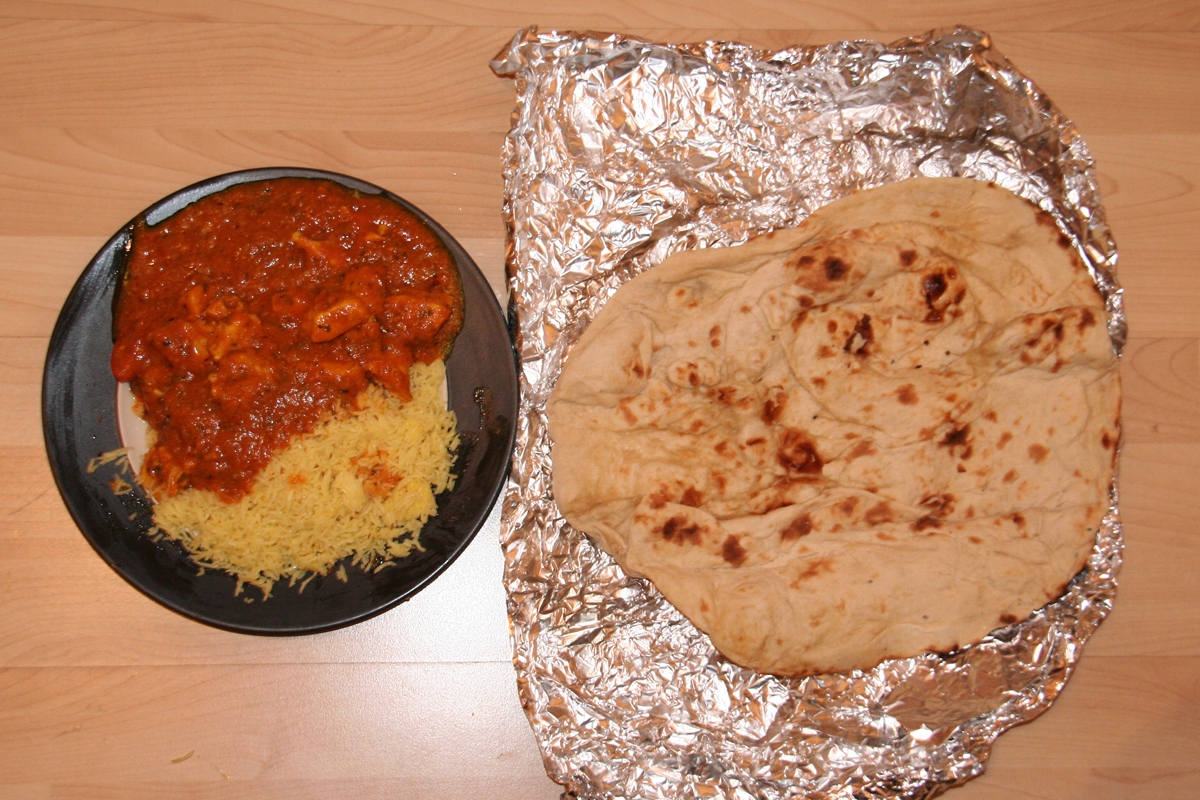
Balti chicken takeaway with rice and naan in Edinburgh, Scotland

A balti curry as originally cooked in Birmingham is stir-fried in very hot vegetable oil rather than ghee. The base of the curry is onion or tomato, mixed with garlic and ginger, and spiced with cumin, fenugreek, garam masala, and turmeric; the meat is usually chicken or lamb.

Collingham writes that despite the supposed Kashmir origin, "the restaurant balti unashamedly makes a virtue out of restaurant short cuts." She describes the dish as using meat that has been marinated and then pre-cooked. A separately prepared sauce is "a version of Indian restaurant curry sauce". She lists both onions and tomatoes as ingredients, and describes fresh coriander as "important". The mix of oil-fried spices can be varied. Finally, she states that variations are created by adding a choice of alternative ingredients such as fenugreek, lentils, or pieces of pineapple.

== Balti houses ==
Balti restaurants are often known in Birmingham as 'balti houses'. These typically offer large karack naan bread pieces, to be shared by the whole table. Some 50 balti houses were originally clustered along and behind the main road between Sparkhill and Moseley, to the south of Birmingham city centre. This area, comprising Ladypool Road, Stoney Lane, and Stratford Road, is sometimes called the Balti Triangle, as it contains a high concentration of balti restaurants. On 28 July 2005, a tornado caused extensive damage to buildings in the triangle, forcing many restaurants to close. Most reopened by the beginning of 2006 but by 2023 only four remained.

Since the late 1990s, British supermarkets have stocked a growing range of prepacked balti meals, and the balti restaurant sector has faced increasing competition both from retail and from changes in customer tastes.

== Application for EU protected status ==
In 2012, the Birmingham Balti Association applied to the European Union to make "Birmingham Balti" a traditional speciality guaranteed (TSG) product, claiming that two features made it distinctive, namely cooking with vegetable oil, and incorporating each ingredient separately while the stir-frying. The application was pursued until 2016 but failed. The reason for rejecting the application was that the dish was not cooked to a standard recipe, or as the EU stated:

Some different varieties of balti are allowed; those varieties are not definitively identified. The colour of the dish changes (either lighter brown or more reddish) depending on which ingredients are added. The additional ingredients and spices may but [do] not have to be added. It is therefore not possible to determine what the final recipe to be followed is.

== See also ==
- Chicken tikka masala
