= Bundobust =

Indian restaurant chain company in UK

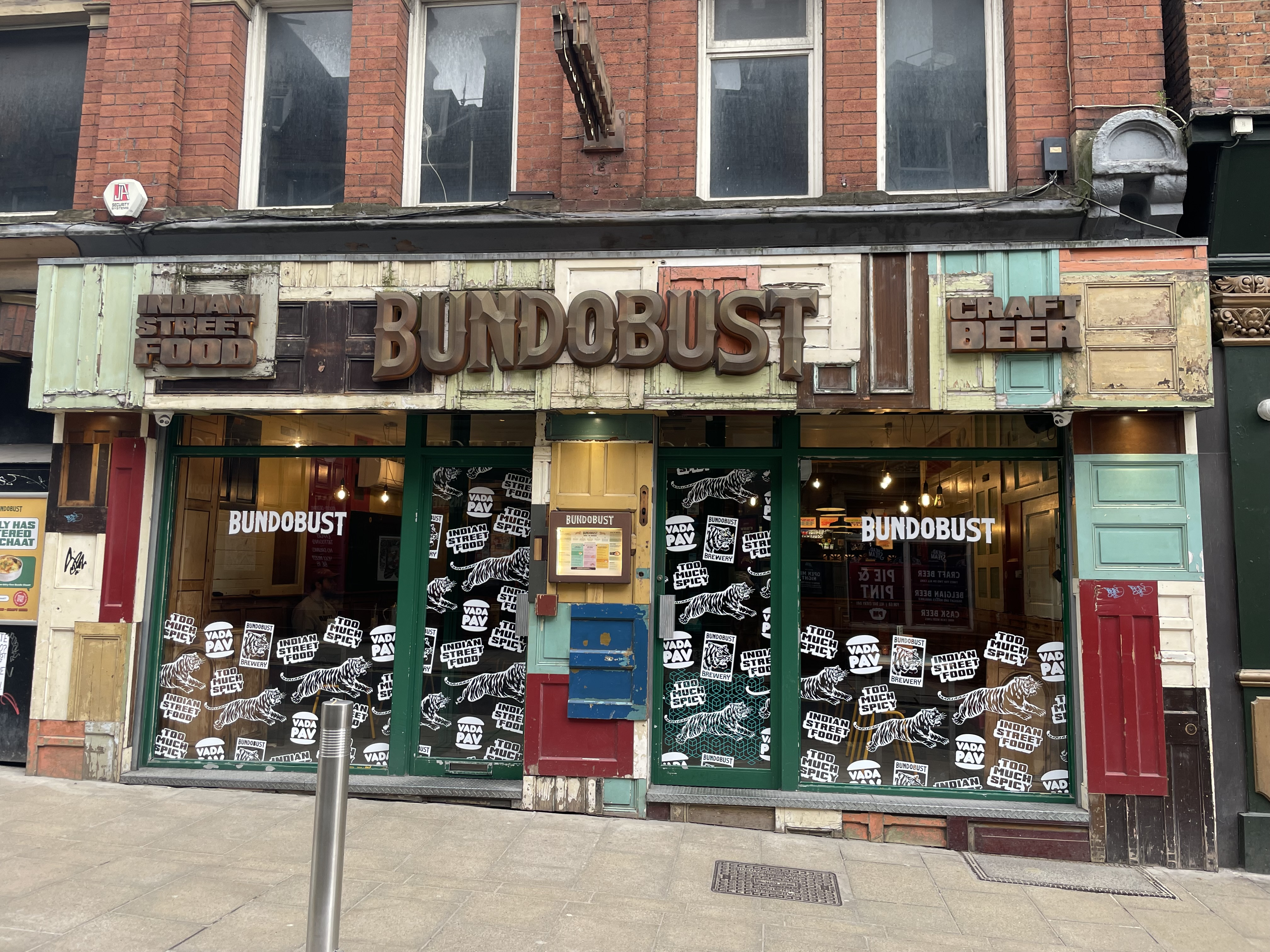
- Bundobust Leeds Exterior
- Type: Private
- Industry: Restaurants, craft beer
- Founded: 2014
- Founders: Mayur Patel, Marko Husak
- Headquarters: Leeds, England
- Number of locations: 4 (2025); Leeds, Manchester, Liverpool
- Products: Indian vegetarian street food, craft beer
- Services: Restaurant, Brewery

Bundobust in an Indian street food restaurant and Craft Beer brewery - with venues in Leeds, Manchester and Liverpool. It was started in Leeds in 2014 by Mayur Patel and Marko Husak from Bradford.

It specialises in casual dining Indian-style street food and sharing spreads, inspired by Gujarat and beyond, alongside craft beer brewed at their own Bundobust Brewery in Manchester.

After building a loyal following through appearances at street food and beer festivals, Bundo’s first bricks and mortar venue opened in Leeds in 2014, followed by Manchester Piccadilly in 2016. This hit the ground running and receiving a glowing Jay Rayner review in its first 3 months and a site on the Bold Street, Liverpool’s hub of independent food & drink opened in 2019.

By 2026, Bundobust was operating four restaurants across Leeds, Liverpool & Manchester. The company has gained recognition in the UK food scene, being named in the Observer Food Monthly's "OFM 50" list of top food and drink businesses, featured on Rick Stein's BBC show "Yorkshire Food Stories", and shortlisted for a Deliveroo Restaurant Award in 2025.

They have received national awards including ‘Best Innovation’ at The Casual Dining Awards, ‘UK’s Best Taproom’ at the SIBA Awards and ‘Best Food Offering’ at Leeds Oliver Awards.

Bundobust's venues have various themes ranging from beer hall, to modern taproom, to cosy pub. Tables are available to book for both food and drink, as well as leaving space for causal walk-ins - and all venues offer drinks and take away food.

== Menu ==
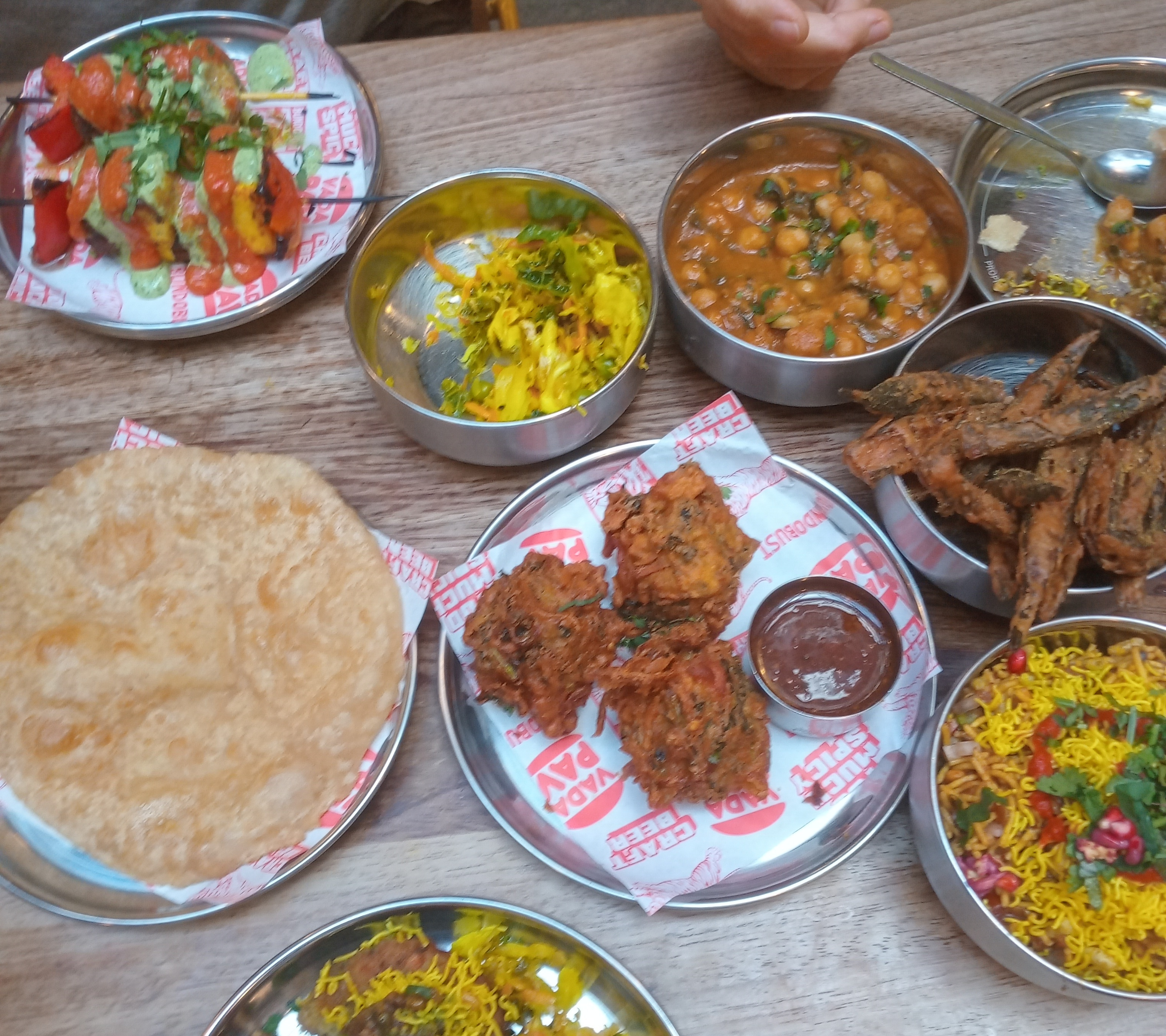
Bundobust dishes, in Manchester

The menu at Bundobust is vast, encouraging customers to pick an array of dishes to share amongst the table - to bring together a plate of flavours and textures. The menu is split into sections to help customers do so.

They are well known for their Vada Pav Sliders, Bundo Chaat, Okra Fries and Pav Bhaji.

Bundobust regularly hosts specials, bringing fusion flavours on limited-edition menus or collaborations with other restaurants, bands or brands.

Special menus have included Indo-Mexican, - combining two street-food cultures, Indo-Chinese menu - inspired by Kolkata's China Town, and Oktoberfest, based on Munich's beer festival.

Bundobust's menu has no meat, and is 75% vegan and 57% gluten free.

They have collaborated with independent restaurants including Nells Pizza in Manchester and Madre in Liverpool. They have also collaborated with brands like Tofoo and Oatly.

In 2021 they launched their own - now award-winning - Bundobust Brewery, brewing beers only available in Bundobust venues, and designed to pair perfectly with their dishes, as well as a cocktail list crafted in collaboration between the bar and kitchen.

== History ==
Emerging from Leeds' street food and craft beer boom of early 20-teens, Bundobust started as a collaboration between Leeds restaurateur Mayur Patel and Marko Husak of craft beer outlet The Sparrow in Bradford,, who merged their expertise in Indian cooking (from Patel's family's restaurant, Prashad) and beer, after a tweet from Patel to Husak, proposing collaboration.

The name Bundobust comes from an Anglo-Indian word meaning "binding" or "coming together".

Bundo grew from a supper club to a street food stall at local beer, music, and food festivals. The first permanent Bundobust opened in Leeds in 2014, followed by a restaurant in Piccadilly Gardens, Manchester in 2016, a branch in Liverpool in 2019, and Bundobust Brewery in Manchester in 2021.

== Bundobust Brewery ==
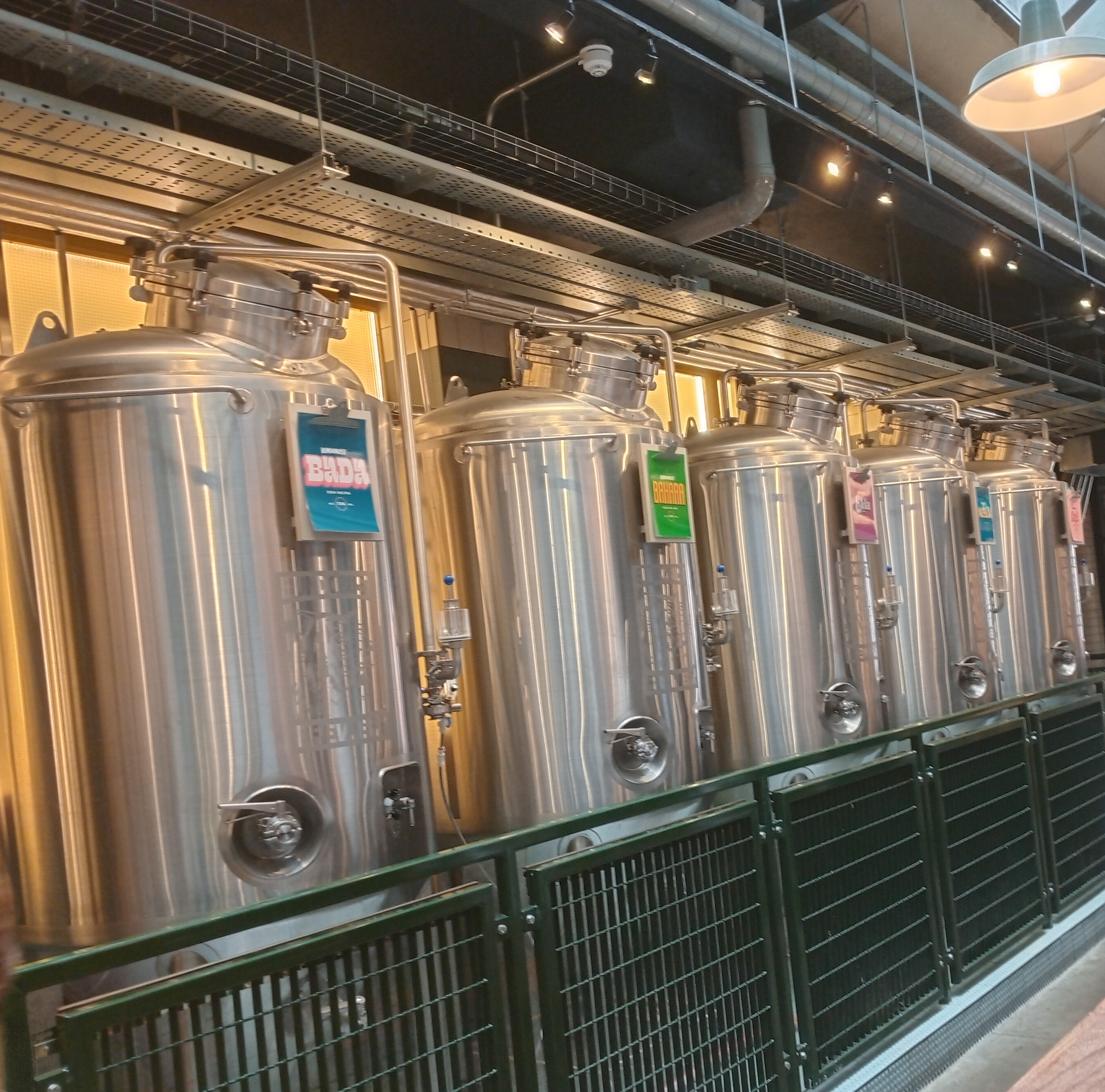
Bundobust Brewery, Manchester

In September 2021, Bundobust launched the Bundobust Brewery inside the Grade II-listed St James Building on Oxford Street, Manchester. Previously a car mechanics, many of the old buildings designs can be found on the walls.

The brewery produces a core range of beers designed to complement Bundobust's food, including PYTHON Premium Lager and PEELA Hazy Pale Ale, alongside limited-edition beers throughout the year, brewed with seasonal flavours - available only at Bundobust venues. The brewery has also released beers in collaboration with breweries including Northern Monk, Deya, and Sureshot Brewery.

The site functions both as a restaurant and a 150-seat taproom, housing a 10-hectolitre brewery capable of producing up to 20,000 pints per month. The brewery is headed by Dan Hocking, formerly of Uiltje Brewery in the Netherlands.

Each venue has a line-up of taps featuring Bundobust Brewery beers, alongside local keg and cask beers, as well as a selection of cans and bottles.
