= Crown and Anchor, Euston =

Pub in Euston, London

Coordinates: 51.526897°N 0.136987°W

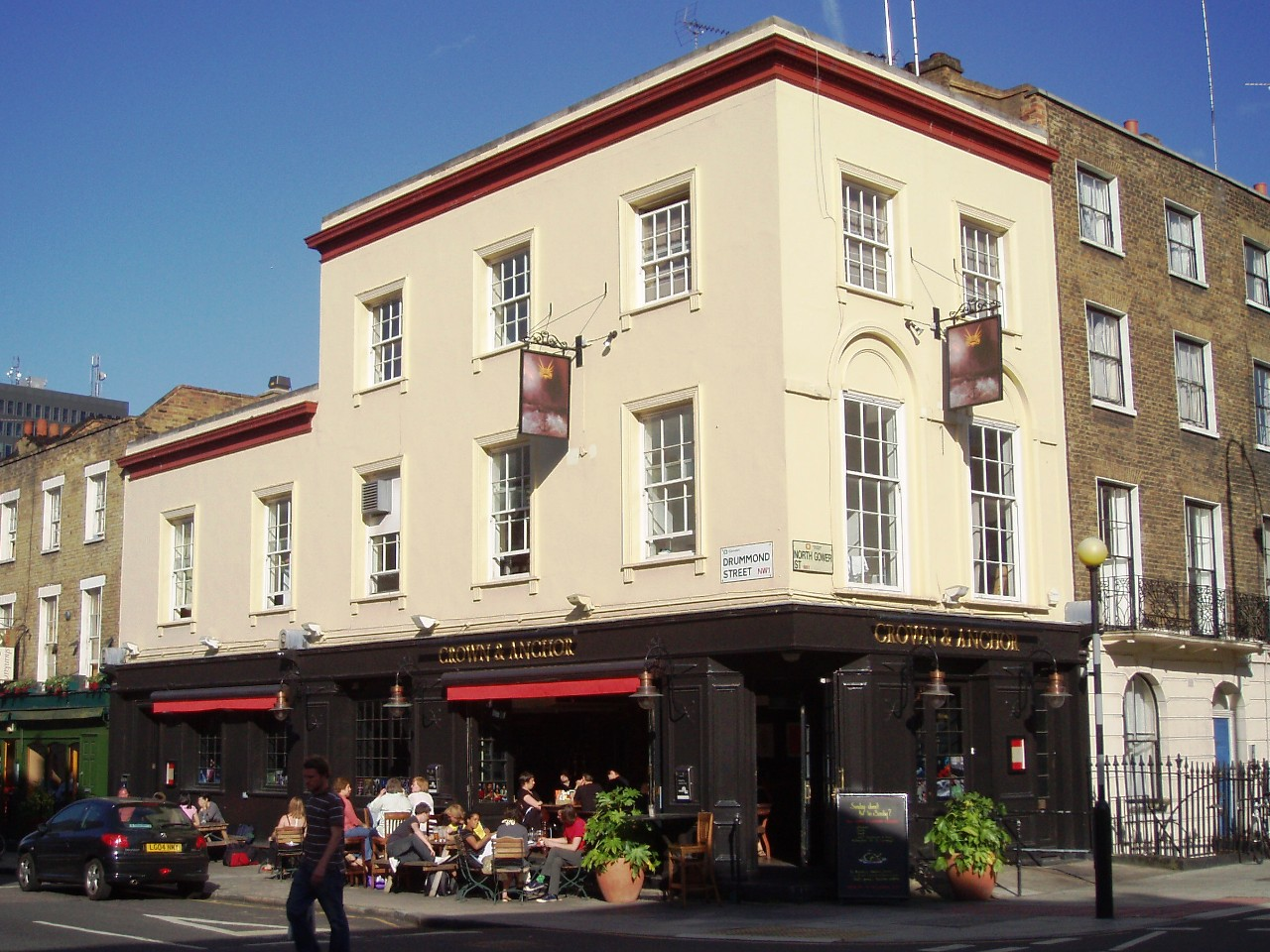
The Crown and Anchor

The Crown and Anchor is a Grade II listed public house at 137 Drummond Street, Euston, London NW1 2HL.

It was built in the 19th century.
