= Curry powder =

Spice mix

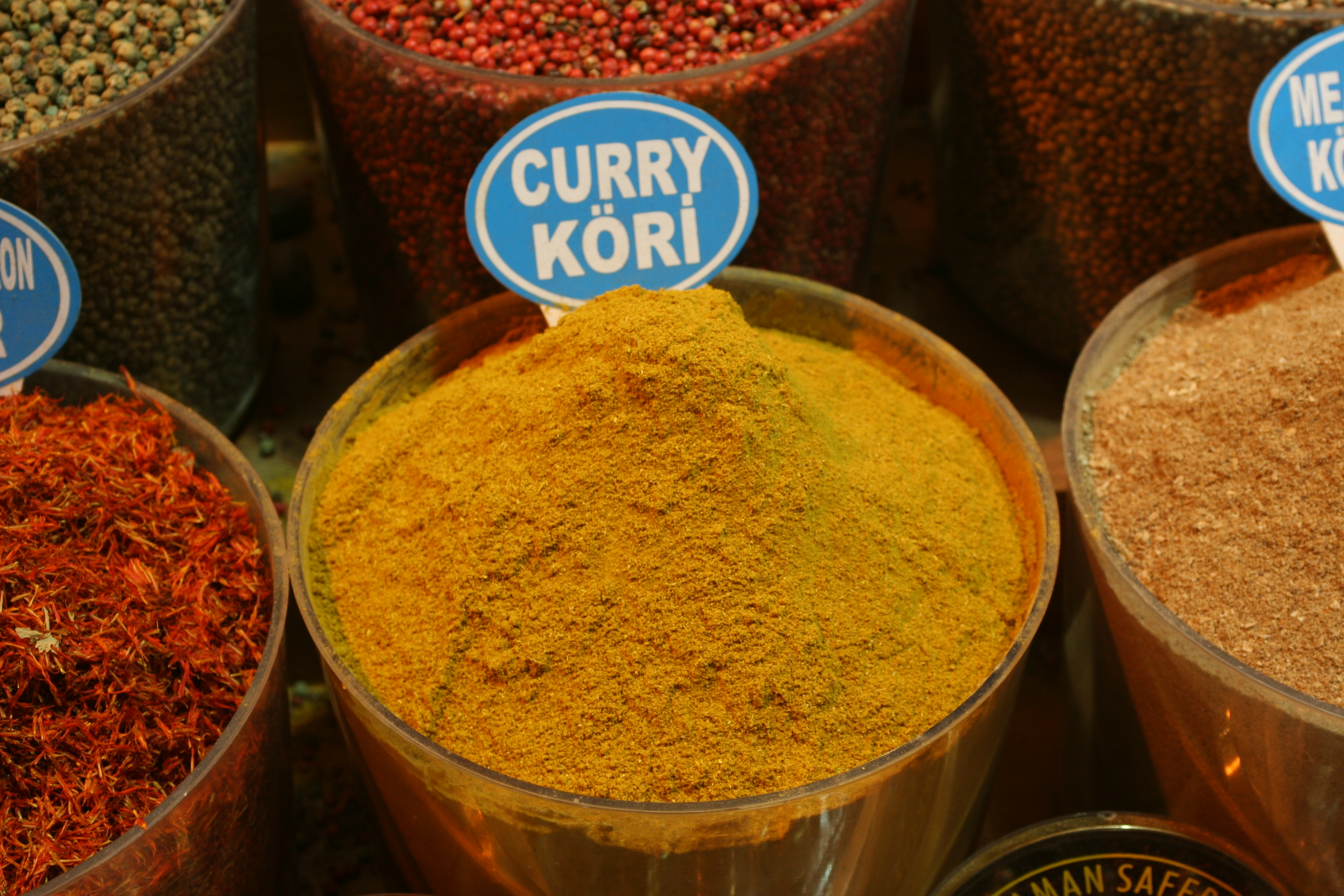
- Type: Curry
- Region or state: Indian subcontinent
- Main ingredients: Spices (e.g. coriander, turmeric, cumin, chili peppers)

Curry powder is any of several spice mixes for curry, adapted from garam masala in Indian cuisine. It was first sold by Indian merchants to British traders during the period of Company rule in India. The first commercial curry powder product was sold by Sorlie's Perfumery in London in 1784. Brands such as Crosse & Blackwell and Sharwood's were established in the 18th and 19th centuries.

== History ==
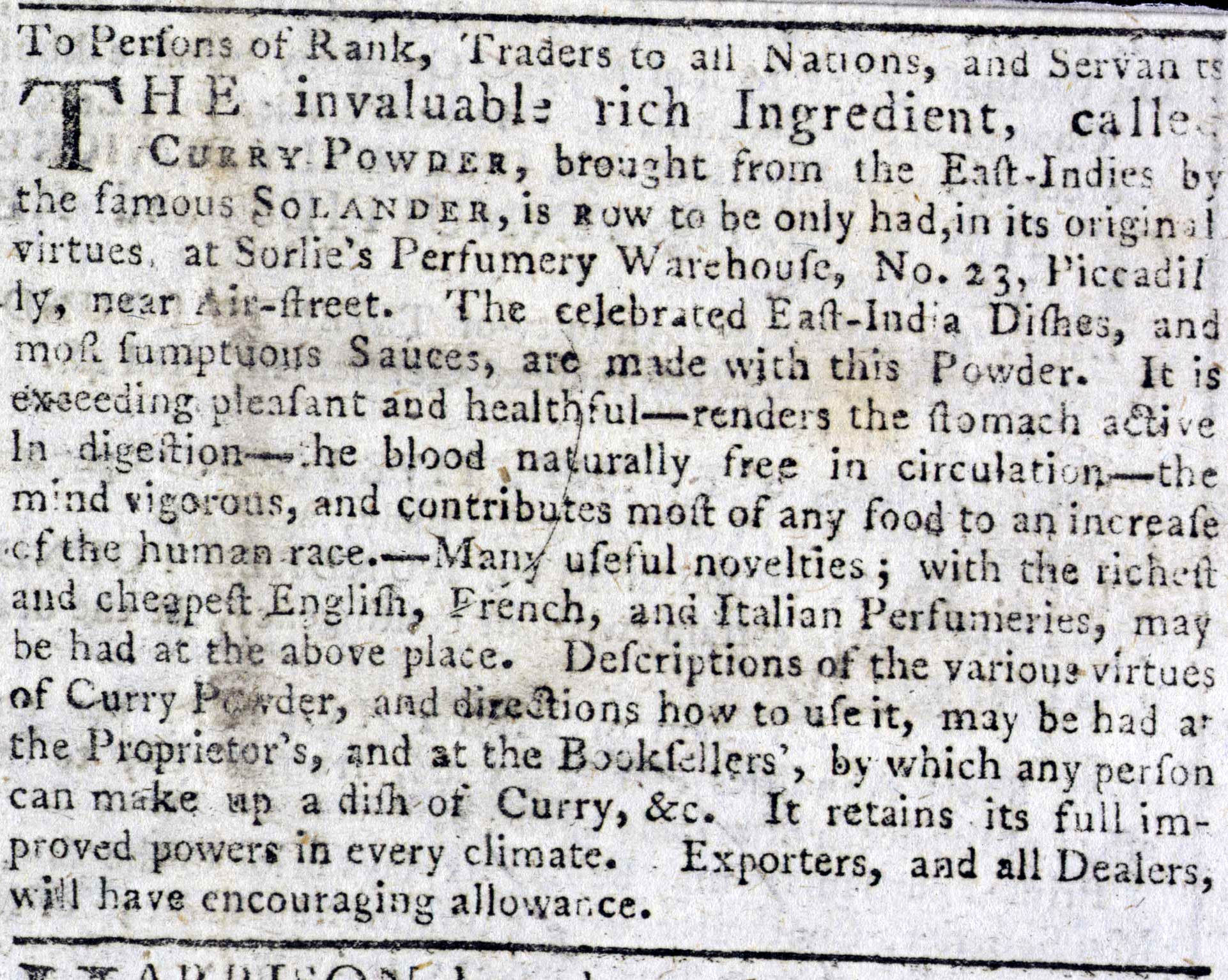
The earliest advertisement for curry powder, by Sorlie's Perfumery Warehouse, Piccadilly, London, 1784

As commercially available in Western markets, curry powder is comparable to the traditional Indian spice mixture known as garam masala ('warm spices'). Conceived as a ready-made ingredient intended to replicate the flavor of an Indian sauce, it was first sold by Indian merchants to British traders during the period of Company rule in India. The first commercially available curry powder in England was advertised by Sorlie's Perfumery Warehouse on Piccadilly in 1784.

Curry powder was used as an ingredient in 18th-century British recipe books, and commercially available from the late 18th century, with brands such as Crosse & Blackwell and Sharwood's persisting to the present. In Australia, a common curry spice mix is Keen's. The ingredient "curry powder", along with instructions on how to produce it, is also seen in 19th-century US and Australian cookbooks, and advertisements.

British traders introduced the powder to Meiji Japan, in the mid-19th century, where it became known as "Japanese curry", and evolved into a distinct dish.

Ingredients of 3 curry powders in Henrietta Hervey's Anglo-Indian Cooking at Home (1895)
Ingredient	Madras	Bombay	Bengal
Coriander	✓	✓	✓
Chilli	✓	✓	✓
Black pepper	✓	✓	✓
Cumin	✓	✓	
Mustard seed	✓	✓	
Turmeric		✓	✓
Fenugreek		✓	✓
Ginger			✓
Saffron	✓		

In her 1895 book Anglo-Indian Cooking at Home, Henrietta Hervey described how to make three curry powders, which she called "Madras", "Bombay", and "Bengal". The "Madras" powder recipe called for coriander, saffron, chilli, mustard seed, pepper, and cumin, among other ingredients. The "Bombay" recipe used coriander, cumin, turmeric, mustard seed, pepper, chillies, and a little fenugreek. The "Bengal" mixture consisted mainly of coriander, turmeric, fenugreek, ginger, black pepper, and chilli. For cooks in England, Hervey suggested the commercial Crosse & Blackwell mixture, which she called "the nearest approach to the real article", but "a pis aller [a desperate measure] at the best". Hervey's recipe for an Anglo-Indian favourite for a British audience, "Country Captain" chicken curry, consisted of a chicken cut into joints, dusted with curry powder, and fried with onions.

== Etymology ==
In the West, the word "curry" is a broad reference to many different Indian or derivative dishes prepared with different combinations of spices. The English word "curry" is derived from the Tamil word kaṟi meaning 'sauce' or 'relish for rice'.

== Standards ==
Some standards on curry powder have been defined. Most outline analytical requirements such as moisture, ash content, and oil content as well as permissible additives. Some also define a number of expected ingredients. In the United States, curry powder is expected to contain at least these ingredients: turmeric, coriander, fenugreek, cinnamon, cumin, black pepper, ginger, and cardamom. The 1999 East African Standard (EAS 98:1999) does not define an ingredient baseline. A newer 2017 draft from Uganda does require turmeric, coriander, cumin, fenugreek and mustard. The Indian (FSSAI), Pakistani (PS:1741–1997), and international (ISO 2253:1999) standards do not define a baseline of essential ingredients.

== Nutritional information ==
One tablespoon (6.3 g) of typical curry powder contains the following nutrients according to the USDA:

- Food energy: 84 kJ (20 kcal)
- Fat: 0.883 g
- Carbohydrates: 3.52 g
- Fibre: 3.35 g
- Protein: 0.9 g

== See also ==
- List of culinary herbs and spices
- Seasoning

== Sources ==
- Hervey, Henrietta (2006) [1895]. Anglo-Indian Cookery at Home. London: Horace Cox. ISBN 978-1-900318-33-4.
