= Drummond Street, London =

Street in London

Coordinates: 51.5273°N 0.1363°W

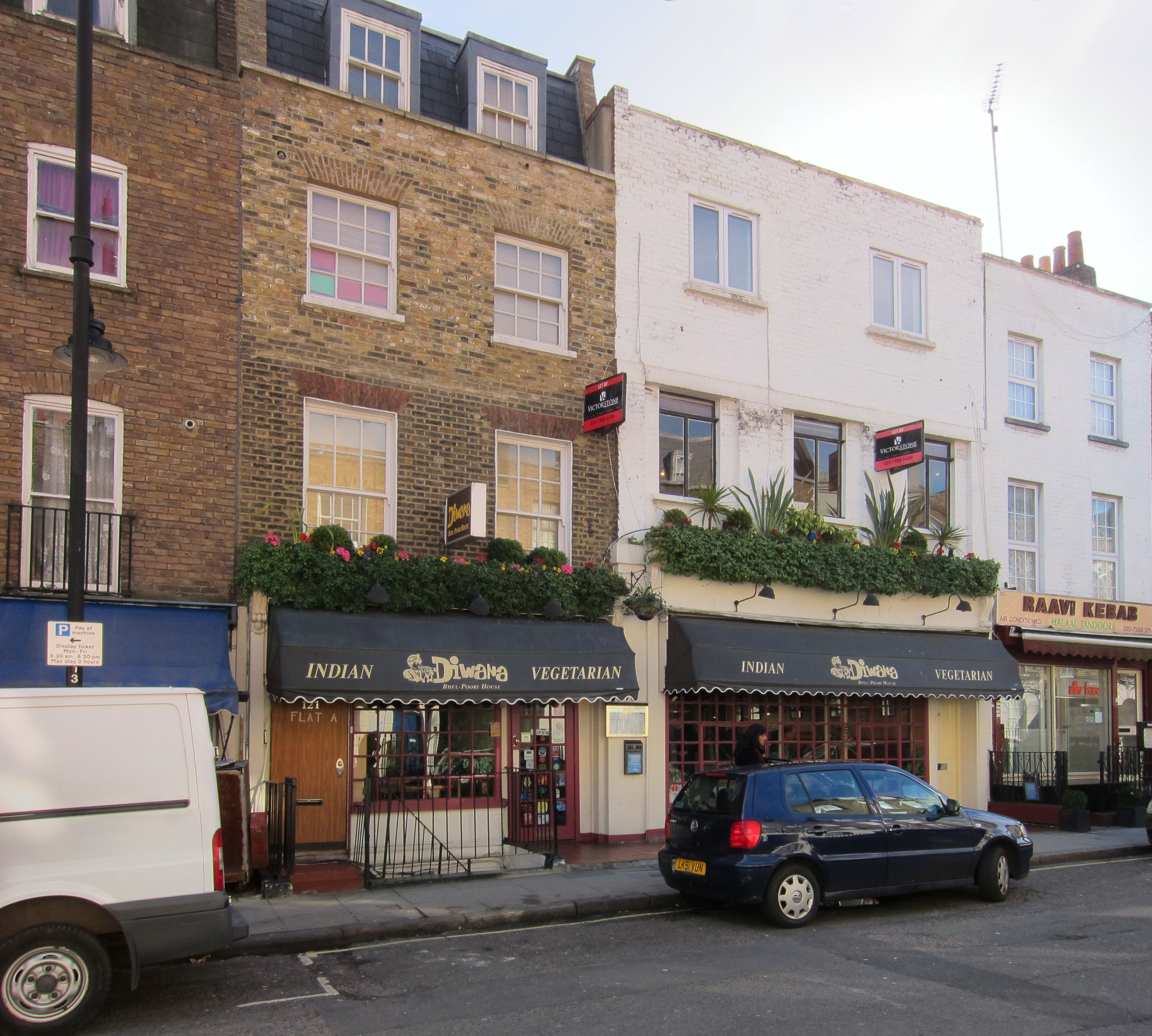
Indian restaurants on Drummond Street, including the Diwana Bhel Poori House, which opened in 1970

Drummond Street is a street in London just north of the centre, located near Euston station and running parallel with Euston Road. It is best known for its concentration of Indian and Bangladeshi restaurants and supply shops, including Diwana Bhel Poori House which claims to be the oldest South Indian vegetarian restaurant in Britain, having opened in 1970.

== History ==
The street was once considerably longer, continuing north-eastwards through what is now Euston station and also including what is now Doric Way. The vanished section included the main entrance to the station and the site of the Euston Arch. The eastern part of Drummond Street was built over when Euston station was rebuilt and extended southwards in 1961; the Euston Arch was demolished, the far north-eastern part of Drummond Street was renamed Doric Way, and Drummond Street was separated from the formerly-adjacent Drummond Crescent to the north.

On the street is Schafer House, a student hall of residence of University College London.

Since 2019 the eastern extremity of Drummond Street has seen mass demolition of various properties to accommodate the expansion of Euston station for the construction of the High Speed 2 railway line. The original surface building of Euston tube station at the corner of adjacent Melton Street, constructed by the Charing Cross, Euston and Hampstead Railway in the 1900s to a standard design by Leslie Green, is under threat of demolition for the same reason.

The Crown and Anchor is a Grade II listed public house at 137 Drummond Street.

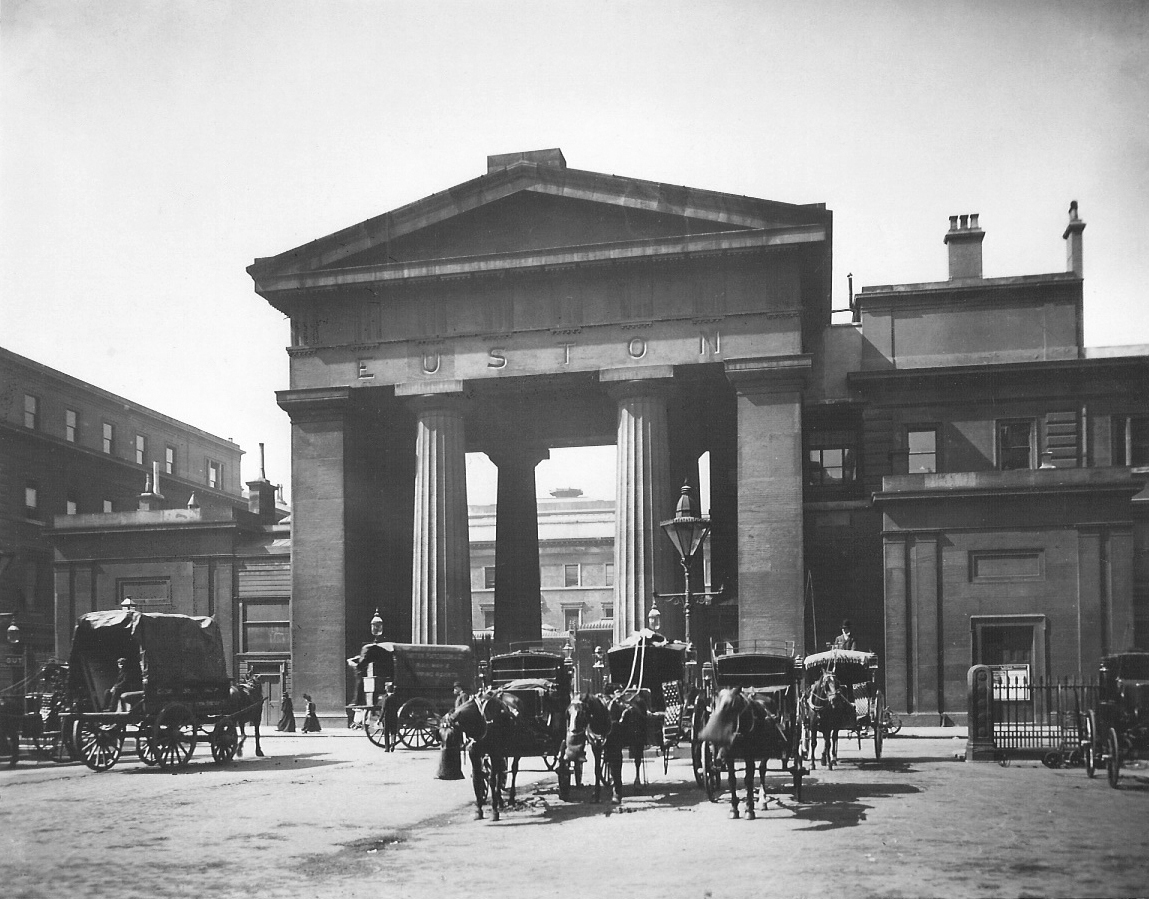
The Euston Arch in the 1890s. Both it and that part of Drummond Street were destroyed in 1961.

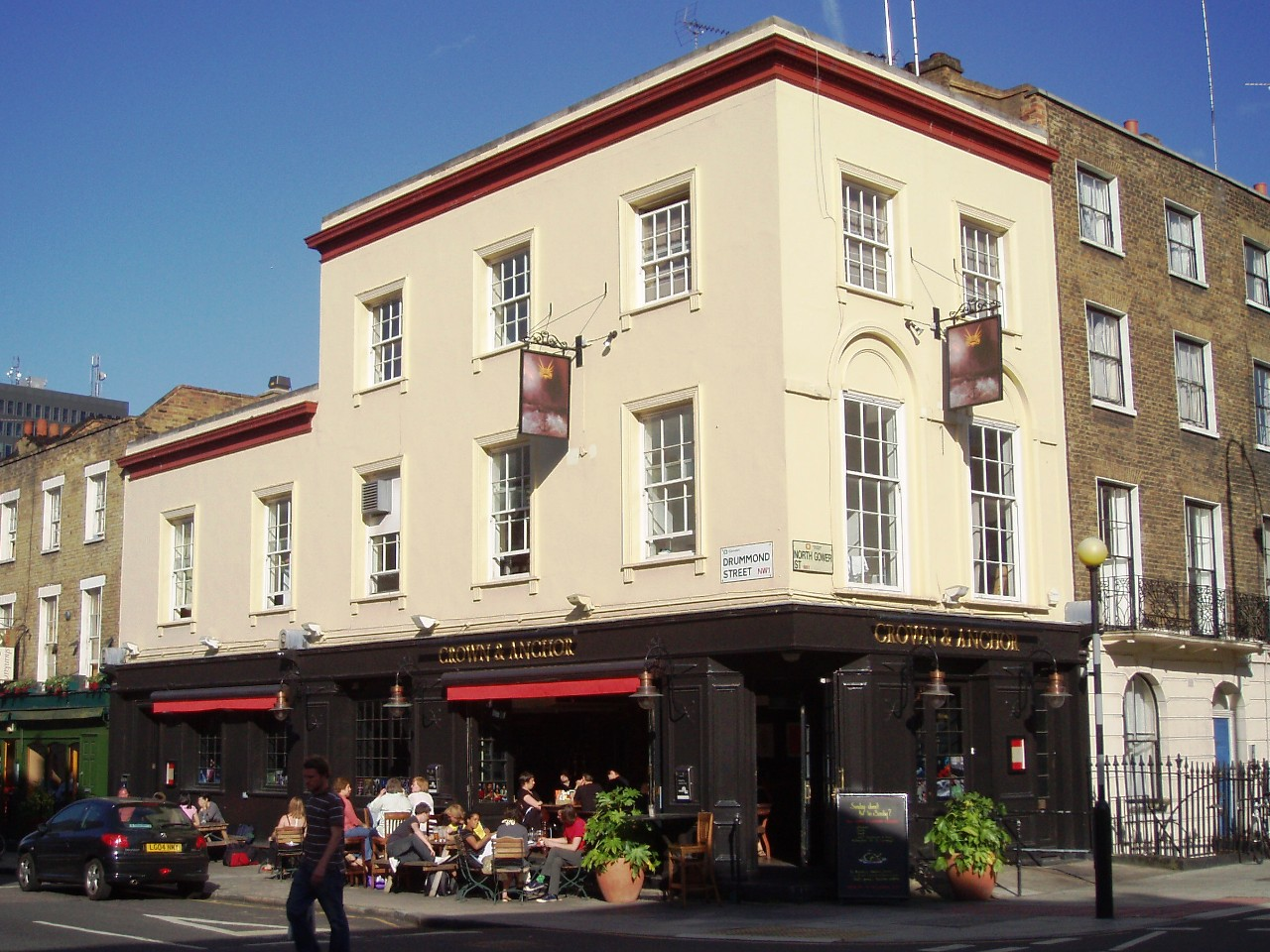
The 19th century Crown and Anchor pub, a listed building

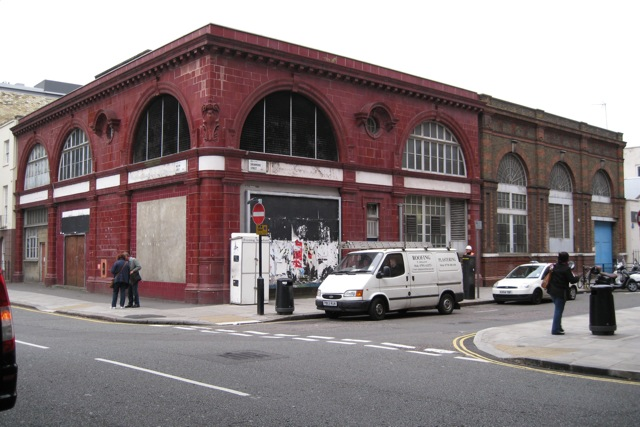
The original (now disused) Euston tube station station building

== Curry houses ==
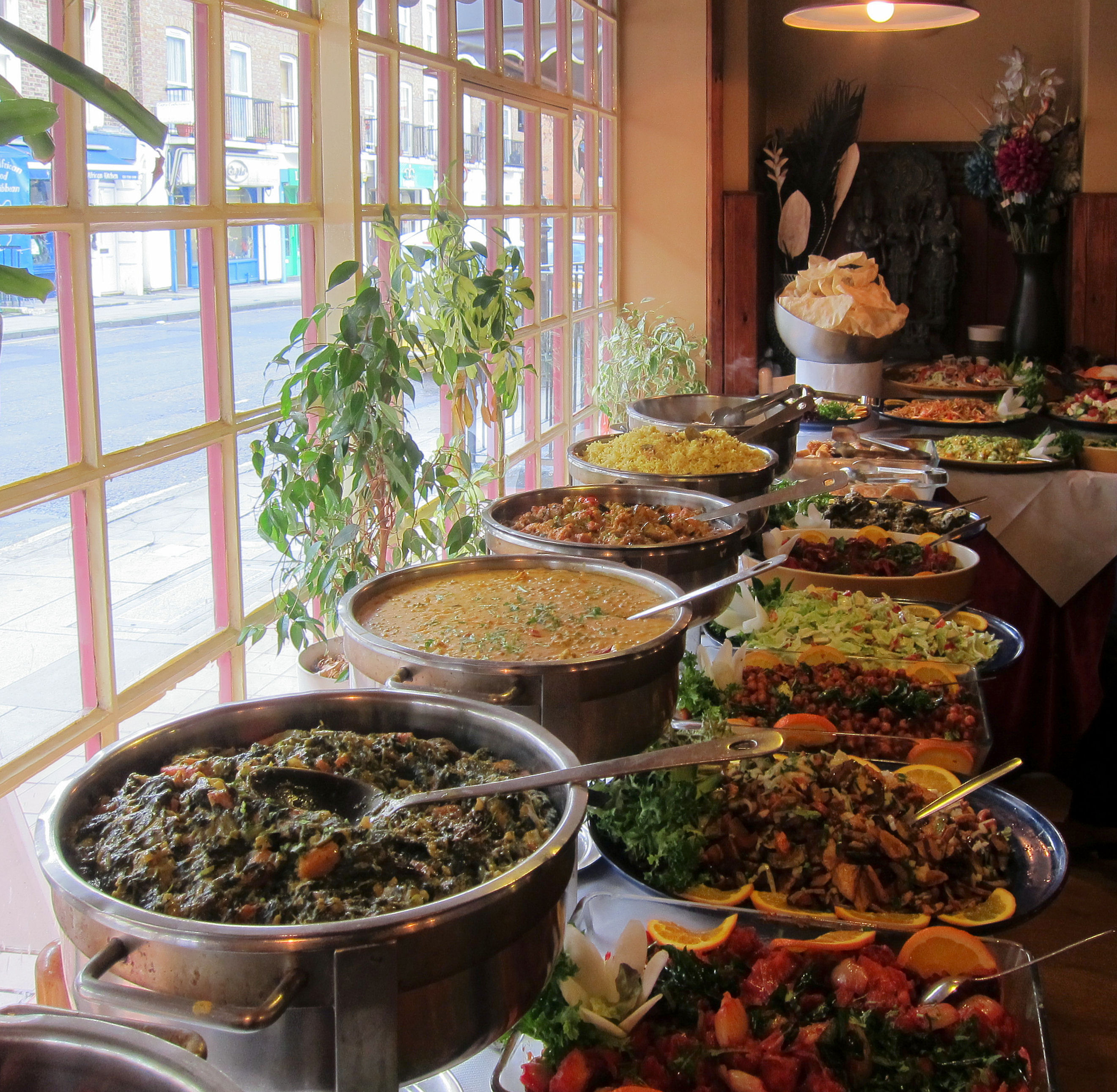
South Indian vegetarian lunch buffet at the Diwana Bhel Poori

Drummond Street is best known for its Indian and Bangladeshi restaurants and supply shops, including Diwana Bhel Poori House which claims to be the oldest South Indian vegetarian restaurant in Britain, having opened in 1970.

In June 2021 an enterprise called the "Drummond Streatery project" was launched to help revive the street's restaurant trade after the disruption caused by the COVID-19 pandemic and the engineering works at the nearby station. The project is a collaboration between Camden London Borough Council and the local business improvement district team, with the involvement of local traders.
