= Japanese noodles =

Type of noodles

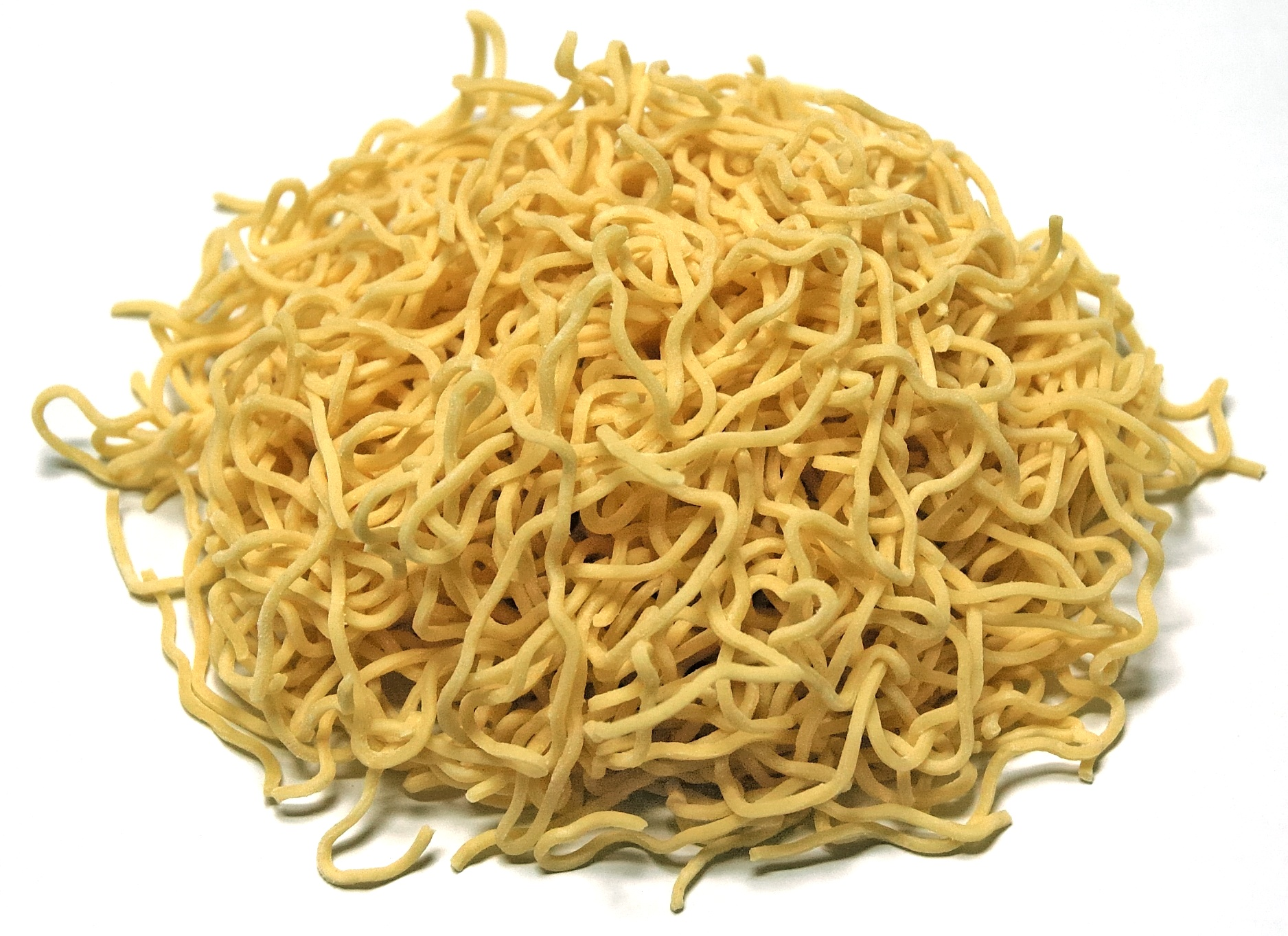
- Fresh ramen
- Type: Noodles
- Place of origin: Japan
- Main ingredients: Flour, water

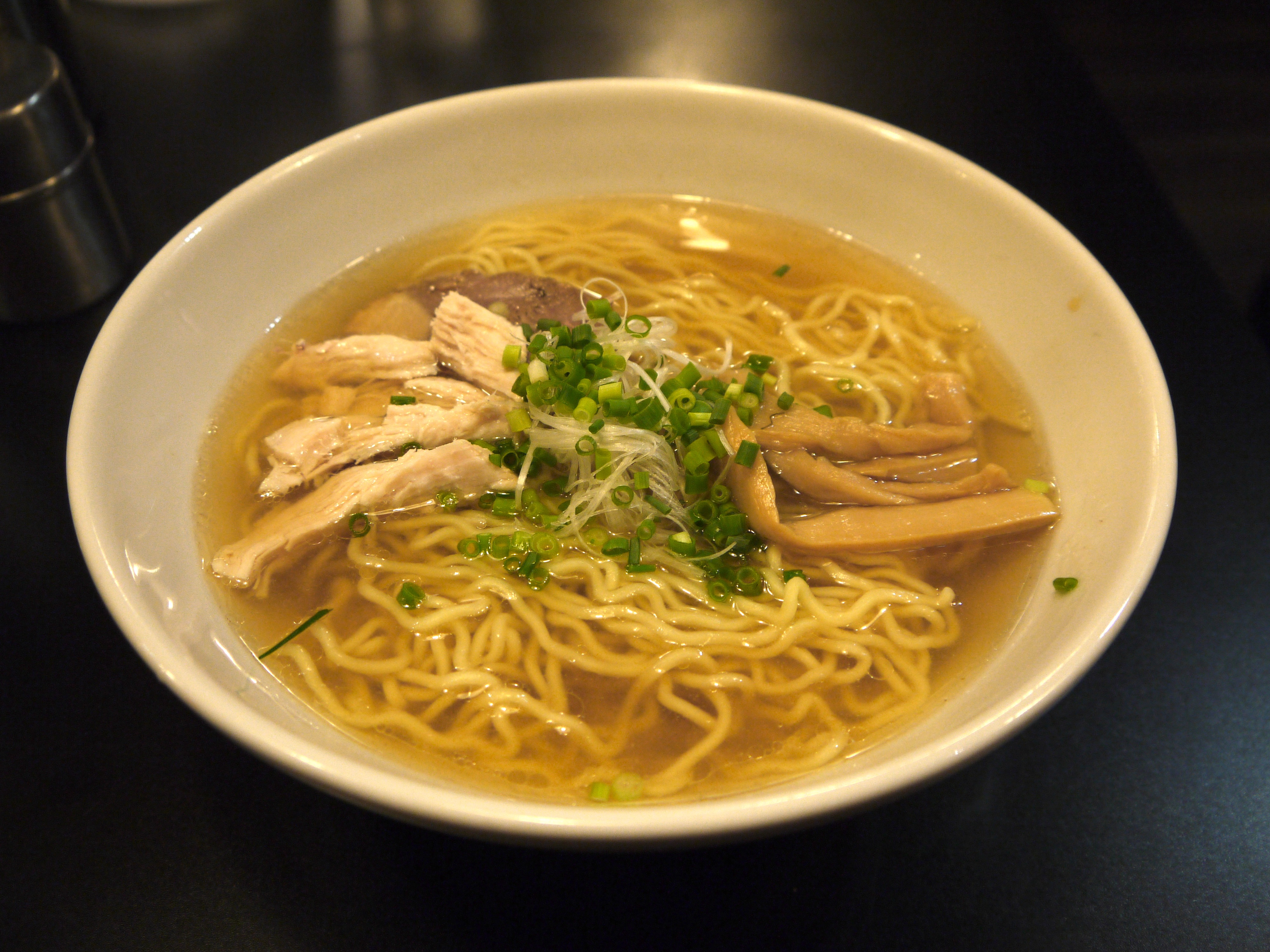
Ramen

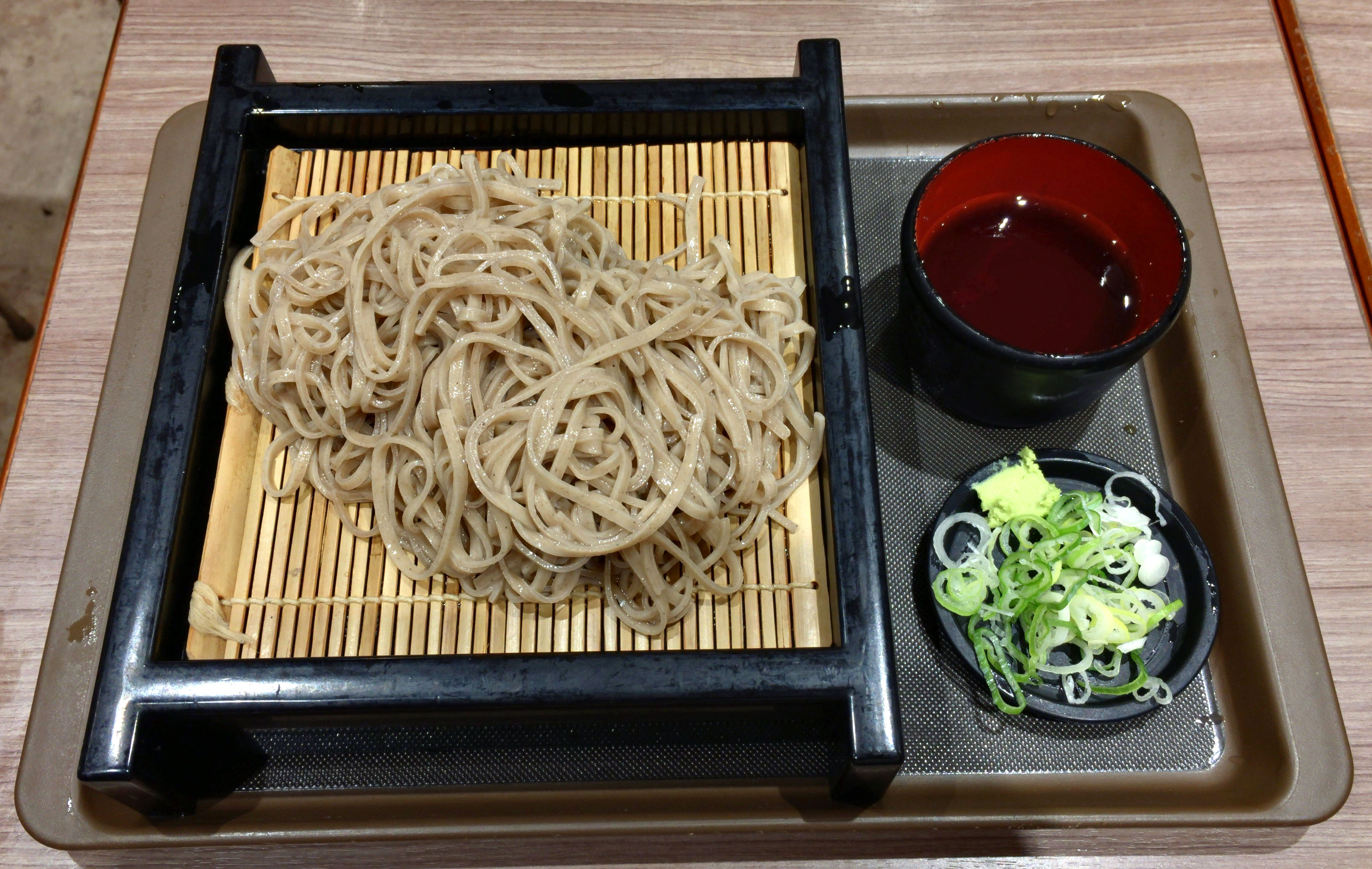
Soba

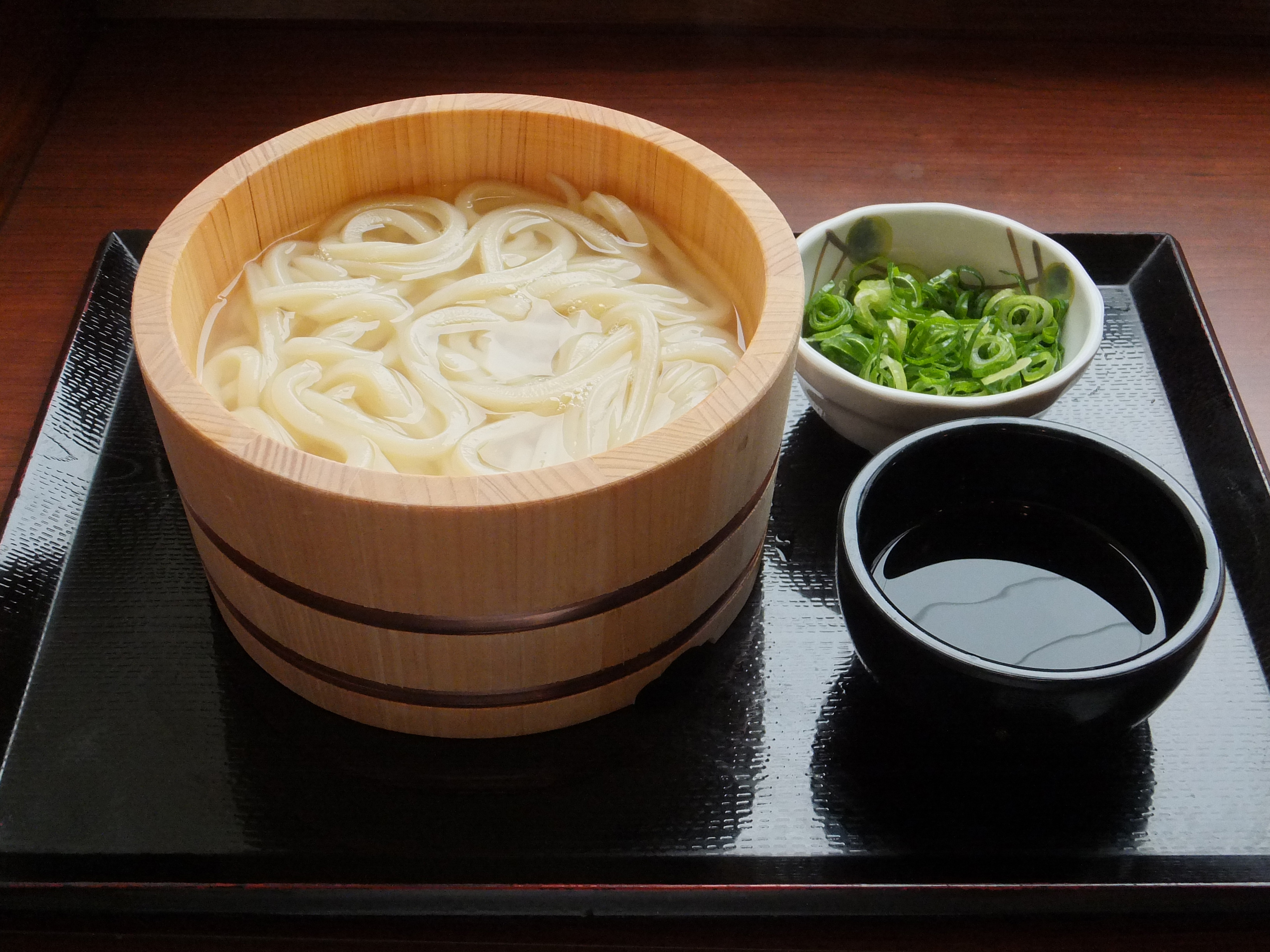
Udon

Noodles are a staple of Japanese cuisine. They are often served chilled with dipping sauces, or in soups or hot dishes. Noodles were introduced to Japan from China during the Song Dynasty between the Heian until the early Kamakura period.

== History ==
Noodles were first introduced into Japan around 800 A.D. during the Heian period (794–1185). This dish was adopted from China.

During the Edo period, specifically between the 1661 to 1672, Soba noodles became popular in restaurants in the capital city of Edo (now Tokyo). It is rumored that it became extremely popular because soba noodles can be served cold, and with all of the fires occurring, the government limited the use of fuel.

== Types of Japanese noodles ==
- Chūkamen are the noodles used in ramen. They are thin, wheat-based noodles made from wheat flour, salt, water, and kansui, a form of alkaline water. The dough is risen before being rolled. Chūkamen have a firm texture and are usually pale yellow in color. The noodles may vary in shape, width, and length. They are served in a broth. The dishes ancestral to ramen were introduced by Chinese immigrants in the 1880s. The word ramen is a Japanese borrowing of the Mandarin Chinese lamian (拉麵, 'pulled noodles'). A common misconception is that ramen is a Japanese adaptation of lamian, but the two dishes have no direct relation, and how ramen came to adopt its name from lamian remains unclear. Ramen evolved from southern Chinese noodle dishes, primarily Cantonese, as opposed to northern Chinese noodle dishes that may feature lamian. Examples of ramen dishes are shōyu ramen, shio ramen, miso ramen, tonkotsu ramen, and curry ramen.
- Shirataki are clear noodles made from konnyaku. These noodles are chewy or rubbery. Shirataki are used to add texture to dishes such as sukiyaki and oden.
- Soba is a noodle made from buckwheat and wheat flour. Soba noodles are available dried or fresh. They may be served with hot broth or cold with dipping sauce (tsuyu). Examples of soba dishes are zaru soba (chilled), kake soba, tempura soba, kitsune soba, and tororo soba. Although the popular Japanese dish yakisoba includes "soba" in its name, the dish is made with Chinese-style noodles (chūkamen).
- Sōmen noodles are a very thin, white, wheat-based noodle. They are usually served chilled in the summertime with dipping sauces although they may be used in soups and other hot dishes. Sōmen noodles are very similar to hiyamugi and udon noodles, only they are thinner (about 1.3mm in width). Sōmen requires oil in its manufacture. During the summer months Japanese consume chilled sōmen to stay cool.
- Hiyamugi are wheat flour noodles similar to sōmen and udon noodles and somewhere in between the two in size. These noodles are often served in the same manner as sōmen and udon noodles. While they are mostly white, there are bundles mixed with noodles of pinkish or brown hues.
- Udon are the thickest of the noodles served in Japanese cuisine. Udon are white, wheat-based noodles, that are 4-6mm in width. These noodles are served chilled with a dipping sauce in the summer months, or in hot dishes and soups when the temperature is cooler. Udon dishes include kitsune udon, Nabeyaki udon, curry udon, and yaki udon. However, sara udon is made using a different kind of noodle which is crispy. There are three nationally recognized regions in Japan known for their udon: Kagawa (Sanuki udon), Gunma (Mizusawa udon), and Akita (Inaniwa udon). These three regions contributed unique recipes of udon, as well as different historical and cultural backgrounds of udon production and consumption. The Kagawa region is considered the "kingdom of Sanuki udon", deemed a symbol of regional identity to revitalize the regional food industry and to promote regional tourism. In the Gunma region, due to the high number of noodle shops serving udon in the surrounding cities (Mizusawa, Kiryu, and Tatebayashi), Gunma was deemed the best place where visitors can experience the best locally produced udon noodle in Japan.
- Harusame are glass noodles made from potato starch. These types of noodles are commonly used in hotpot dishes and salads, and used to create Japanese adaptations of Korean and Chinese noodle dishes. Harusame dishes include harusame salad, which is a cold noodle salad that features three main ingredients of julienned cucumbers, ham, and carrots. Other ingredients can include wakame seaweed, shredded egg omelette, tomatoes, bean sprouts, and more.
- Tokoroten are jelly-like slices made of kanten, which comes from the gelatin of the tengusa, a native seaweed. This dish was usually a summertime dish as it was composed of about 98% water. Tokoroten dates back to 1658 when an innkeeper discarded some strips of kanten, which dried out and could be stored and preserved. The dish is typically garnished with soy sauce as well as rice vinegar.

== See also ==
- Champon, a noodle soup of Japanese-Chinese origin
- Chinese noodles
- Instant noodles
- Korean noodles
- List of noodle dishes
- List of noodles
- Sapporo Ichiban
- Yakisoba, a popular noodle dish
