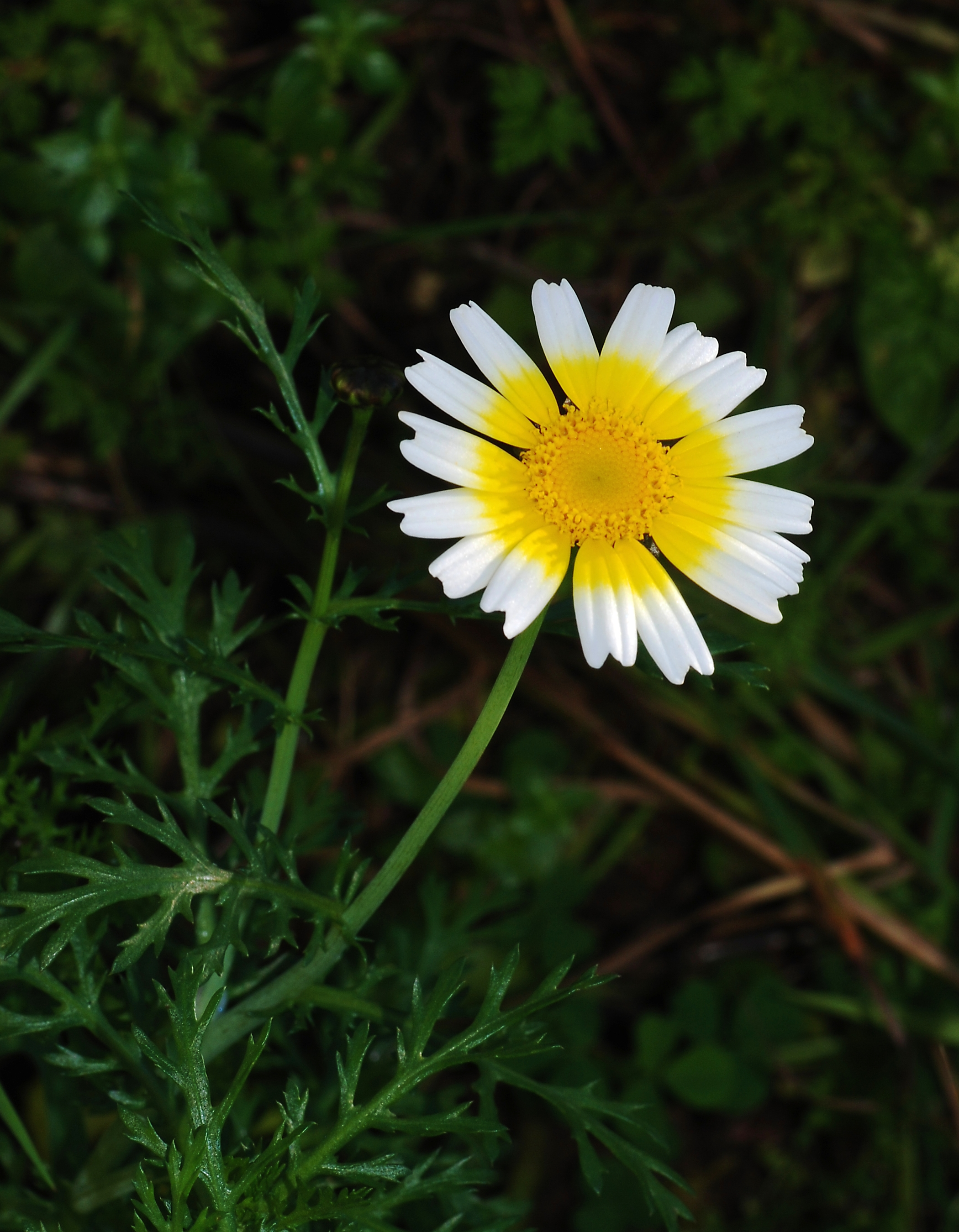

Scientific classification
- Kingdom: Plantae
- Clade: Embryophytes
- Clade: Tracheophytes
- Clade: Spermatophytes
- Clade: Angiosperms
- Clade: Eudicots
- Clade: Asterids
- Order: Asterales
- Family: Asteraceae
- Genus: Glebionis
- Species: G. coronaria

Binomial name
- Glebionis coronaria (L.) Cass. ex Spach

Synonyms
- List: Buphthalmum oleraceum Lour.; Chamaemelum coronarium (L.) E.H.L.Krause; Chrysanthemum breviradiatum Hort. ex DC.; Chrysanthemum coronarium L.; Chrysanthemum coronatum Dum.Cours.; Chrysanthemum merinoanum Pau; Chrysanthemum roxburghii Desf. ex Cass.; Chrysanthemum senecioides Dunal ex DC.; Chrysanthemum spatiosum (L.H.Bailey) L.H.Bailey; Chrysanthemum speciosum Brouss. ex Pers.; Dendranthema coronarium (L.) M.R.Almeida; Glebionis coronaria (L.) Tzvelev; Glebionis roxburghii (Desf. ex Cass.) Tzvelev; Matricaria coronaria (L.) Desr.; Pinardia coronaria (L.) Less.; Pinardia roxburghii (Desf. ex Cass.) Less.; Pyrethrum indicum Roxb.; Pyrethrum roxburghii Desf.; Xanthophthalmum coronarium (L.) P.D.Sell; Xanthophthalmum coronarium (L.) Trehane ex Cullen

= Glebionis coronaria =

Garland chrysanthemum

Species of flowering plant

Glebionis coronaria, formerly called Chrysanthemum coronarium, is a species of flowering plant in the family Asteraceae. It is native to the Mediterranean region. It is cultivated and naturalized in East Asia and in scattered locations in North America.

Glebionis coronaria is used as a leaf vegetable. English language common names include garland chrysanthemum, chrysanthemum greens, edible chrysanthemum, crowndaisy chrysanthemum, chop suey greens, crown daisy, and Japanese greens.

Glebionis coronaria has been hybridized with related Argyranthemum species to create cultivars of garden marguerites.

== Characteristics ==
A leafy herb, the garland chrysanthemum is an annual plant. It has yellow ray florets grouped in small flower heads and aromatic, bipinnately lobed leaves. Its seeds are ribbed and winged cypselae. The vegetable grows very well in mild or slightly cold climates, but will go quickly into premature flowering in warm summer conditions. Seeds are sown in early spring and fall.

"The plant is rich in minerals and vitamins with potassium concentrations at 610 mg/100 g and carotene at 3.4 g/100 g in edible portions. In addition, the plant contains various antioxidants (in stem, leaf, and root tissues) that have potential long-term benefits for human health, although toxic (dioxin) properties have also been observed. Extracts from C. coronarium var. spatiosum have been shown to inhibit growth of Lactobacillus casei, a beneficial human intestinal bacterium."

== Culinary uses ==
Garland chrysanthemum, raw
Nutritional value per 100 g (3.5 oz)
- Energy: 99 kJ (24 kcal)
- Carbohydrates: 3.02 g
- Dietary fiber: 3 g
- Fat: 0.56 g
- Protein: 3.36 g
Vitamins and minerals
Vitamins	Quantity %DV^{†}
Vitamin A equiv. beta-Carotene lutein zeaxanthin	13% 116 μg 13% 1380 μg 3834 μg
Thiamine (B1)	11% 0.13 mg
Riboflavin (B2)	11% 0.144 mg
Niacin (B3)	3% 0.531 mg
Pantothenic acid (B5)	4% 0.221 mg
Vitamin B6	10% 0.176 mg
Folate (B9)	44% 177 μg
Vitamin C	2% 1.4 mg
Vitamin K	292% 350 μg
Minerals	Quantity %DV^{†}
Calcium	9% 117 mg
Iron	13% 2.29 mg
Magnesium	8% 32 mg
Manganese	41% 0.943 mg
Sodium	5% 118 mg
Zinc	6% 0.71 mg
- Link to USDA Database entry
- ^{†}Percentages estimated using US recommendations for adults.

The plant's greens are used in many Asian cuisines. Normally only the greens are consumed but the stronger tasting stalk can also be used. They can be simmered, steamed, stir fried, deep fried, or added to soups. When overcooked they can become bitter.

In Korean cuisine, the plant is called ssukgat (쑥갓) and is used as an ingredient in various soups and stews, as well as a side dish (namul).

In Chinese cuisine, it is called tóng hāo cài (茼蒿菜) in Mandarin, and tong ho choy in Cantonese. It is used as an ingredient for stir-fries, stews, casseroles, and hotpots. In traditional food culture it is seen as "warming" and thus was primarily eaten when it was cold.

In Japanese cuisine, it is called shungiku (春菊 "spring chrysanthemum"), and is used in nabemono, mixed into rice, or drizzled with soy sauce and sesame seeds as a side dish. It is also commonly added to sukiyaki.

In Vietnamese cuisine, the greens are known as cải cúc or tần ô, and are used in soup (canh) or as a side dish accompanying various noodle soups. In a hotpot, it is added at the last moment to the pot to avoid overcooking.

In Crete, a variety of the species called mantilida (μαντηλίδα) has its tender shoots eaten raw or steamed by the locals (see Greek cuisine).

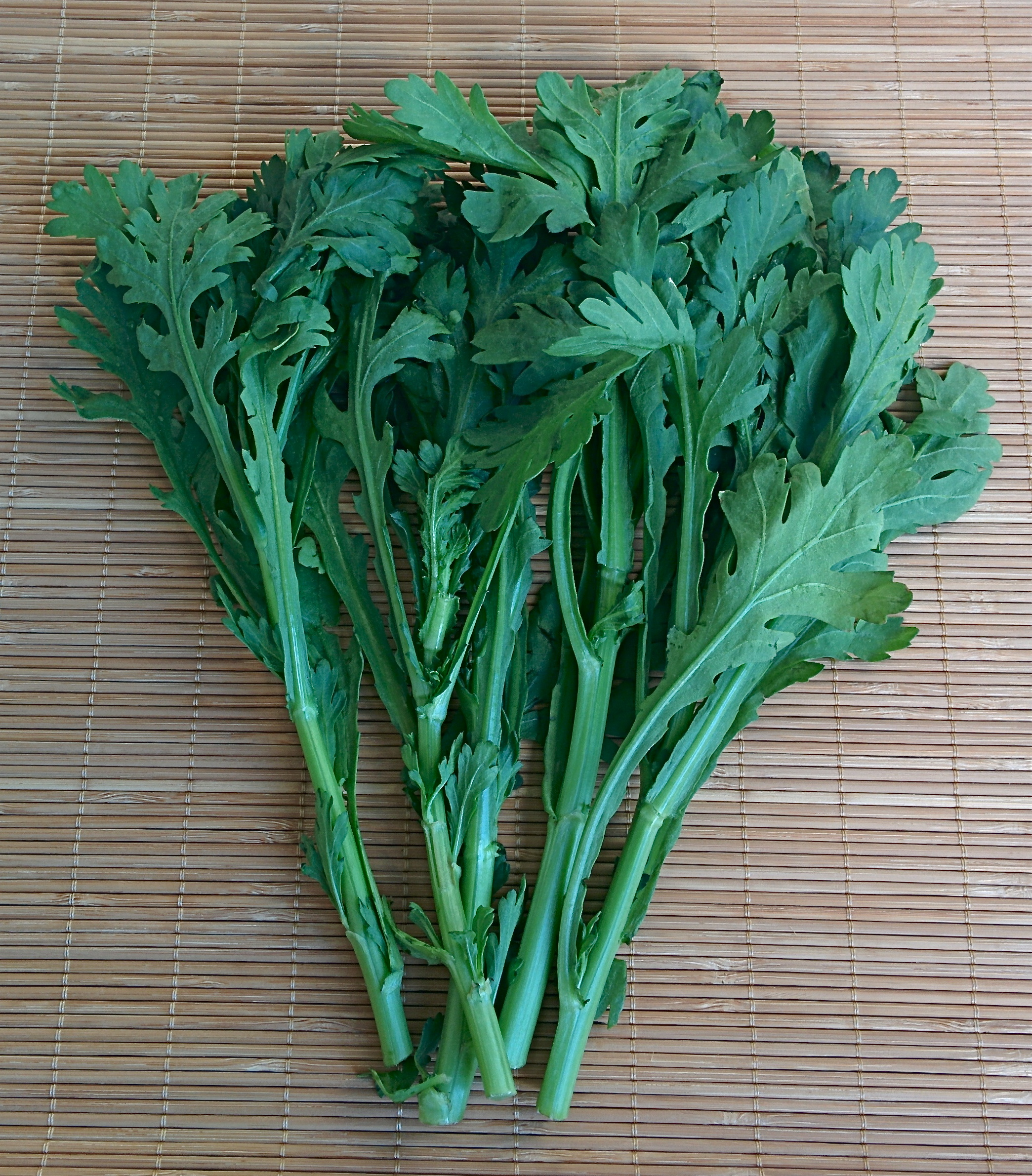
Edible crown daisy leaves

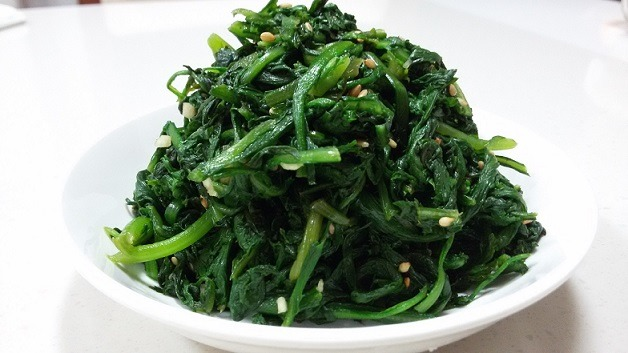
Korean ssukgat-namul (seasoned crown daisy side dish)

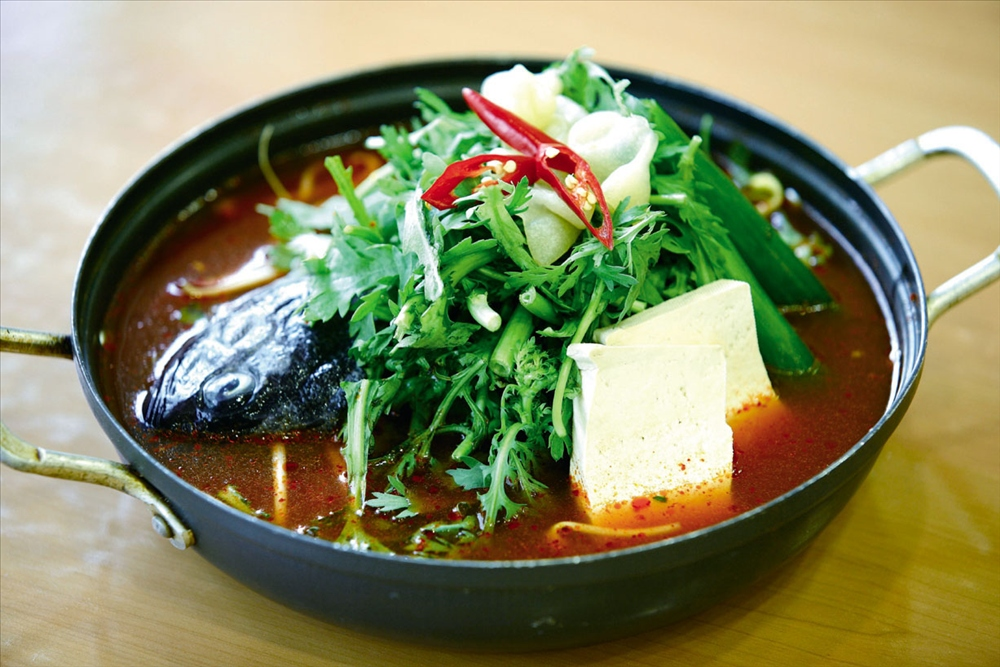
Korean maeuntang (spicy fish soup) with crown daisy

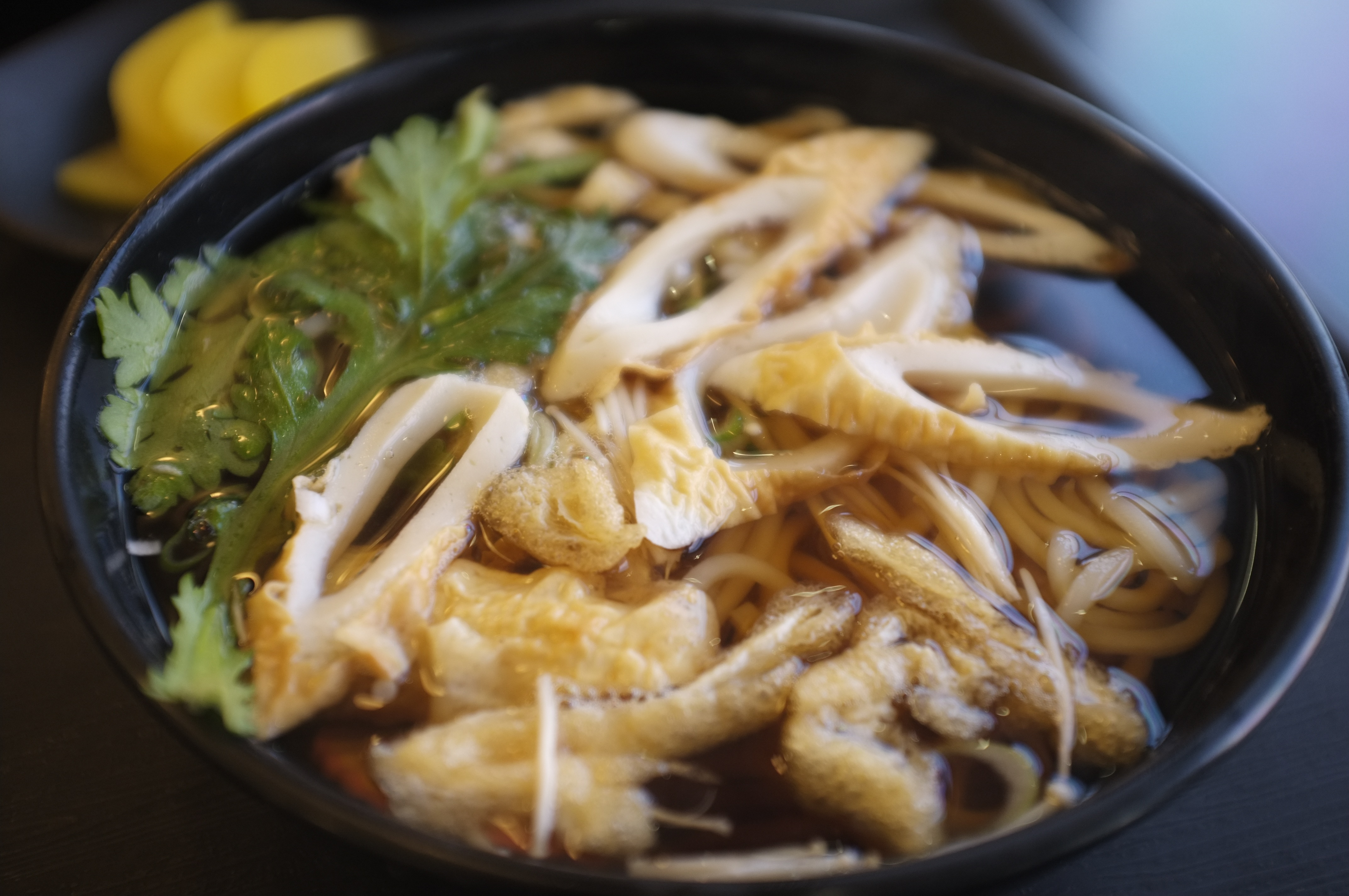
Korean udong noodles with crown daisy and eomuk (fish cakes)

== Gallery ==
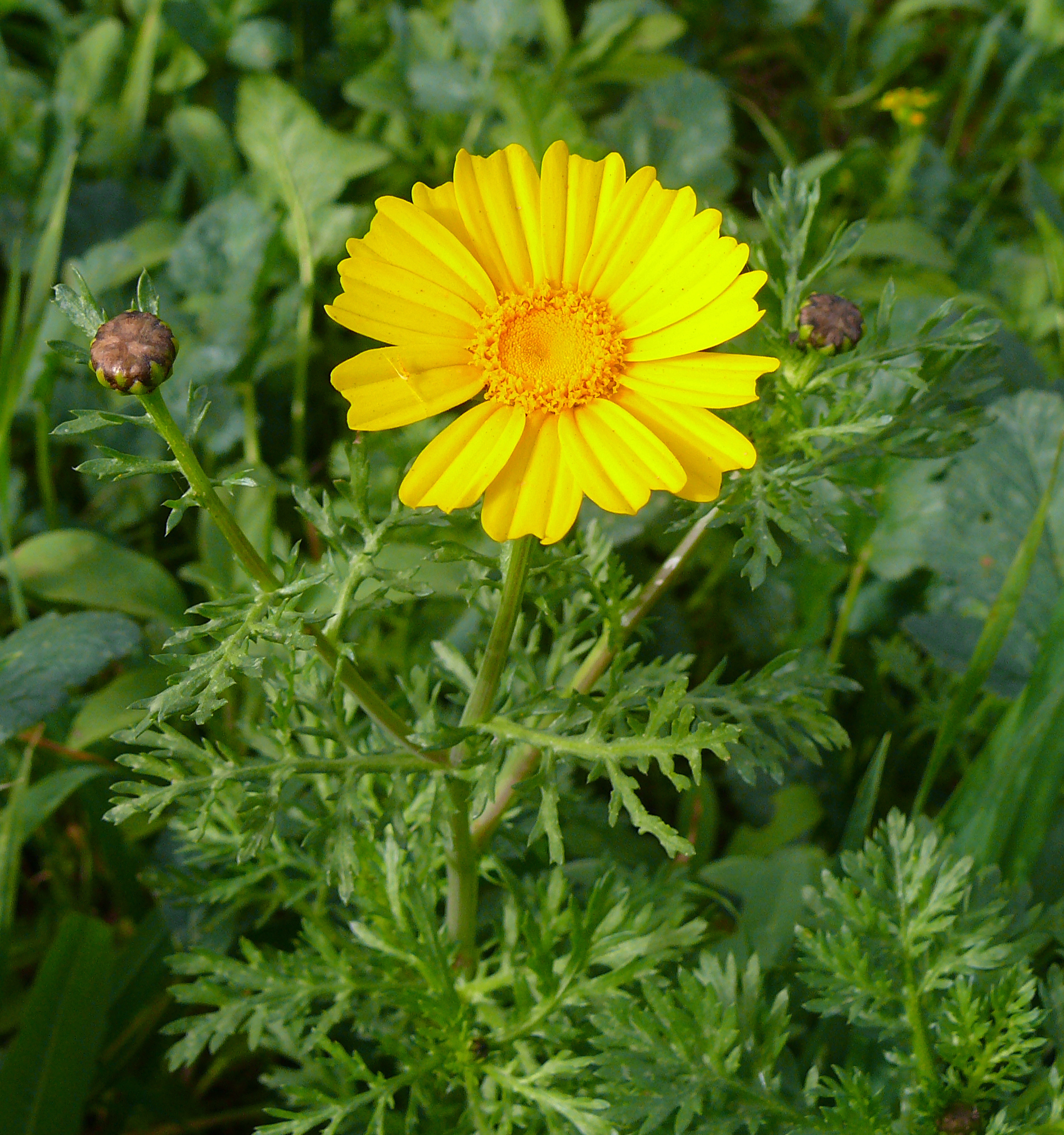
Crown daisy flower

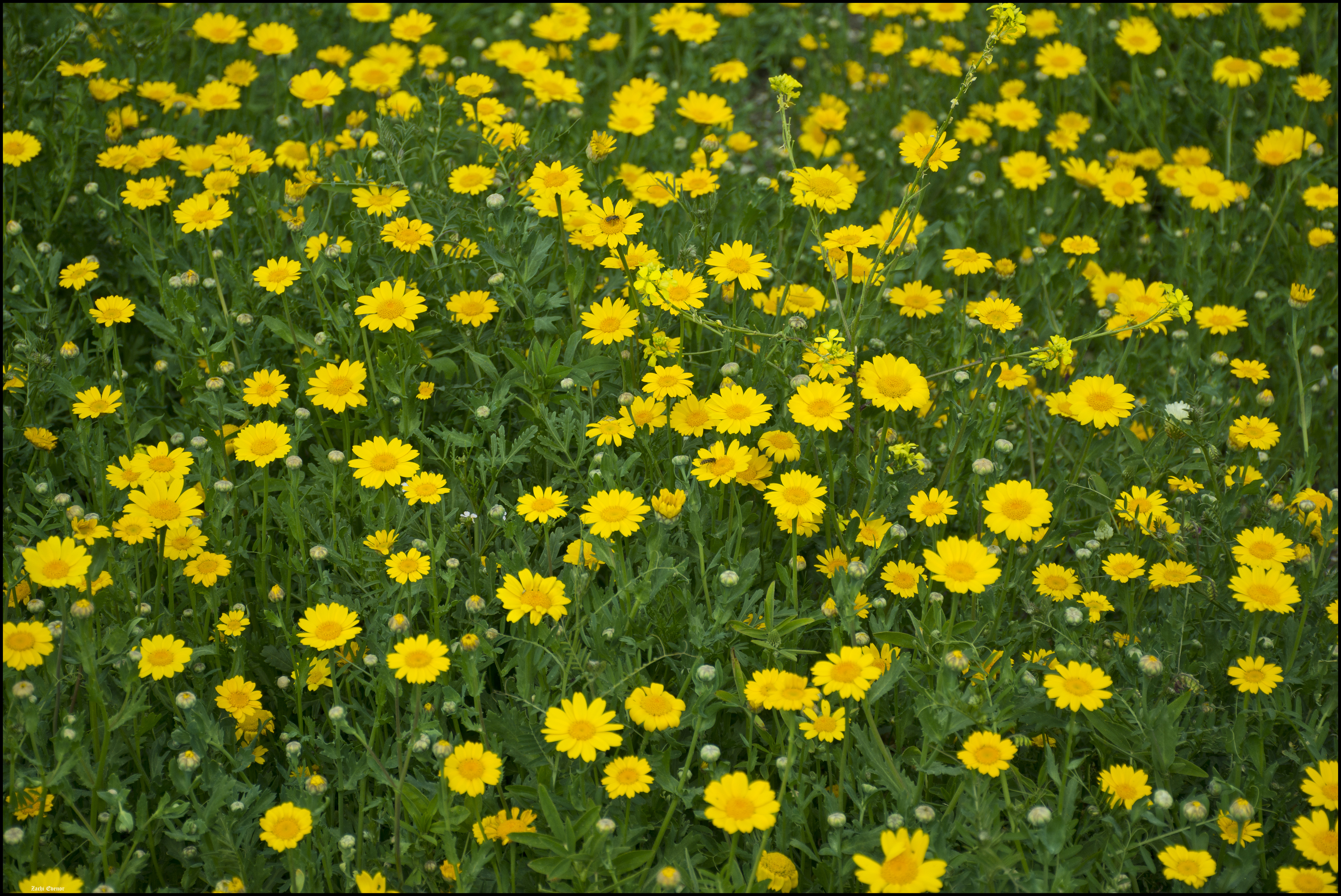
Crown daisies in blossom

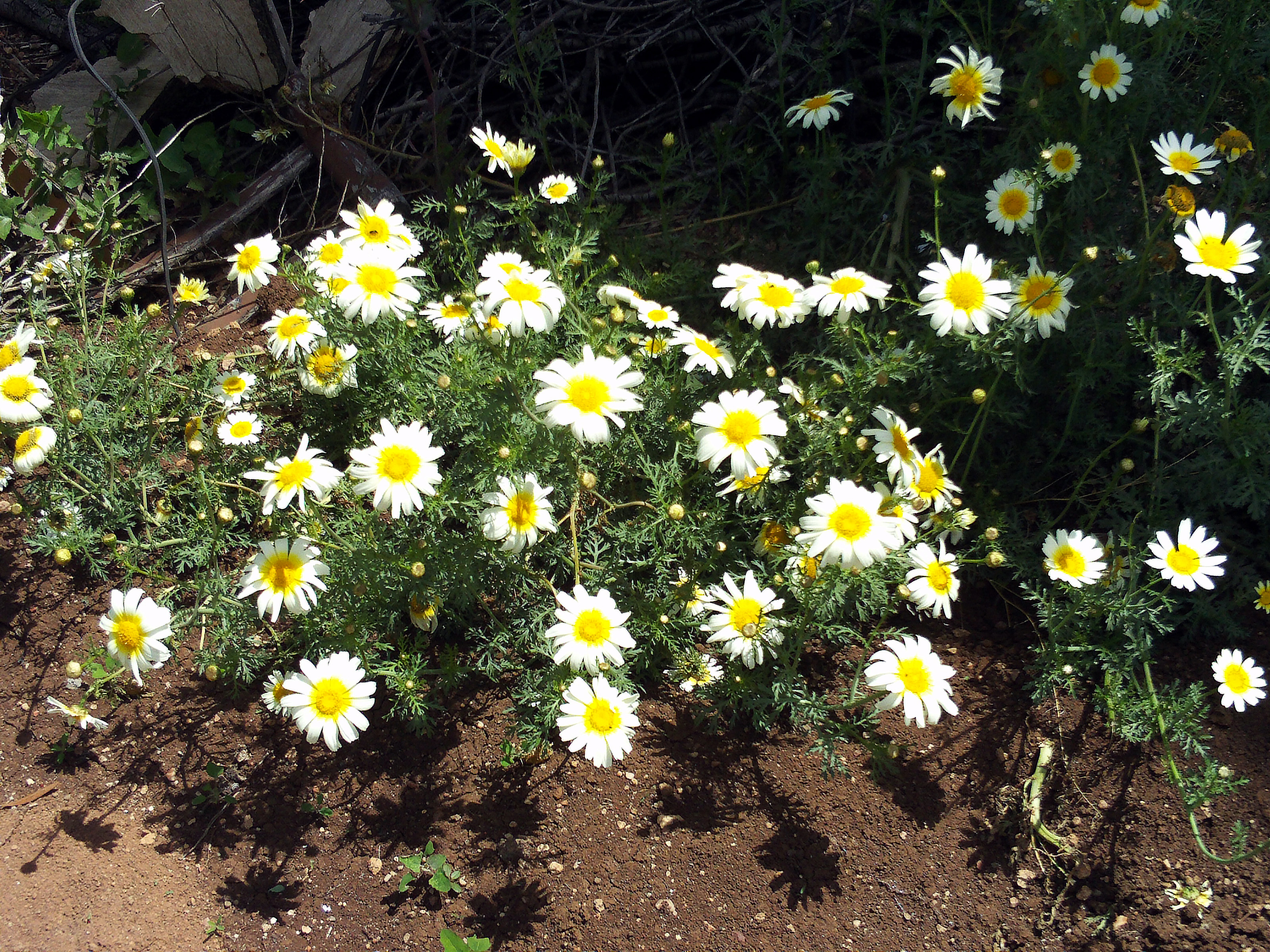
Habit

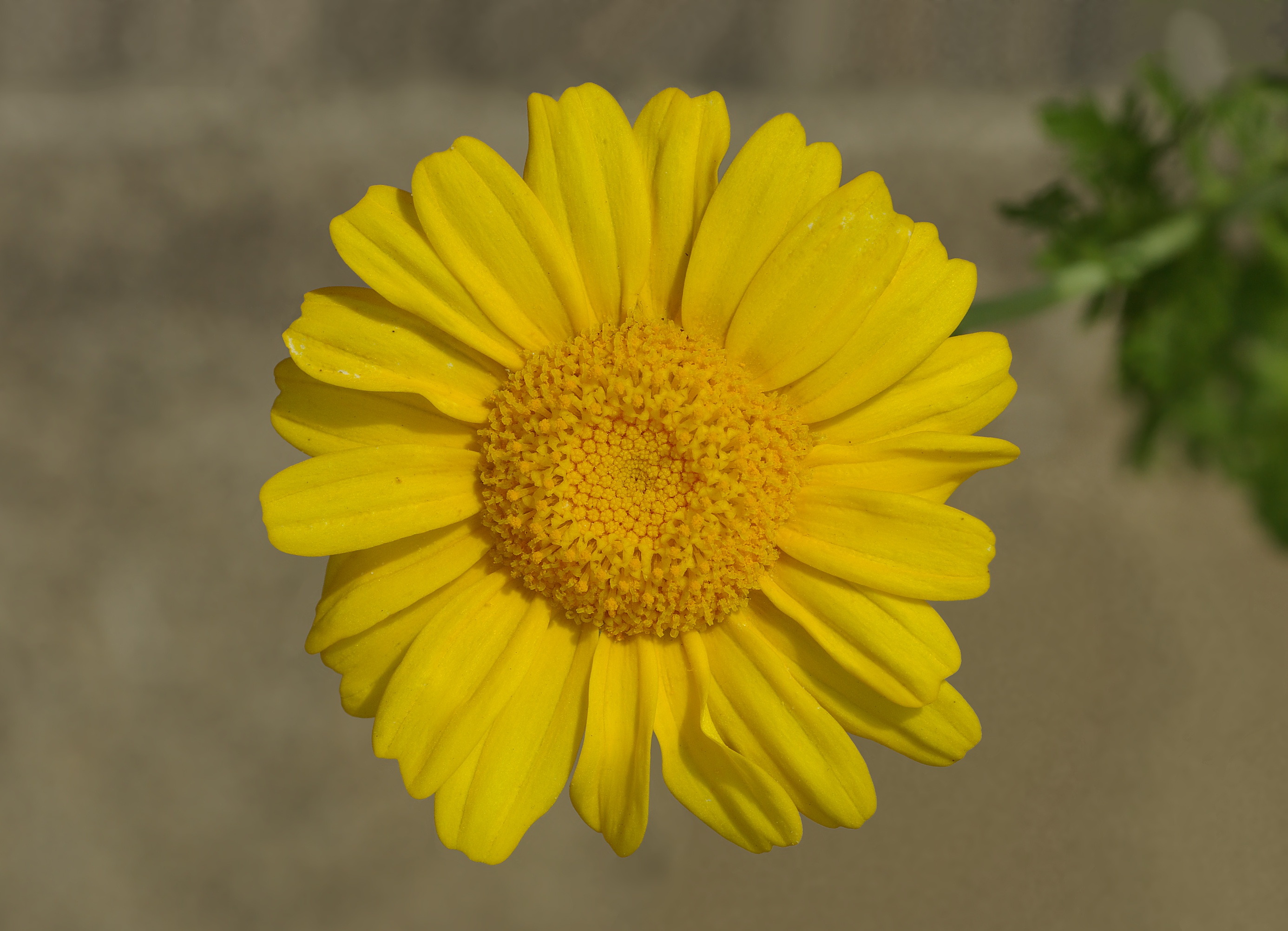
All-yellow form

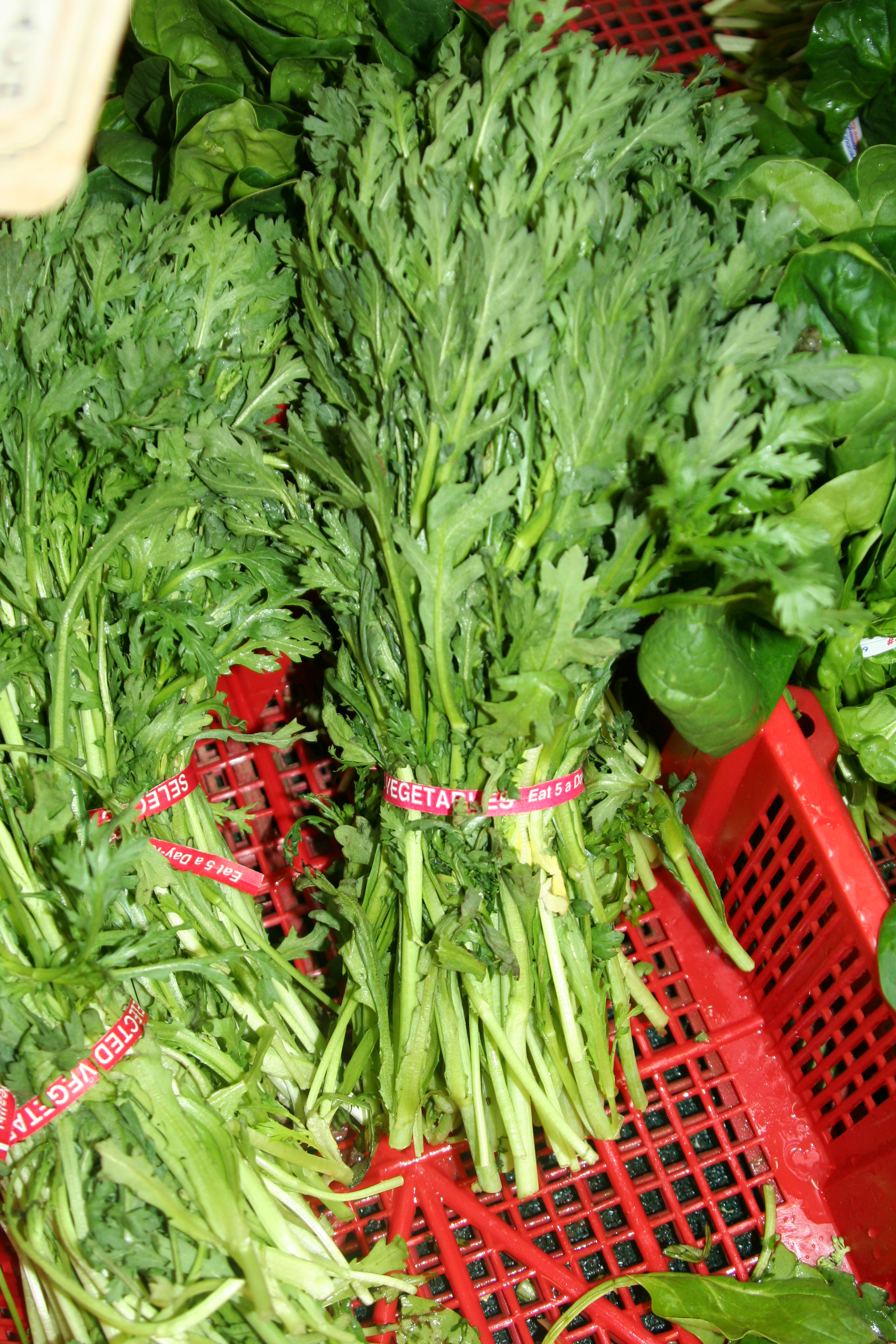
As a vegetable

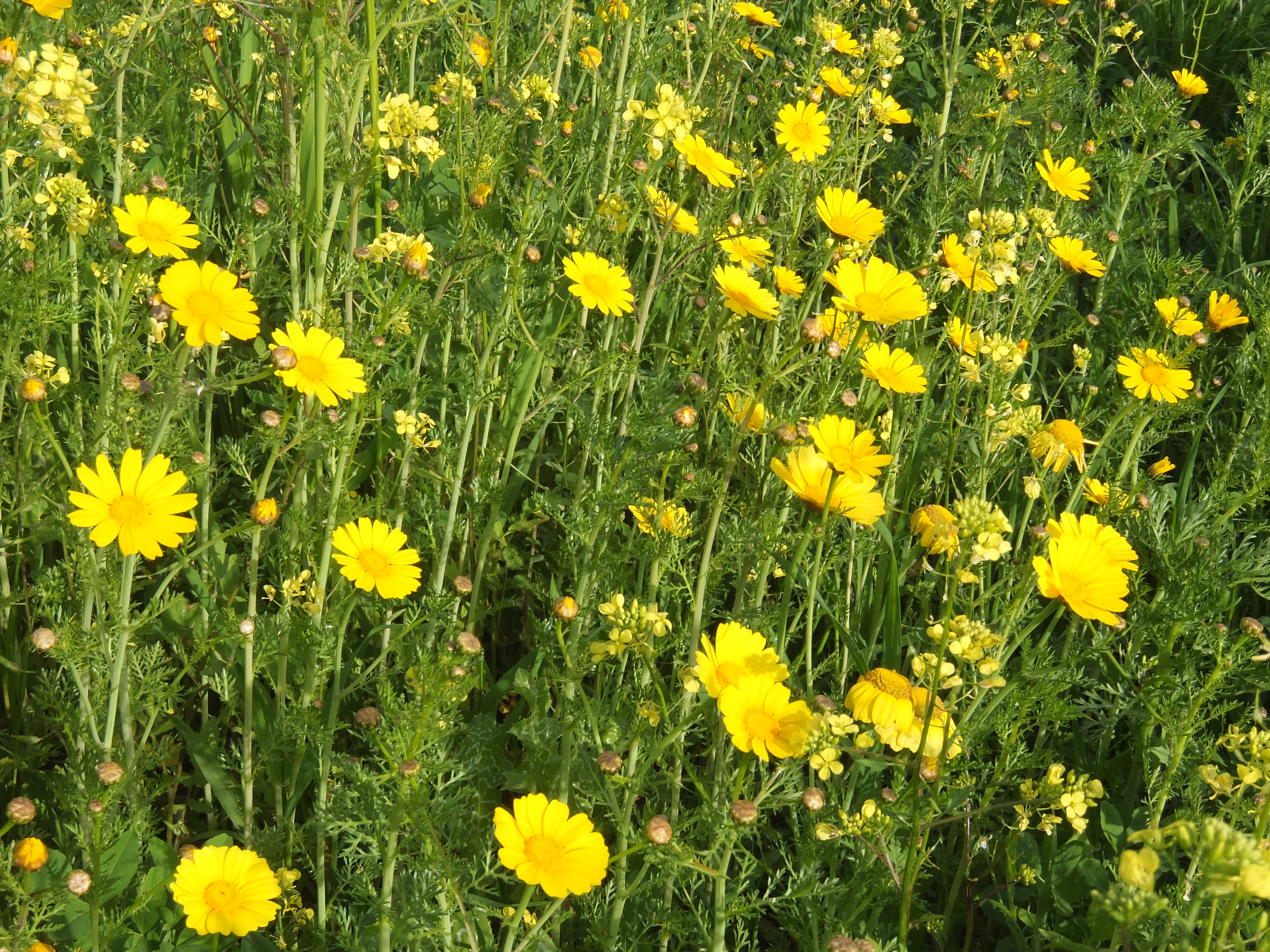
Field of Crown daisies

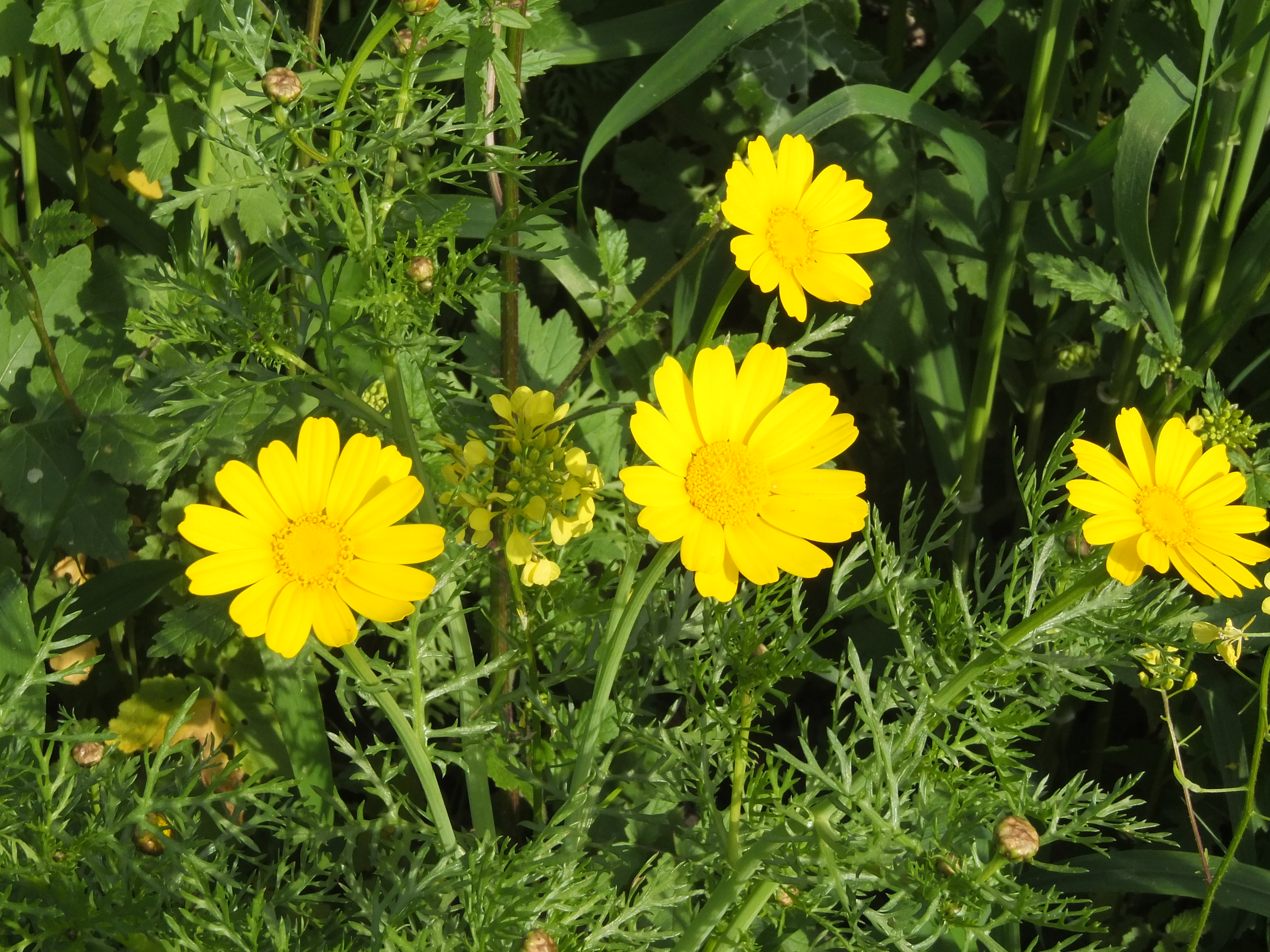
Crown daisies in blossom

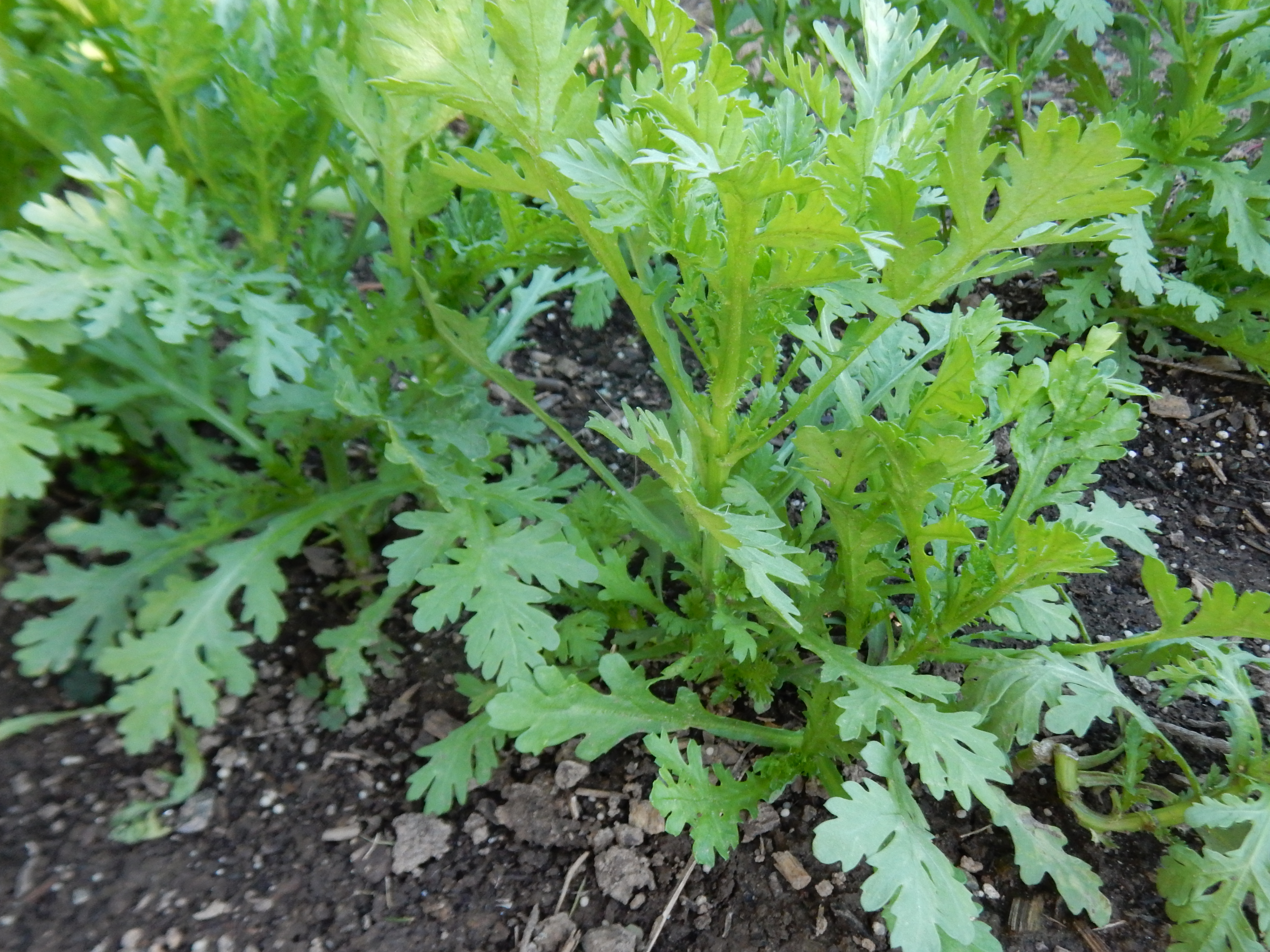
Leaves of G. coronaria 'Oasis'
