= Sanuki udon =

Style of Udon

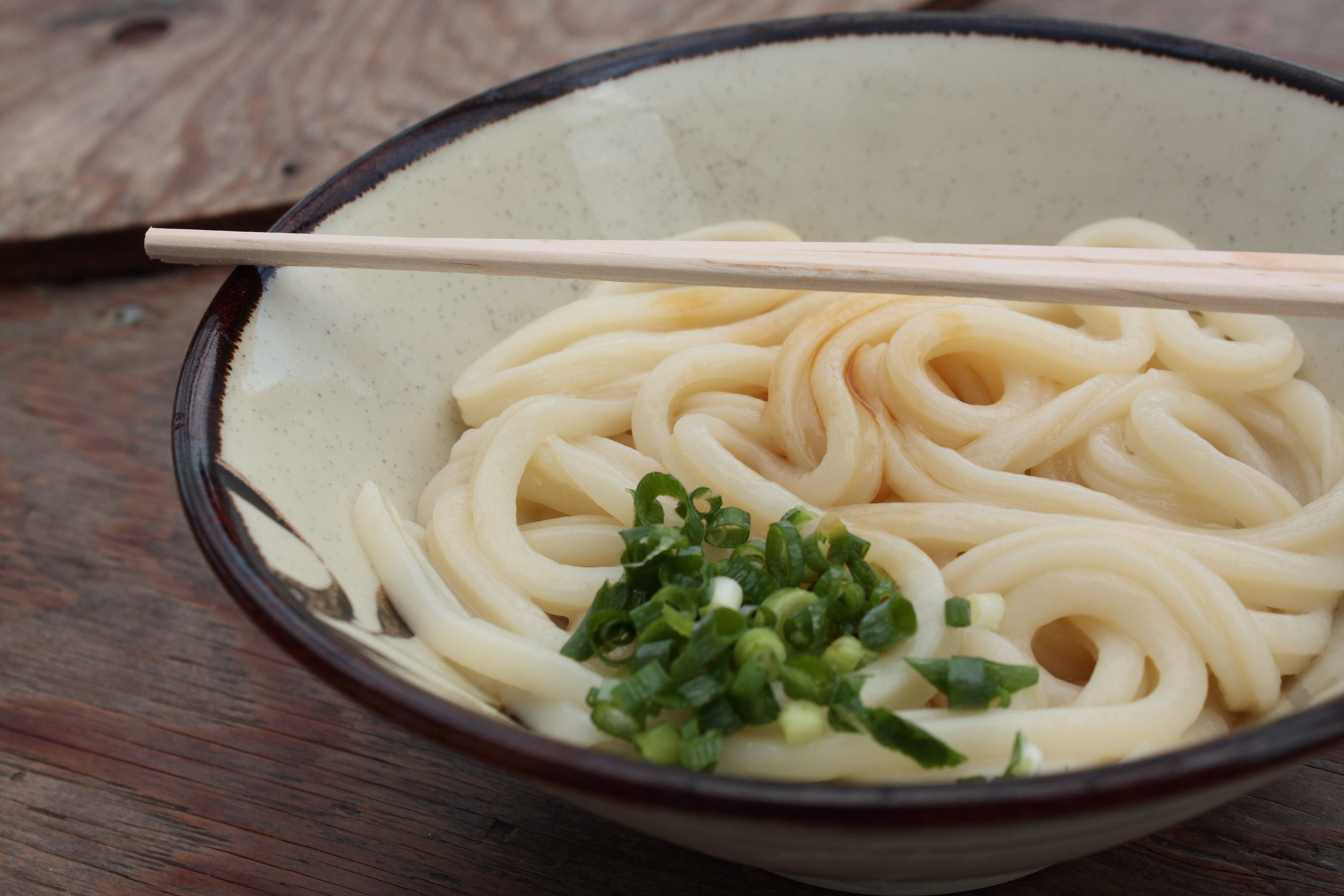
- Type: Japanese noodles (udon)
- Place of origin: Japan
- Region or state: Kagawa Prefecture
- Main ingredients: Wheat flour, salt

Sanuki udon (讃岐うどん) is an udon noodle dish most popular in the Kagawa prefecture in Japan, but is now easily found throughout the neighboring Kansai region and much of Japan. It is characterized by its square shape and flat edges with rather chewy texture, and in an authentic sense, ingredients should be from among those local specialties as wheat flour, Niboshi dried young sardines to cook broth for soup and dipping sauce. Many udon shops now specialize solely in sanuki-style chewy udon, and are usually identified by the text "sanuki" in hiragana (さぬき) appearing in the name of the shop or on the sign.

It is usually served as noodle soup or kamaage (udon) in which the noodles are served in plain hot water and eaten with dipping sauce. Originally popularized in the Kagawa Prefecture of Japan, nowadays various types of dashi is applied to the broth outside of Kagawa which varies in strength and flavor across Japan, such as made with more costly Katsuobushi.

Sanuki udon are named after Sanuki Province, which is the old name of Kagawa Prefecture. It has been featured in the 2016 anime, Poco's Udon World.

== Overview ==
=== Branding origin ===
Udon is a particularly popular dish in Kagawa prefecture.

As of 2016, along with soba, the prefecture had the highest amount of such noodle shops per capita in all of Japan, as well as the highest wheat usage for udon noodles.

Sanuki udon is a successful example of regional branding, as it has brought benefits such as increases in tourism, local udon production, and increased name recognition and attention.

It was selected as first place out of 350 commodities in terms of regional branding strength in biennial surveys by Nikkei Research in 2008 and 2010. Tourists cite udon as both the primary reason for coming to Kagawa prefecture as well as its charm. In 2011, the "Udon Prefecture" tourism campaign was launched by the Kagawa prefectural government and the Kagawa Tourism Association.

Since long ago, quality wheat flour, salt, soy sauce, and dried sardines known locally as 'iriko' have been local specialties of Sanuki Province (now Kagawa Prefecture), which were easy ingredients to obtain for udon.

=== Current status in Kagawa ===
Udon holds a strong cultural significance in Kagawa. In terms of udon production (boiled, raw, dried, and other forms found from the Kagawa Prefecture Agriculture Production Distribution survey), output has changed over the past 20 years. During the 1980s, udon production increased from approximately 10,000 to 20,000 tons. In the 1990s, production rose from just over 30,000 tons to nearly 40,000 tons, and during the 2000s, it grew from below 50,000 to around 60,000 tons. In 2009, Kagawa was ranked first in the country for udon production at 59,643 tons (wheat flour consumption), more than double the amount of Saitama, the second-ranked prefecture for udon production. Kagawa’s share of the domestic market has increased from 5% in 1980 to 25% over the next 25 years.

A survey conducted on residents found that 90.5% consume udon at least once a week. Of those people, 50.8% of people reported eating once a week, and only 9.5% of people reported not consuming udon at all.

Udon is a primary portion in the local diet of Kagawa residents and is not often promoted as a tourist attraction. Udon shops are widely spread throughout Matsuyama and central Kagawa, with little to no restaurants designated for tourists. Moreover, many residents continue to seek udon even after leaving the prefecture, and prefer to eat it upon their return to provide the feeling of returning home.

=== Customs ===
Several traditional events in Kagawa celebrate udon. For example, Sanuki Udon Day, an event created by the Sanuki Udon Association, is the tradition of eating udon during hangesho, the 11th day after summer solstice (around July 2nd). On New Year’s Eve, a prominent portion of residents choose to eat udon rather than observe the tradition of eating toshikoshi soba, resulting in crowded handmade udon restaurants. Kagawa has constantly been working on new events and promotional activities since 2009, such as toshiage udon.

=== Statistics ===
Change in production output of udon in Kagawa (from the Ministry of Agriculture, Forestry, and Fisheries). Bar section shows production output (tons of wheat flour used), and the line demonstrates Kagawa's market share (percentage).

Increase in number of tourists visiting Kagawa (per 1,000 people).

Top 5 prefectures with the highest udon and soba production output, measured in tons of wheat flour used (2009).

== Name ==
In Japan, there are generally no restrictions on the use of the name “sanuki udon.” The National Fresh Noodles Fair Trade Council and the National Fair Trade Commission states that “the product is the same no matter where it is produced.” For this reason, the name is used in many places throughout Kagawa Prefecture. Until the early 2000s, there was a common preconception that sanuki udon was a product of Kagawa, but a growth in popularity throughout Japan has brought down this preconception.

However, when labeling famous products, authentic products, and local specialties, the following restrictions are observed to maintain fair competition between brands.

Regulations on Labeling Fresh Noodles from the Fair Competition Regulations Table The criteria for displaying famous products, local specialties, authentic products, etc. is as follows.
	Criteria
Sanuki udon	Must be manufactured in Kagawa; Must be a variety of handmade noodles; Water content: 40% or more relative to the wheat flour weight; Salt content: 3% or more relative to the wheat flour weight; Fermentation time: 2 hours or more; When boiled: approximately 15 minutes until gelatinization

Outside of Kagawa, a notable amount of billboards, signs, menus, etc. use the name “sanuki udon” to denote udon with no toppings (known as “kake” or “kayaku” in Kagawa) or other restaurant specialties.

=== Naming concerns ===
As long as fresh noodles are not labeled as a local specialty, authentic product, or famous product, they can freely use the aforementioned title, which has led to some issues in the past regarding. Those issues include the following:

- Distribution of inferior and knockoff products.
- In March 2008, 14 trademarks with the “sanuki udon” name were registered by a local Taiwanese manufacturer. A Taiwanese company that held the rights to said name had previously filed a request for a local Japanese restaurant to stop using the name back in November of 2007. The store owner requested for the Taiwanese Ministry of Economic Affairs’ Intellectual Property Bureau to dispute and invalidate the trademark registration, and in November of 2010, the bureau acknowledged the request and revoked the trademark. The company that held the rights attempted to appeal the decision and file an administrative lawsuit against the store owner, but by December 8, 2011, the court had dismissed 4 of the 14 cases. The other 10 cases were dismissed by August of 2013.
- On July 19, 2011, Kagawa Prefecture announced that the Chinese Trademark Office dismissed a case involving resident from Shanghai, China, in which the resident applied to register a trademark on the "sanuki udon" name. The application was formally rejected by the Trademark Office back in August of 2008.

== History ==
The following information discusses the history of udon in Kagawa.

=== Before the Edo period ===
Sanuki Province was a land with Seto Inland Sea climate, long hours of sunshine, and a flat terrain suitable for growing wheat and other grains. The province was a major granary area since the Nara period where the jōri system saw widespread usage, mainly producing rice.
