= Udon =

Thick noodle made from wheat flour

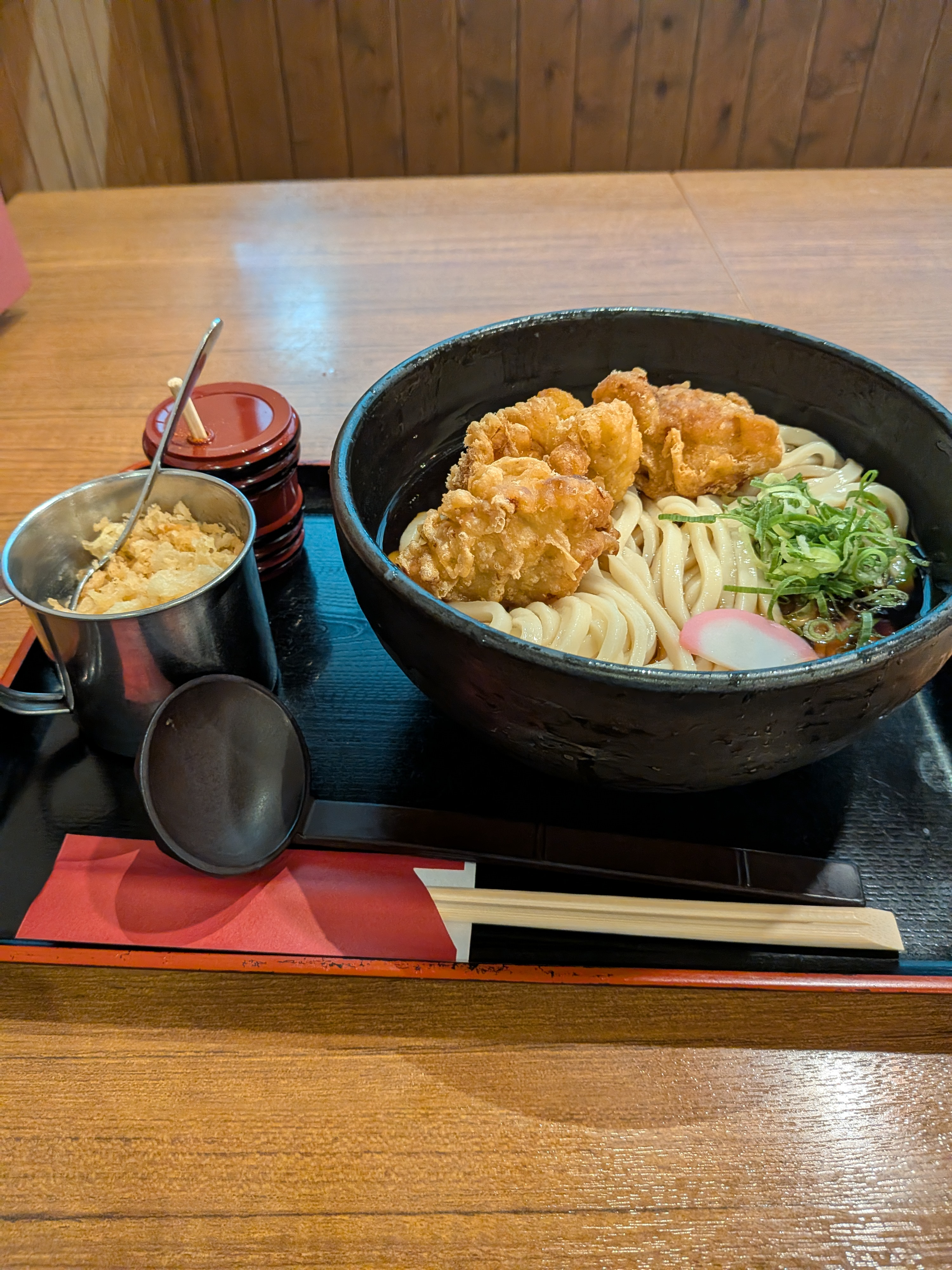
- Type: Noodles
- Place of origin: Japan
- Main ingredients: Wheat flour

Udon (うどん or 饂飩) is a thick noodle made from wheat flour, used in Japanese cuisine. There are a variety of ways it is prepared and served. Its simplest form is in a soup as kake udon with a mild broth called kakejiru made from dashi, soy sauce, and mirin. It is usually topped with thinly chopped scallions. Other common toppings include prawn tempura, kakiage (mixed tempura fritter), abura-age (sweet, deep-fried tofu pouches), kamaboko (sliced fish cake), and shichimi spice added to taste.

Standard broth differs by region. Dark (koikuchi) soy sauce is added in northern Japan, while light (usukuchi) soy sauce is added in the south. Instant noodles are often sold in two (or more) versions accordingly.

More unusual variants include stir-fried yaki udon and curry udon made with Japanese curry. Udon is often used as the final dish in shabu shabu or Japanese hot pot.

== Dishes ==
Udon noodles are cooked before eating, usually by boiling in water. Different types of udon are produced to suit different ways of serving them. Udon noodles are usually served chilled in the summer and hot in the winter. In the Edo period, only the thicker wheat noodle was generally called udon, and was served with a hot broth called nurumugi (温麦). The thinner variety, served chilled, was called hiyamugi (冷麦).

For cold udon, or udon salad, the noodles are usually mixed with usuyaki-tamago, shredded chicken, and fresh vegetables such as cucumber and radish. Toppings of udon soup are chosen to reflect the seasons. Most of the soup toppings are added without cooking them much, although deep-fried tempura is sometimes added. In many of these dishes, udon noodles can be replaced with soba.

=== Hot ===
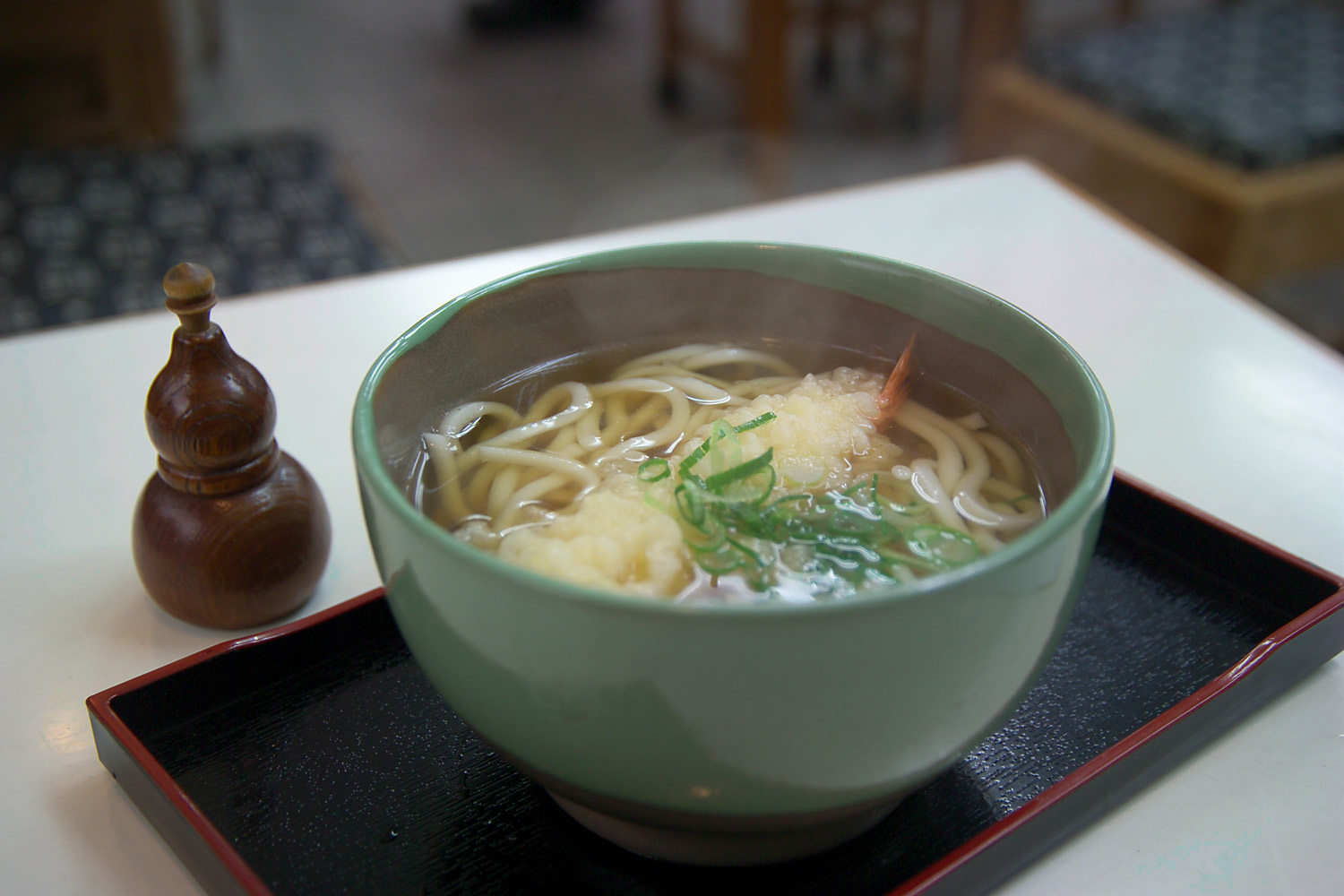
Tempura udon

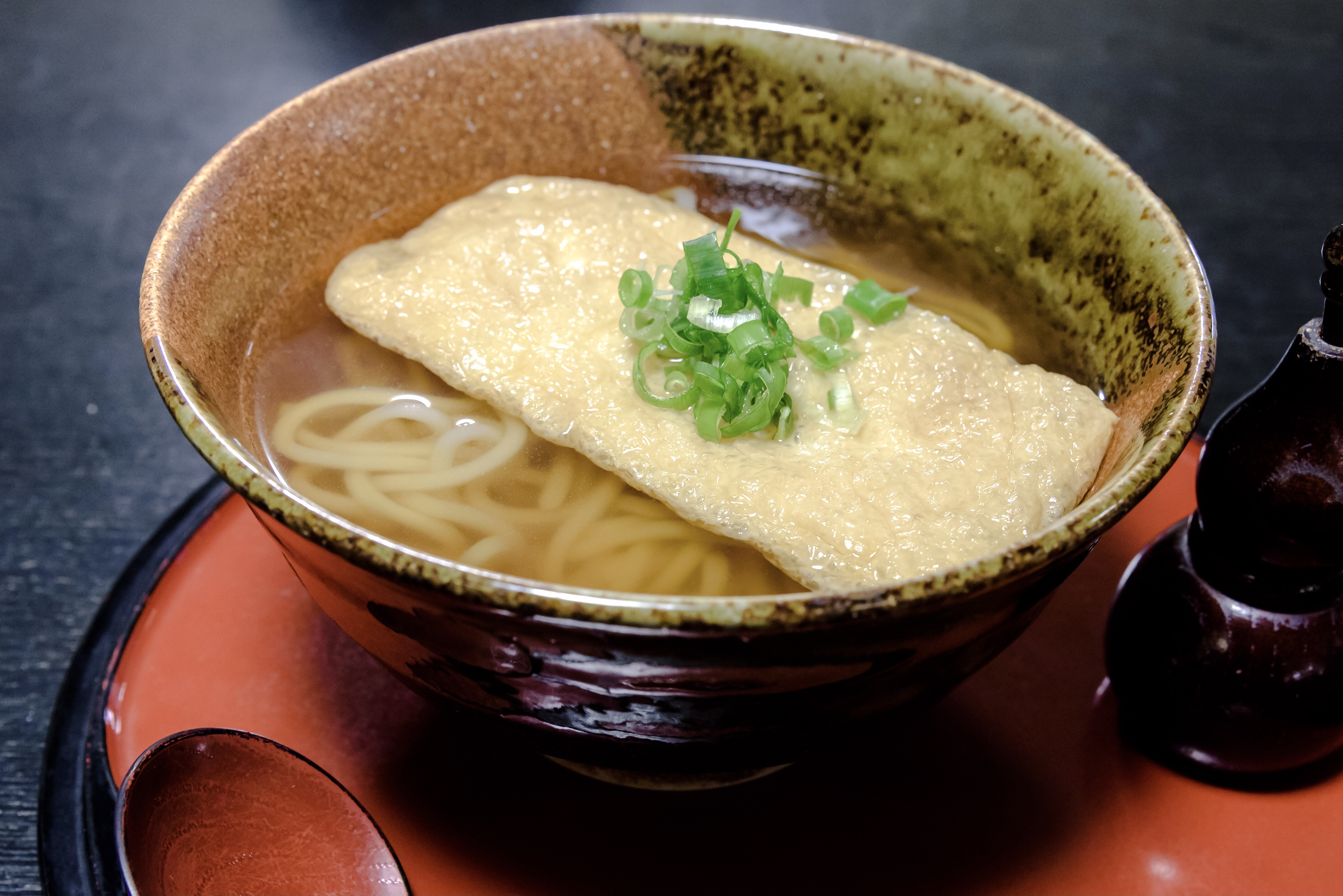
Kitsune udon

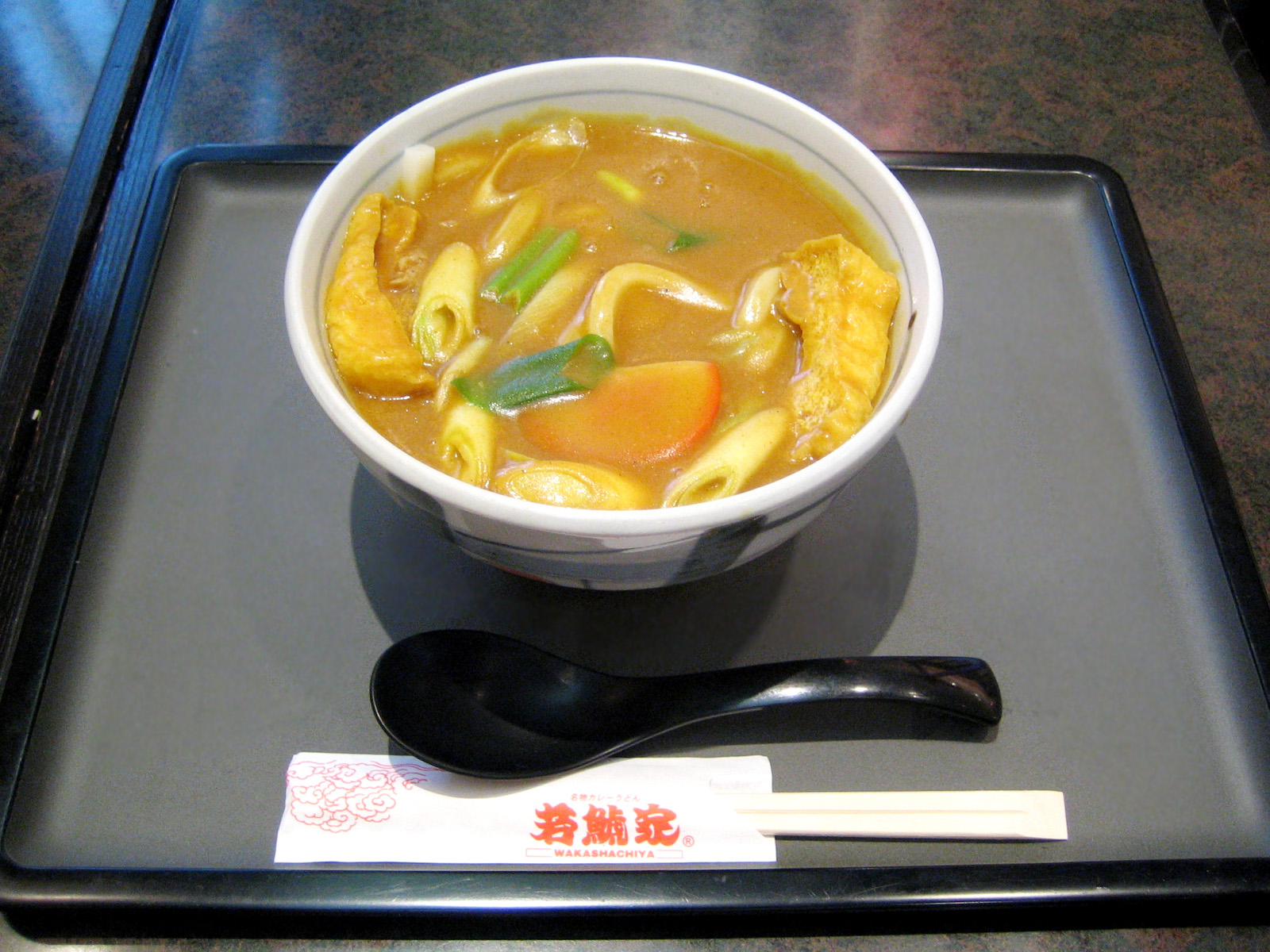
Curry udon

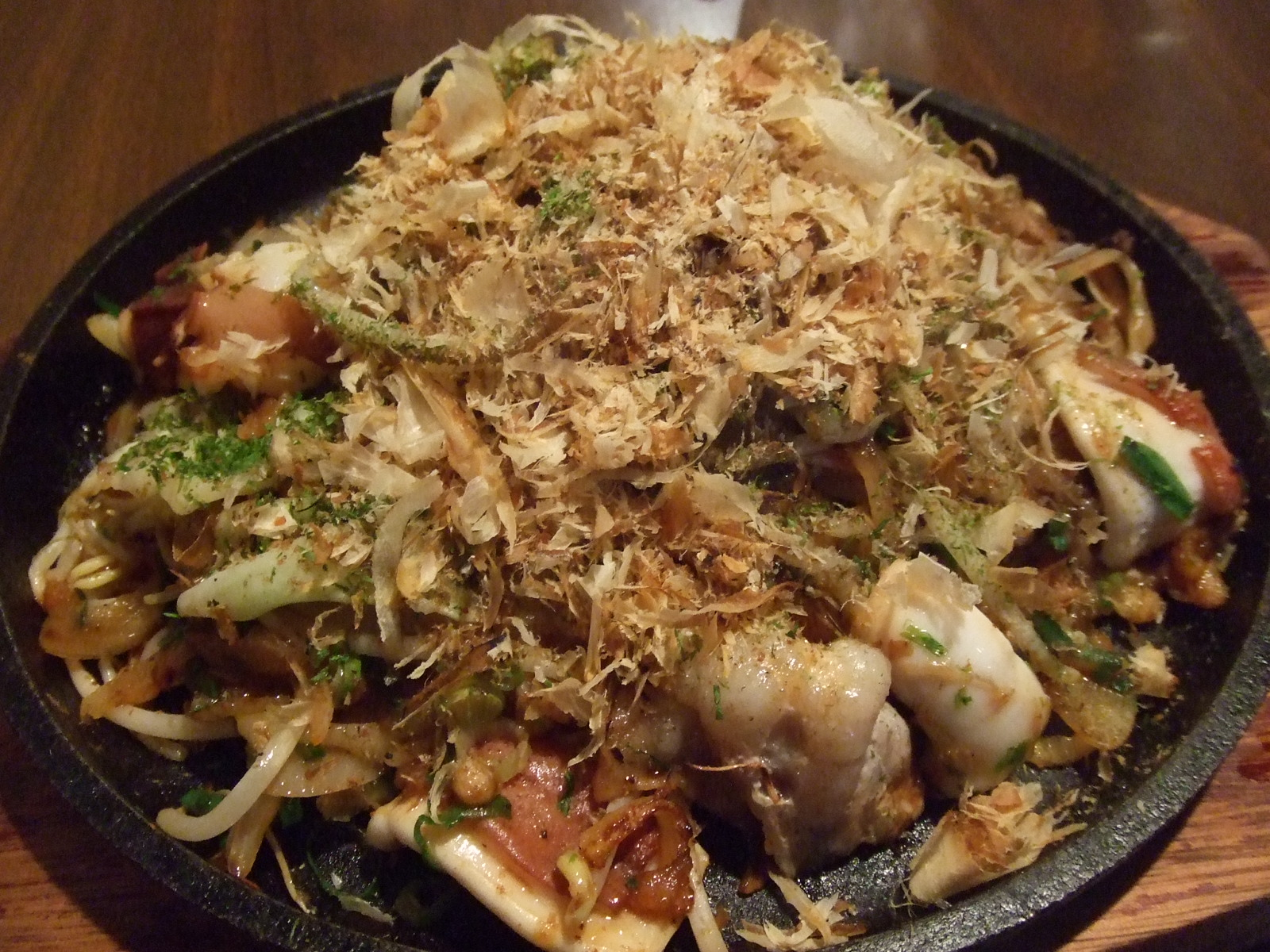
Yaki udon

- Chikara udon: ("power udon"): topped with toasted mochi rice cakes.
- Goboten udon: with deep-fried shredded burdock root.
- Haikara udon: ("modern udon"): see tanuki udon. From ハイカラ
- Kake udon (in the Kantō region) or su udon (in Kansai): hot udon in broth topped with thinly sliced green onions, and perhaps a slice of kamaboko.
- Kamaage udon: served in a communal hot-pot with hot water, and accompanied by a hot dipping sauce of dashi sukiyaki.
- Karē nanban or karē udon ("curry udon"): modern udon served in a spicy curry-flavoured broth, which may also include meat or vegetables. The term nanban is a reference to the Nanban trade which influenced Japanese culture for a century until it was banned in 1639 by the Edo Shogunate. Biei, Hokkaido is famous for a unique curry udon.
- Kitsune udon: ("fox udon"): topped with aburaage (sweet, deep-fried tofu pouches). The kitsune fox spirits are said to enjoy aburaage. Originated in Osaka.
- Maruten udon: topped with maruten, deep-fried large fish cake
- Nabeyaki udon: a sort of udon hot-pot, with seafood and vegetables cooked in a nabe, or metal pot. The most common ingredients are tempura shrimp with mushrooms and an egg cracked on top.
- Oboro udon: dashi broth with kombu flakes.
- Oyako udon: chicken and egg, with sliced onion in a sweetened dashi soup over udon. It has a sweet savory flavor.
- Sansai udon: udon with wild edible mountain vegetables.
- Su udon: see kake udon
- Sutamina udon: ("stamina udon"): udon with various hearty ingredients, usually including meat, a raw egg, and vegetables.
- Tanuki udon: (in the Kantō region) or Haikara udon (in Kansai): topped with tempura batter pieces.
- Tempura udon: topped with tempura, especially prawn, or kakiage, a type of mixed tempura fritter.
- Tsukimi udon: ("moon-viewing udon"): topped with raw egg, which poaches in the hot soup.
- Wakame udon: topped with wakame, a dark green seaweed.
- Yaki udon: stir-fried udon in soy-based sauce, prepared in a similar manner to yakisoba with a soy-based sauce, meat (usually pork), and vegetables. Yakiudon is relatively simple to make and a popular staple of Japan's izakaya, or pubs, as a late-night snack.Originated in Kitakyushu, Fukuoka Prefecture. The widely accepted story of how the dish was created dates back to just after World War II, when food was scarce. The owner of the noodle restaurant Darumado used udon noodles in popular yakisoba preparations, because the proper noodles were not available.

=== Cold ===
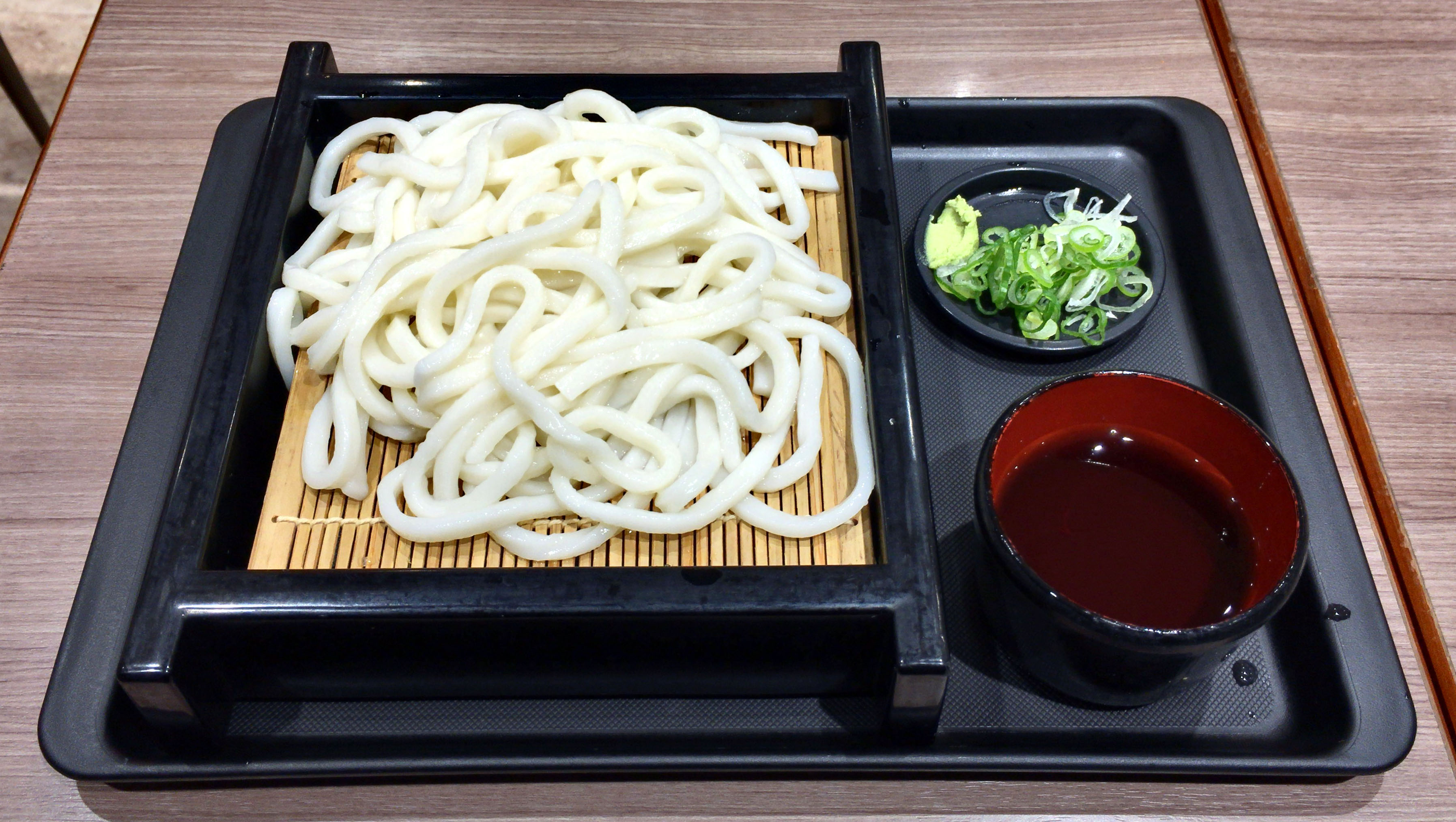
Mori udon

- Bukkake udon, (lit. 'poured broth udon'): cold udon served with hot dashi broth poured over it
- Hadaka udon (裸うどん, "naked udon"): cold udon served on its own.
- Kijōyu udon: served in a cold soup of raw (unpasteurized) soy sauce and sudachi (a type of citrus) juice, sometimes with a bit of grated daikon radish.
- Zaru udon: chilled udon noodles topped with shredded nori and served on a zaru (笊/ざる, a sieve-like bamboo tray). Accompanied by a chilled dipping sauce, usually a strong mixture of dashi, mirin, and soy sauce. Eaten with wasabi or grated ginger.

== Regional varieties ==
=== Japan ===
There are wide variations in both thickness and shape for udon noodles.

- Dango-jiru (団子汁): similar to the Hohtoh, from Ōita Prefecture. Nominally a "dumpling soup", it resembles very thick, flat udon.
- Gotō udon (五島うどん): a thin and firm variant from the Goto Islands. The noodles are coated in camellia oil, a natural preservative made from the seeds of camellias, which are abundant in the Goto Islands.
- Gōsetsu udon (豪雪うどん): a slightly translucent, chewy type from Kutchan, Hokkaido. Literally "heavy snow udon", made from the starch of potatoes. The texture is different from normal udon which is made from flour. At the foot of Mount Yōtei, Hokkaido, the biggest producing area of potatoes, "potato starch udon" was eaten as a home food for farmers from long ago. The ratio of potato starch and wheat flour was improved to make it delicious even after a long time. The origin of the name "heavy snow udon" is the foot of Mount Yōtei, a heavy snowfall area, and the appearance of the noodles which is slightly translucent like snow.
- Hakata udon (博多うどん): a thick and soft type from Fukuoka.
- Himokawa (ひもかわ): an extreme flat and wide type from Kiryū, Gunma.
- Hōtō (rarely 餺飥, commonly ほうとう): a type of miso soup from Yamanashi Prefecture with a flat and wide type udon and vegetables, particularly kabocha. One of the significant differences between usual udon and Hōtō udon is salt. When Hōtō udon is made, salt is not added to the noodle dough.
- Inaniwa udon (稲庭うどん): a thin, hand-stretched type from Akita Prefecture, counted among Japan's three great udons.
- Ise udon (伊勢うどん): a soft type, usually eaten with sweet soy sauce, from Ise, Mie.
- In Kansai region, a soft and medium thickness type is popular.

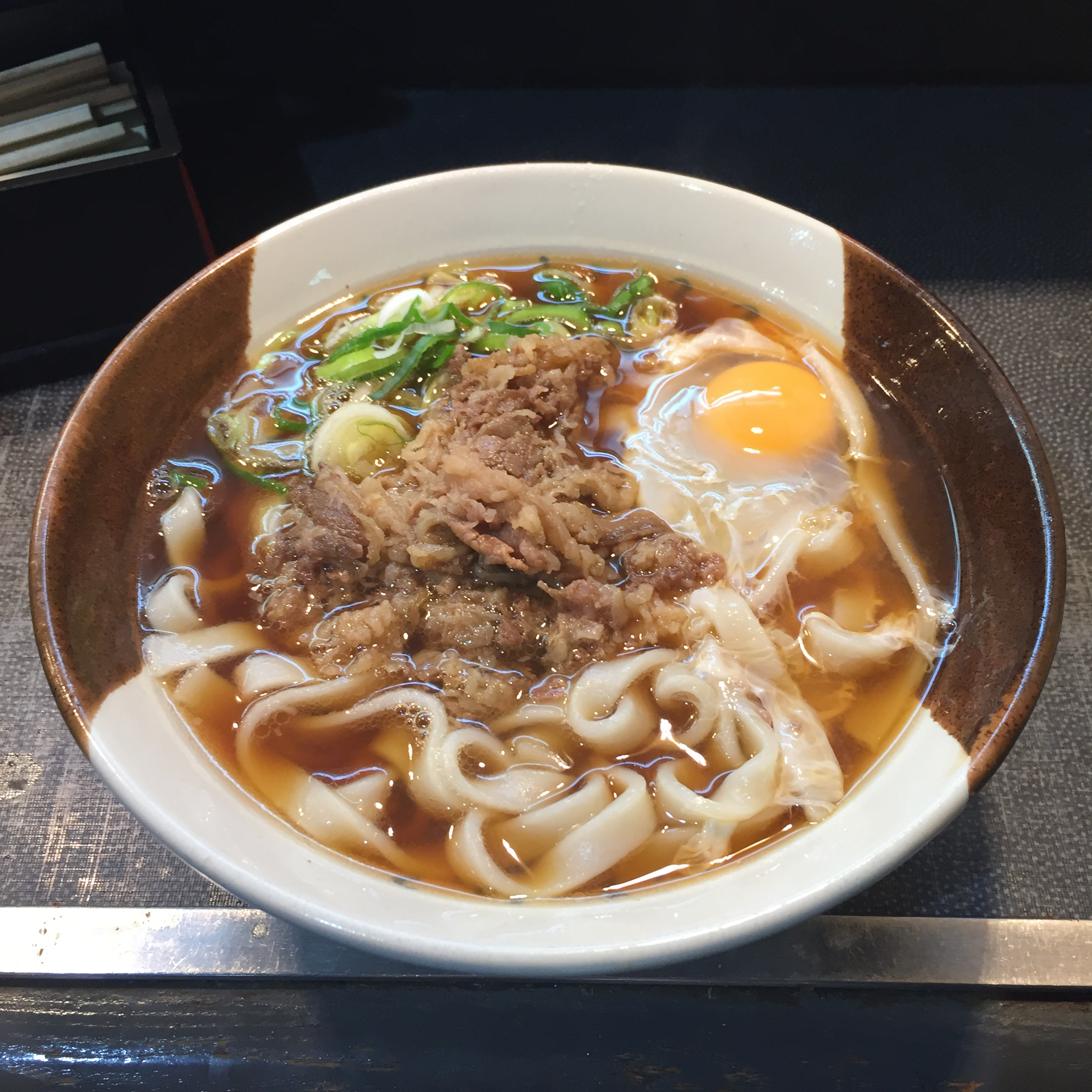
Kishimen, a variety from Nagoya

- Kishimen (棊子麺, or more commonly きし麺): a flat type with wavy edges, a regional specialty from Nagoya.
- Mimi udon (耳うどん; literally "ear udon"): a lucky preserved food in Kuzu, Tochigi. It looks similar to ears.
- Miso-nikomi udon: a local dish of Nagoya, a hard udon simmered in red miso soup. The soup generally contains chicken, a floating cracked raw egg that is stirred in by the eater, kamaboko, vegetables and tubers. The noodles are extremely firm in order to stand up to the prolonged simmering in the soup; additionally, the noodles do not contain salt, so as to avoid over-salting from the salt in the miso.
- Saitama Prefecture has several varieties of udon.
  - Kazo udon (加須うどん): produced in Kazo, Saitama, a place of active wheat production. Its very orthodox hand-kneading process characterizes Kazo udon noodles.
  - Fukaya Nibōtō (深谷煮ぼうとう): a type of hotoh from Fukaya, Saitama. Boiled noodles using plenty of Fukaya green onions characterize Fuyaya Niboto udon.
  - Konosu kawahaba udon (こうのす川幅うどん): originated of Kōnosu, Saitama in 2009. it is characterized by its width that is as wide as eight centimeters.
  - Niiza ninjin udon (新座にんじんうどん): originated of Niiza, Saitama in 2002. The noodles are kneaded with carrot and are characterized by their vivid orange color.
- Sanuki udon (讃岐うどん): a thick and rather stiff type from Kagawa Prefecture.
- Sara udon (皿うどん): a specialty of Nagasaki Prefecture. Literally "plate udon," consisting of thinner udon that are deep fried and served with any of a number of toppings.

=== Korea ===
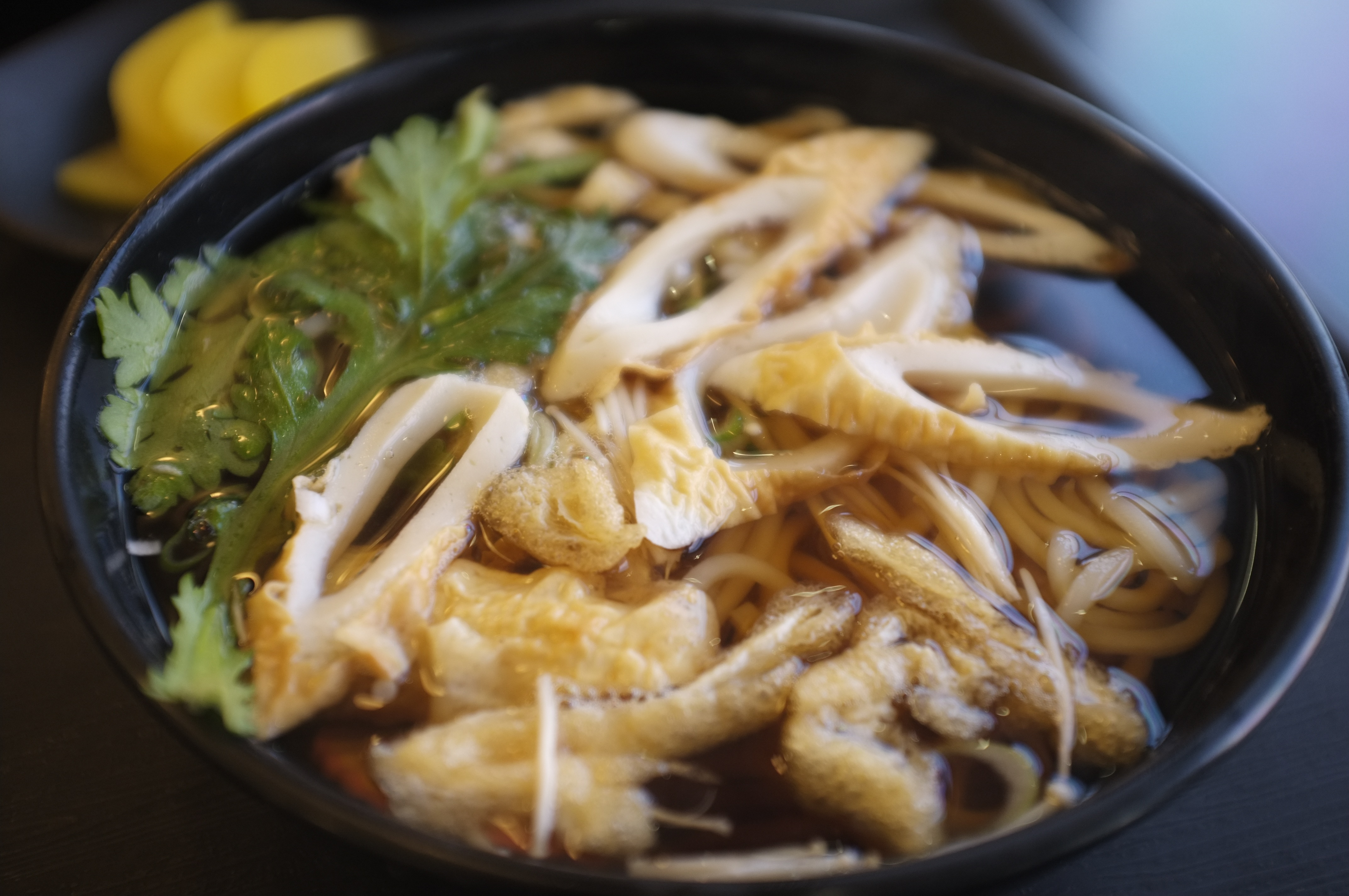
Udong, Korean-style udon noodle soup with crowndaisy greens and eomuk (fish cakes)

In Korea, authentic Japanese udon dishes are served in numerous Japanese restaurants, while the Korean-style udon noodle soups are served in bunsikjip (snack bars) and pojangmacha (street stalls). Both types are called udong (우동), which is the transliteration of the Japanese word udon (うどん). In Korea, the word udong refers to noodle dishes (typically noodle soup), while the noodles themselves are called udong-myeon (우동면; "udong noodles") and considered a type of garak-guksu (가락국수; "thick noodles"). Common ingredients for udong noodle soup include crowndaisy greens and eomuk (fish cakes), neither of which are very common in Japanese udon dishes.

=== Palau ===
There is a dish called udong in Palau, originated from the former Japanese administration. The broth is soy sauce–based like Japanese udon. However, as there were many immigrants from Okinawa, it uses less broth like Okinawa soba. Most notably, the noodle is that of spaghetti, as it is easier to acquire there.

Languages of the neighboring Federated States of Micronesia also have similar loanwords from Japanese udon; Chuukese: wutong, Pohnpeian: udong, Kosraean: utong, and Yapese: qudoong.

=== Philippines ===
Cebuano: odong or udong of Davao Region and Visayas is inspired by the Japanese udon, although they share no resemblance in modern times. Odong are wheat based yellow thick Chinese noodles (pancit), similar to Okinawa soba. A typical odong bowl is prepared with canned sardine and tomato sauce. Other dishes such as layering with greens are also popular. During the early 1900s, there was a large community of Japanese laborers in Davao, half of them Okinawans. In this period, the Japanese manufactured odong.

== Tourism ==
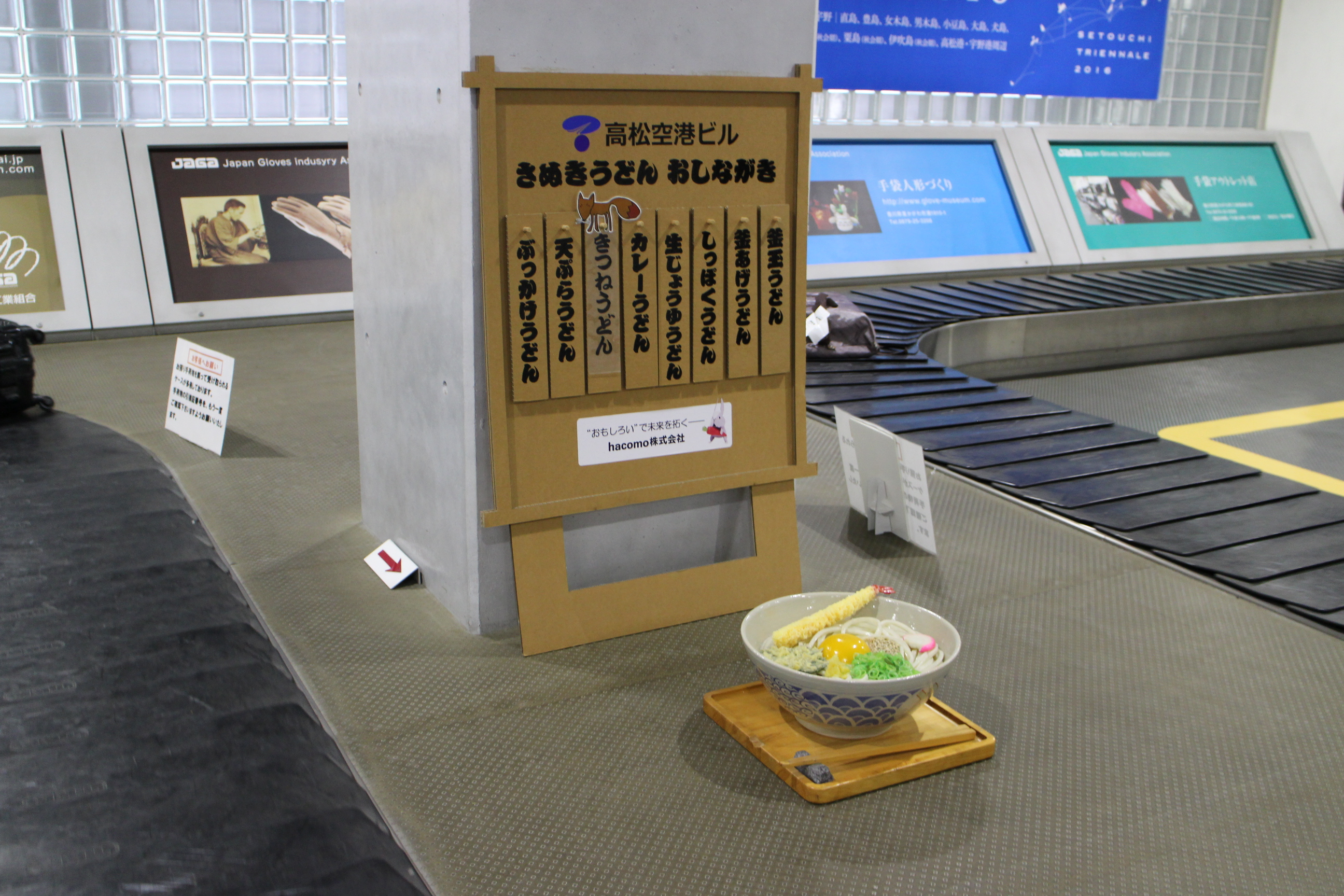
Model bowl of udon and menu at baggage counter in Takamatsu Airport

Kagawa prefecture is well known throughout Japan for its sanuki udon (讃岐うどん). It is promoted to other regions of Japan through themed mascots, souvenirs and movies.

== Gallery ==
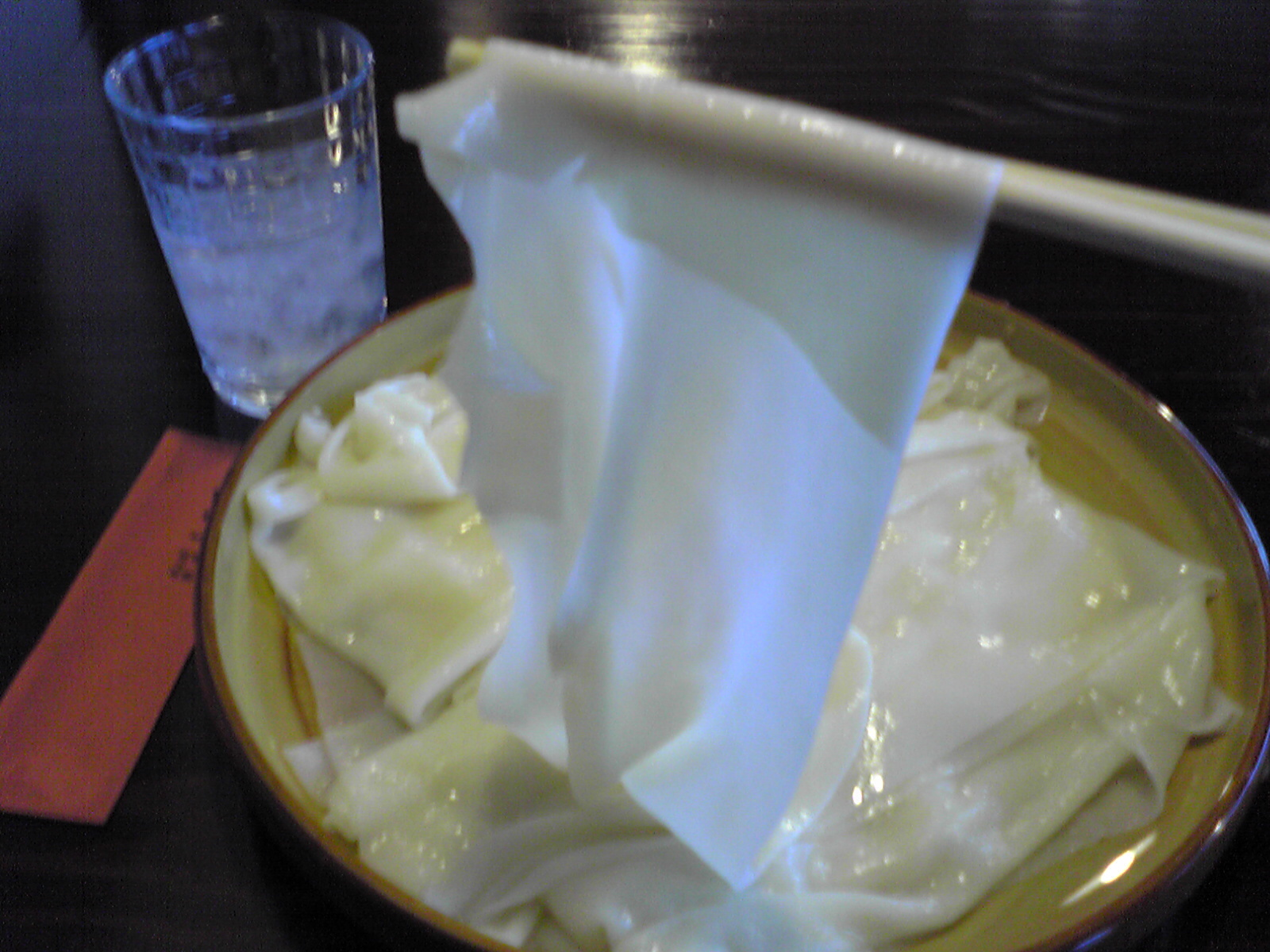
Himokawa

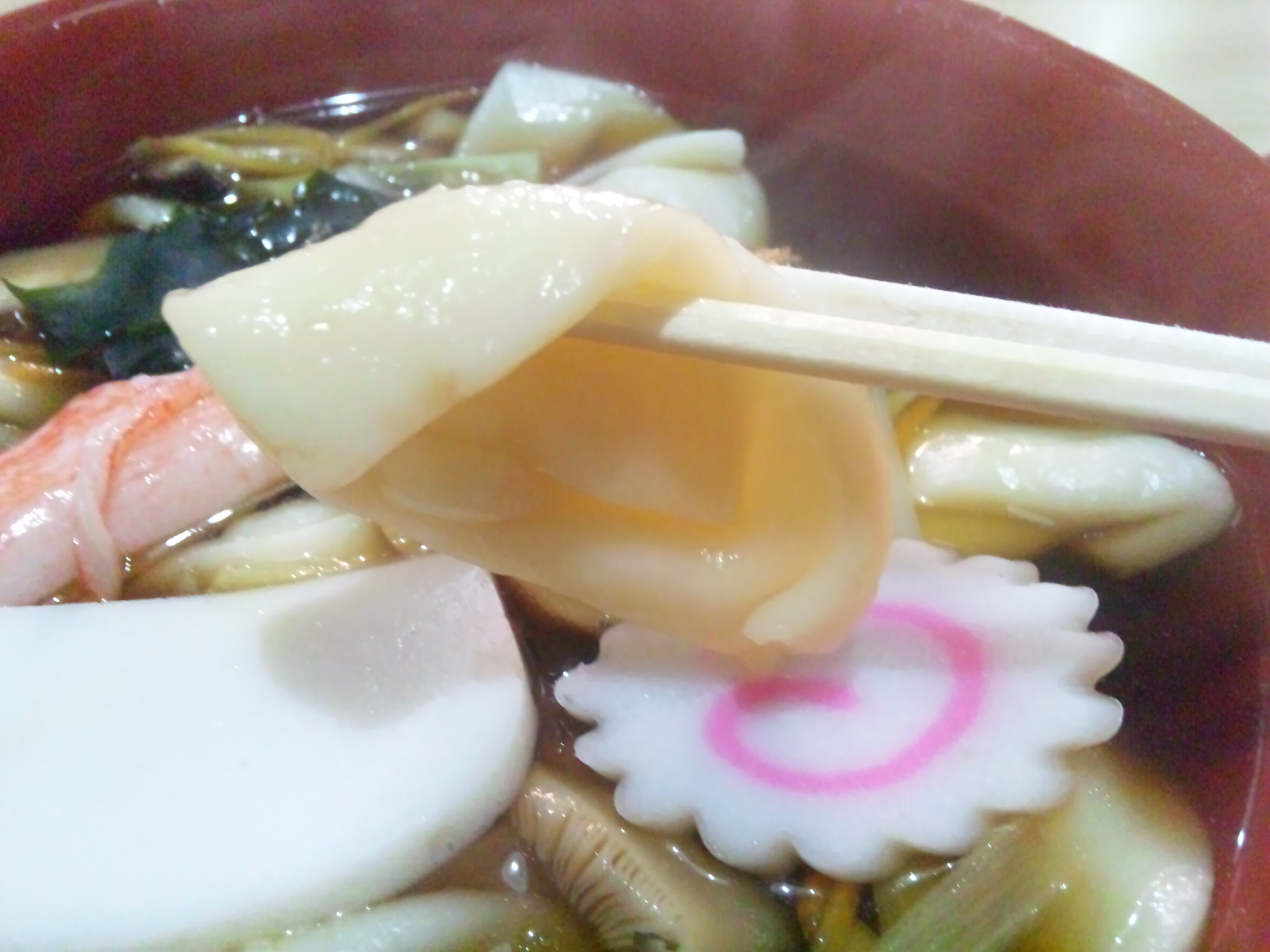
Mimi-udon

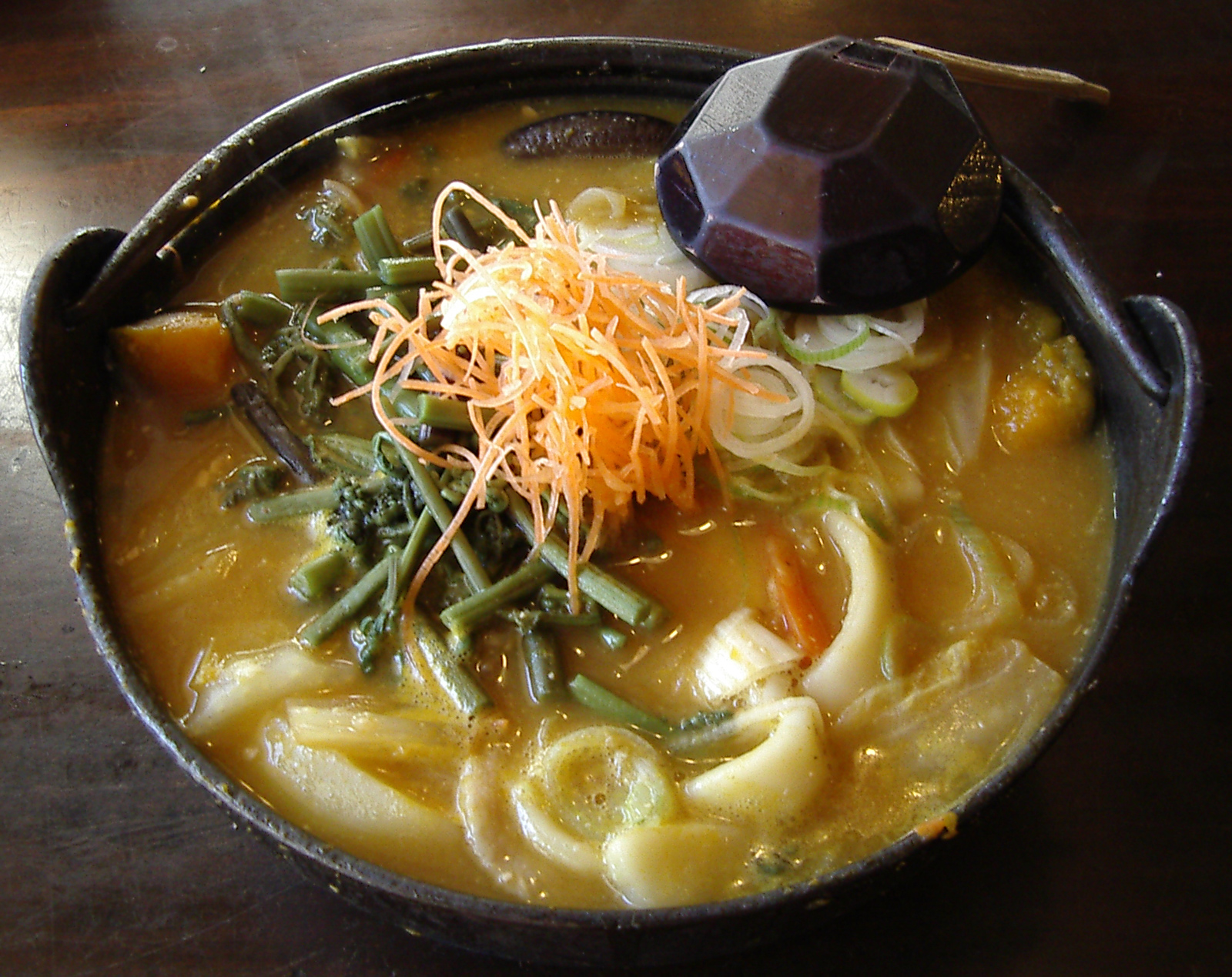
Hōtō

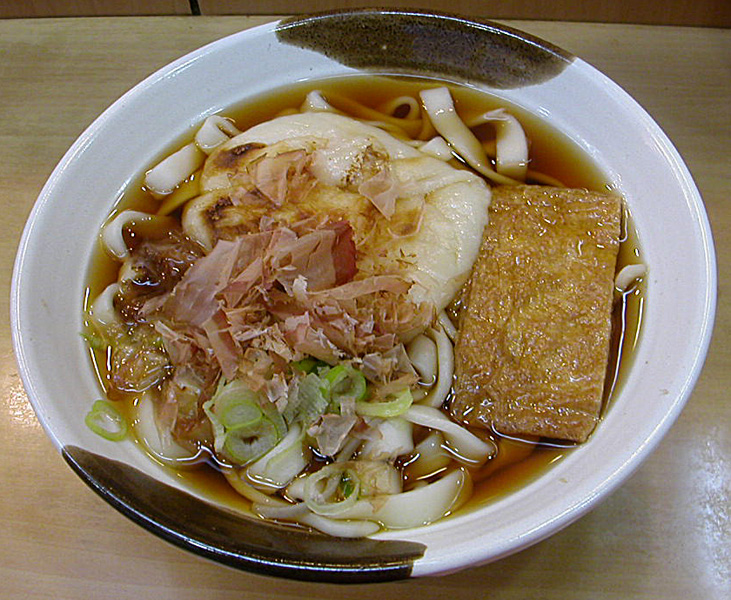
Kishimen

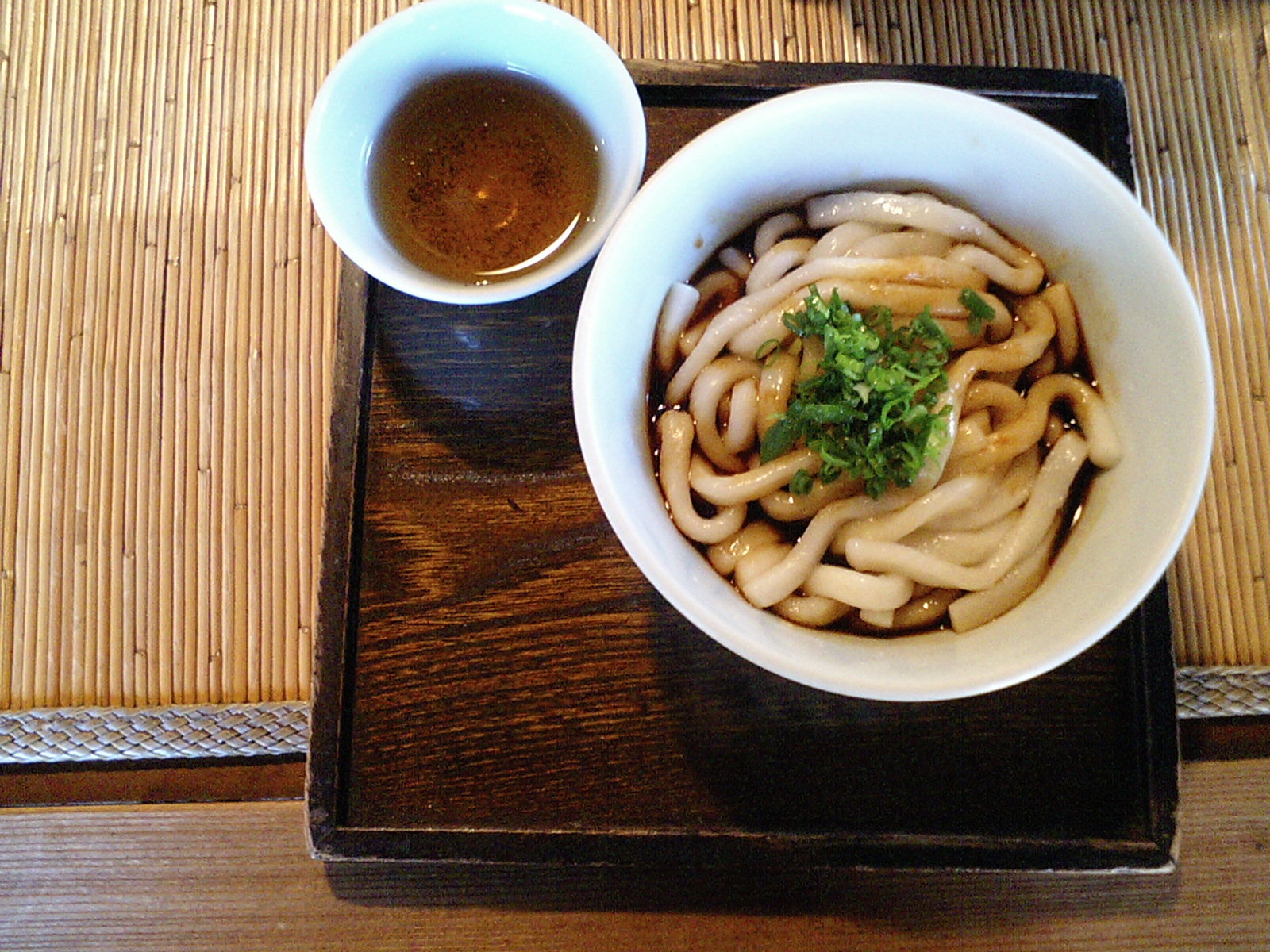
Ise-udon

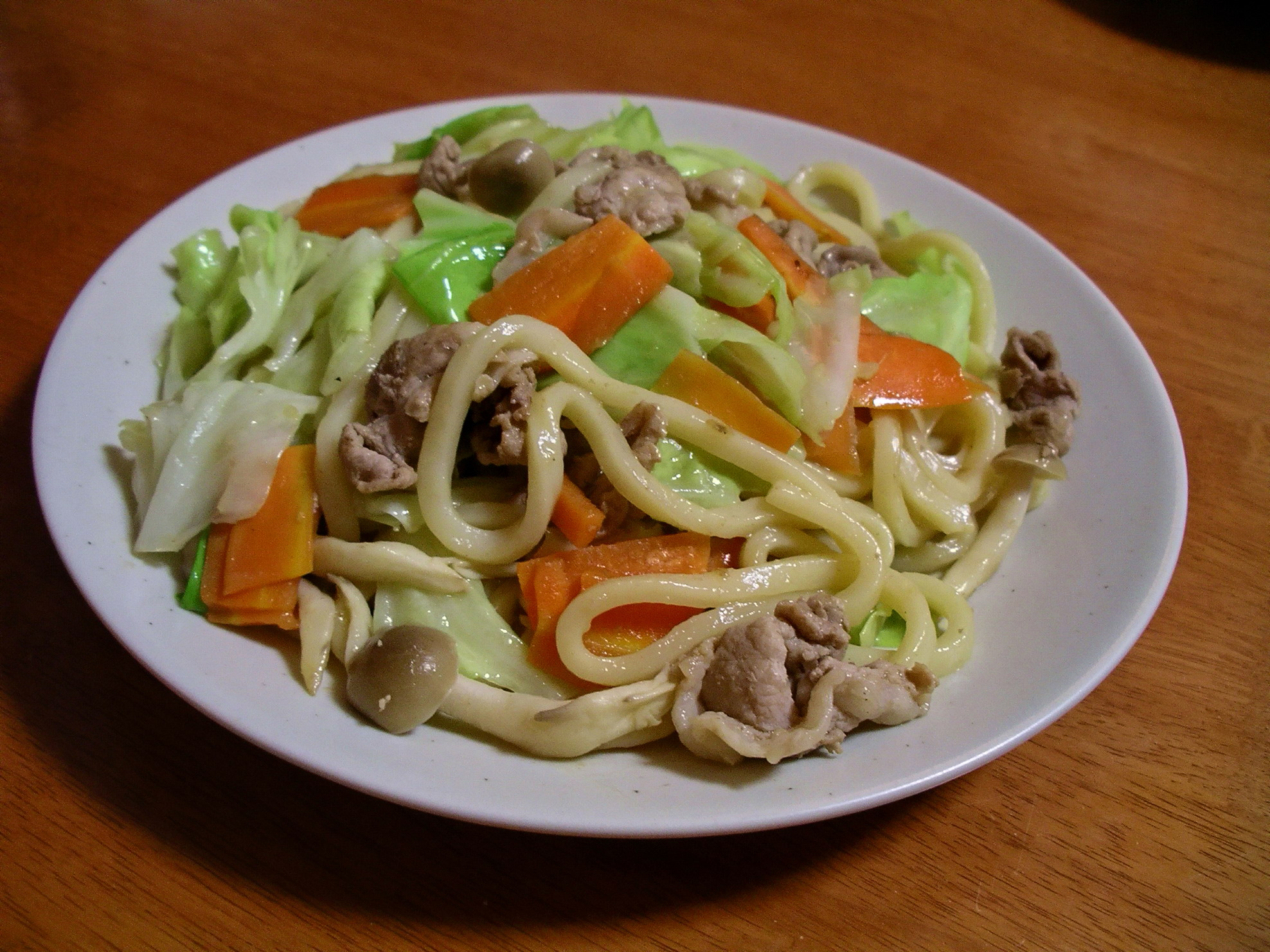
Yaki-udon

== See also ==
- Thick wheat noodles:
  - Bigoli, similar Italian noodle from Veneto
  - Cumian, similar Chinese noodle
  - Kal-guksu, similar Korean noodle
  - Pici, similar Italian noodle from Tuscany
- Japanese noodles:
  - Hiyamugi
  - Soba
  - Sōmen
  - Okinawa soba
