= Hiyamugi =

Japanese noodle dish

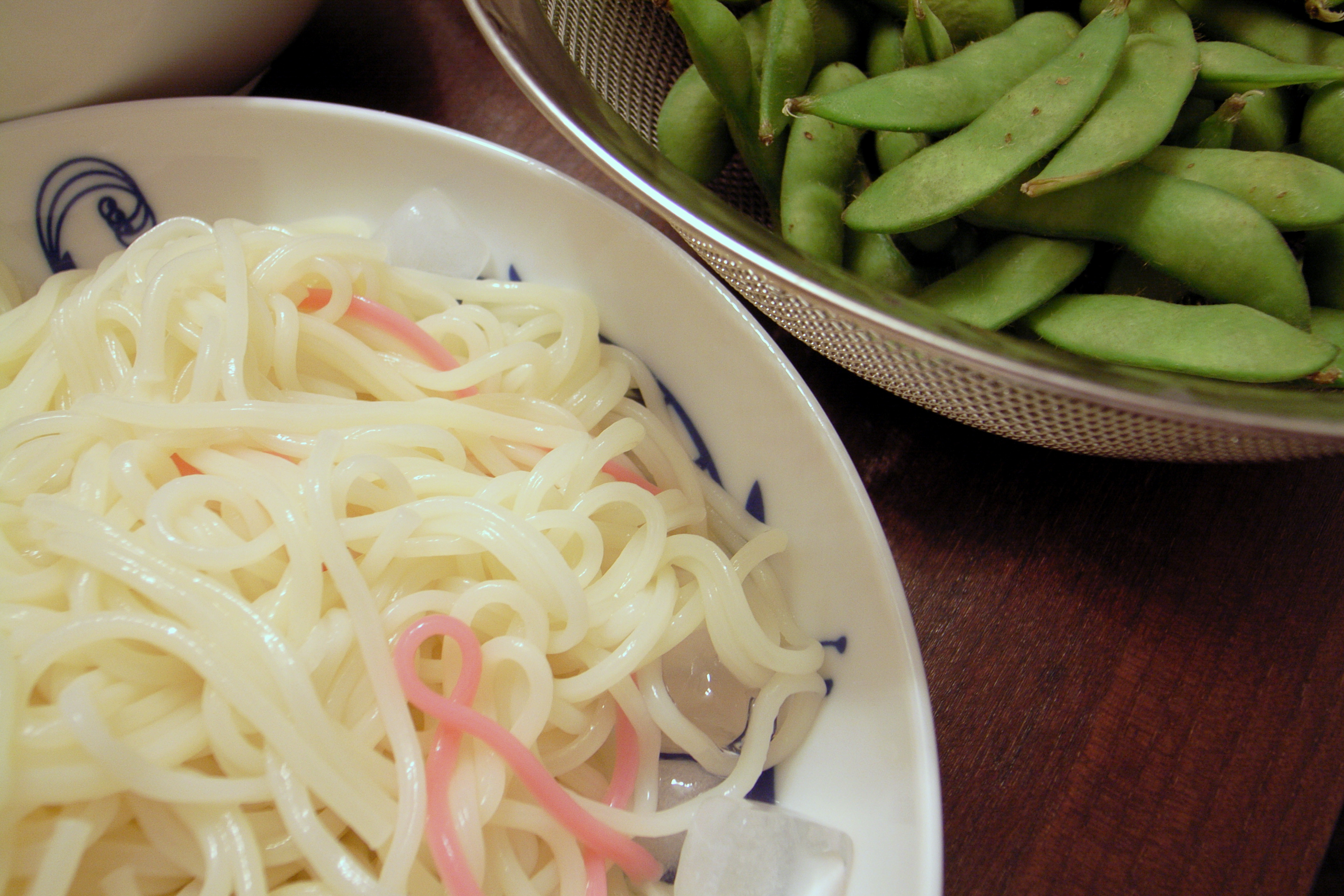
Hiyamugi and edamame

Hiyamugi (Japanese: 冷麦, lit. 'chilled wheat') are very thin dried Japanese noodles made of wheat. They are similar to but slightly thicker than the thinnest Japanese noodle type called sōmen. Hiyamugi closely resembles Western-style vermicelli. They are the second thinnest type of Japanese noodle after sōmen, while the well-known udon is a thicker style of wheat noodle.

Hiyamugi, like sōmen, is traditionally enjoyed cold during the summer months. While sōmen are sometimes served hot in a dish called nyumen, hiyamugi is typically served cold, sometimes over ice or floating in water in a clear glass bowl. The chilled noodles are served with a dipping sauce on the side called tsukejiru that is made with dashi, soy sauce and mirin.

== History ==
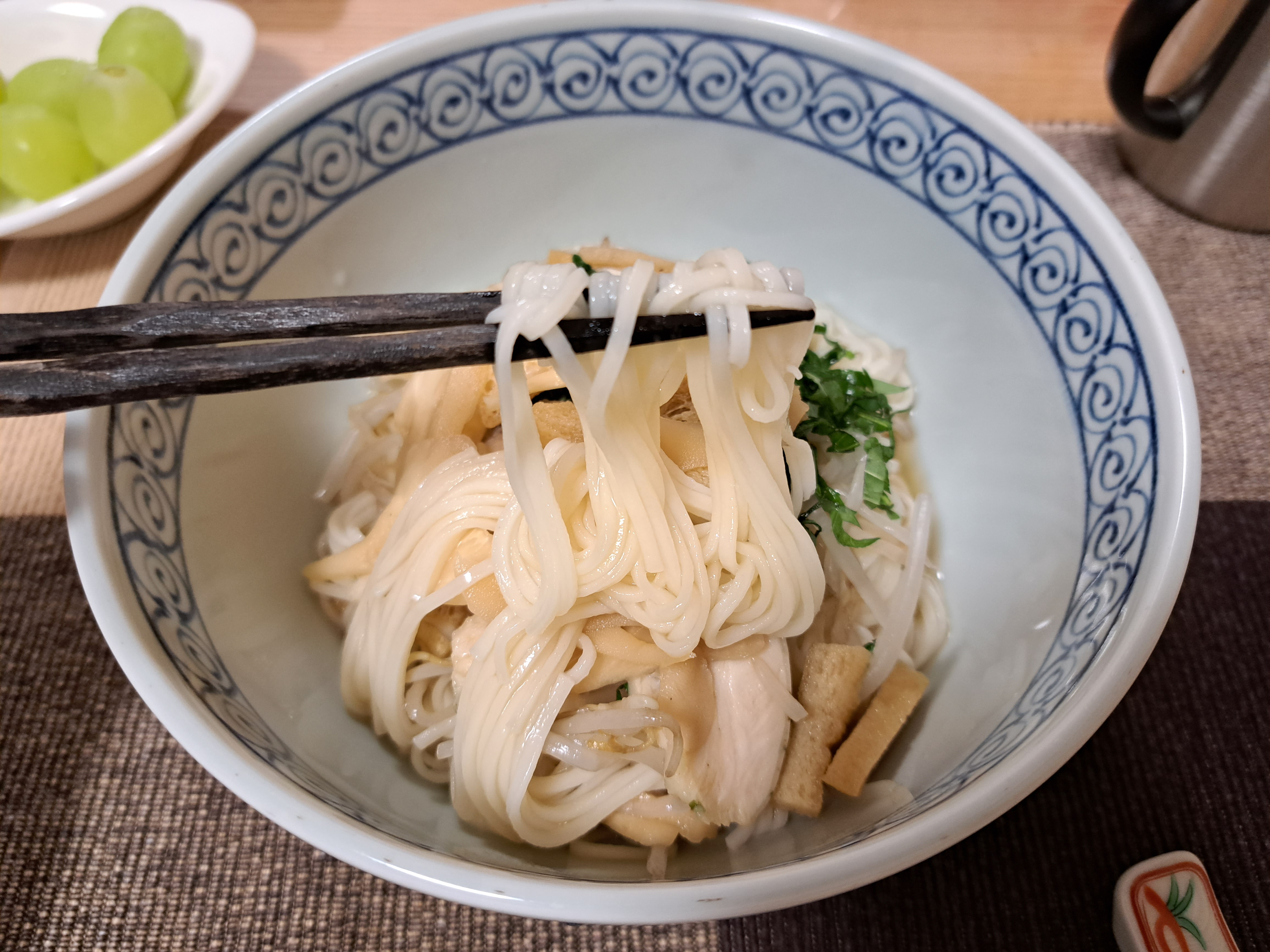
Hiyamugi with tofu

Hiyamugi are mentioned in Zenrin Kouta, a 14th-century text by Ryoyo Shogei, critical of Zen Buddhism. This text was written shortly after the end of the Kamakura era and is one of the only known literary mentions of noodles from this period. According to Shogei, the Shōkoku-ji Temple complex had facilities for the production of udon and hiyamugi noodles and steamed buns called manjū. Within the Shōkoku-ji complex, the Uncho-in Temple was responsible for hiyamugi production. Due to the popularity of this style of noodle in the summer months, production of hiyamugi began on April 14 each year at the Uncho-in Temple.

The Onryo-ken Nichiroku records kept by Kikei Shinzui between 1435 and 1466 at the Rokuon-ji Temple (also part of the Shōkoku-ji Temple complex) do not mention the "daily noodles" served to monks each day. It does, however, mention hiyamugi among the noodles served to visitors and guests as part of the toki (時) lunch meal.

Hiyamugi are mentioned in the 15th century diaries of Japanese nobleman Yamashina Noritoki which state that on 19 June 1405 he was visited by one Genseido, who was offered a summer meal of hiyamugi.

== See also ==
- List of noodles
