= Slicer =

Slicer may refer to:

== Food slicers ==
- Egg slicer
- Meat slicer
- Spiral vegetable slicer
- Tomato slicer

== Software ==
- 3D Slicer, a free and open source software package for image analysis and scientific visualization
- Slicer (3D printing), computer software used in the majority of 3D printing processes

== People ==
- Henry Slicer (1801–1874), American Methodist minister and Chaplain of the Senate
- Jacky Slicer (born 1902), English footballer
- Pierre Slicer (born 1943), Australian judge

== TV episodes ==
- "The Slicer" (Seinfeld), 163rd episode of the NBC sitcom

== Other ==
- Slicer (guitar effect)
- Slicer (enzyme), part of the RISC complex causing mRNA degradation
- Sir Slicer, a character in the 4th episode of 2nd season of the TV series Adventure Time

== See also ==
- Slice (disambiguation)
