= Stock (food) =

Savory cooking liquid

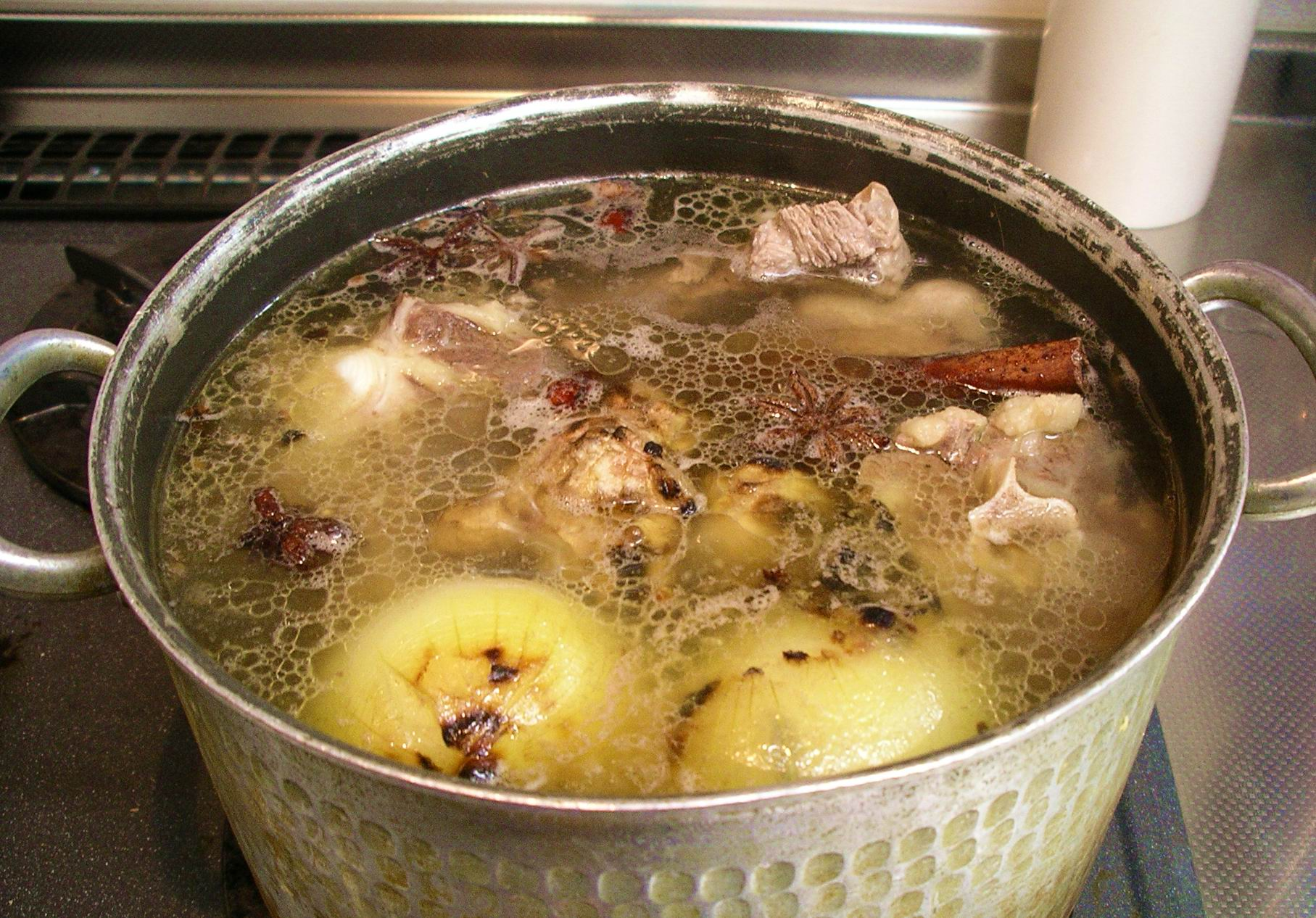
Making stock in a pot on a stovetop

Stock, sometimes called bone broth, is a savory cooking liquid that forms the basis of many dishes – particularly soups, stews, and sauces. Making stock involves simmering animal bones, meat, seafood, or vegetables in water or wine, often for an extended period. Mirepoix or other aromatics may be added for more flavor.

== Preparation ==
Traditionally, stock is made by simmering various ingredients in water. A newer approach is to use a pressure cooker. The ingredients may include some or all of the following:

Bones: Beef and chicken bones are most commonly used; fish is also common. The flavor of the stock comes from the bone marrow, cartilage and other connective tissue. Connective tissue contains collagen, which is converted into gelatin that thickens the liquid. Stock made from bones needs to be simmered for long periods; pressure cooking methods shorten the time necessary to extract the flavor from the bones.

Meat: Cooked meat still attached to bones is also used as an ingredient, especially with chicken stock. Meat cuts with a large amount of connective tissue, such as shoulder cuts, are also used.

Mirepoix: Mirepoix is a combination of onions, carrots, celery, and sometimes other vegetables added to flavor the stock. Sometimes, the less desirable parts of the vegetables that may not otherwise be eaten (such as carrot skins and celery cores and leaves) are used, as the solids are removed from stock.

Herbs and spices: The herbs and spices used depend on availability and local traditions. In classical cuisine, the use of a bouquet garni ('bag of herbs') consisting of parsley, bay leaves, a sprig of thyme, and possibly other herbs, is common. This is often placed in a sachet to make it easier to remove once the stock is cooked.

== Types ==
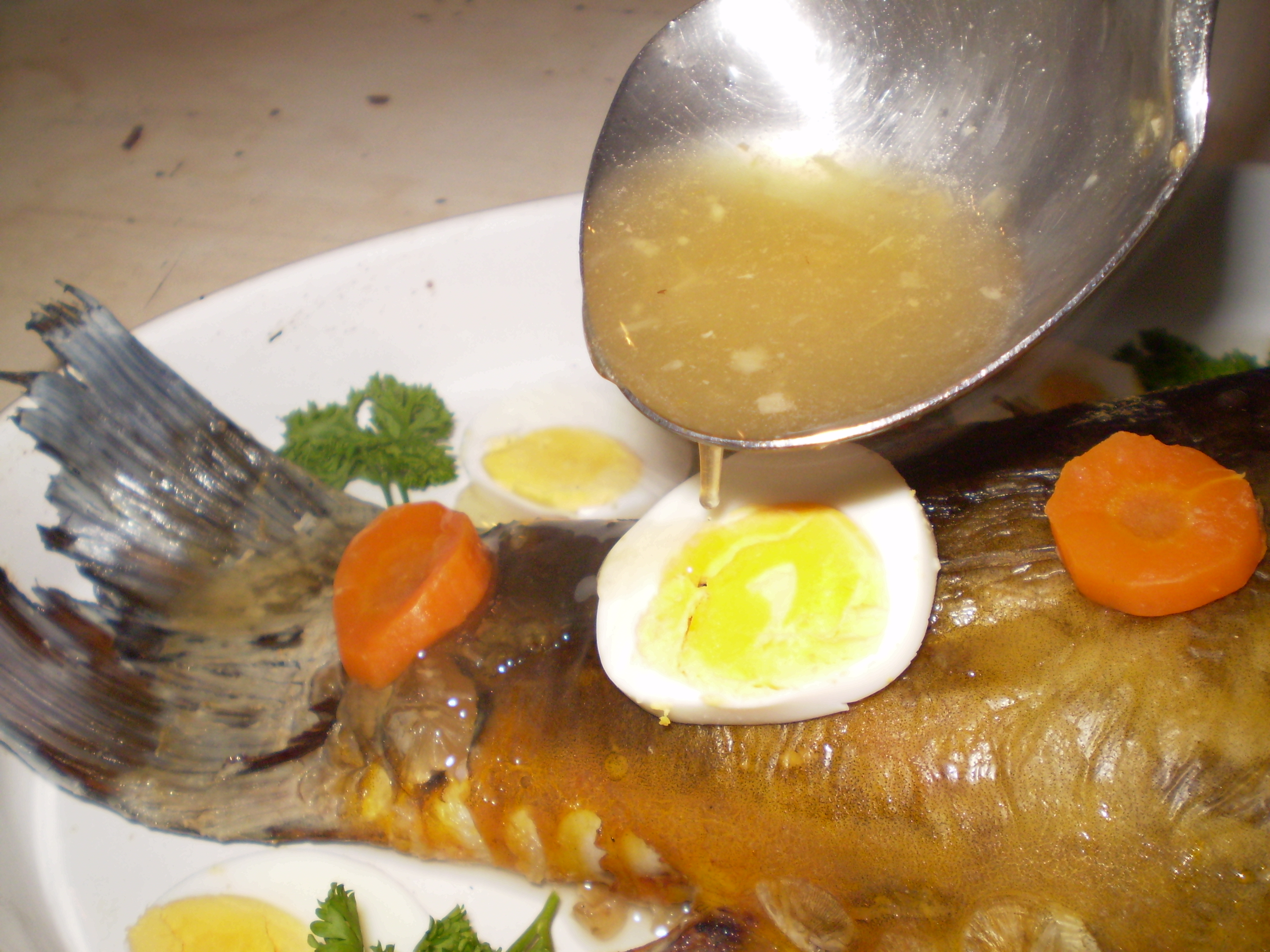
Pouring fish stock on a stuffed fish

Basic stocks are usually named for the primary meat type. A distinction is usually made between fond blanc, or white stock, made by using raw bones and mirepoix, and fond brun, or brown stock, which gets its color by roasting the bones and mirepoix before boiling; the bones may also be coated in tomato paste before roasting. Chicken is most commonly used for fond blanc, while beef or veal are most commonly used in fond brun.

Other regional varieties include:

- Dashi is a family of stocks in Japanese cooking, typically made by briefly simmering a variety of kelp called kombu in nearly boiling water, often with other ingredients such as katsuobushi or shiitake.
- Myeolchi yuksu is a stock in Korean cooking made by briefly cooking dried anchovies with kelp in nearly boiling water.
- Glace de viande is stock, usually made from veal, that is highly concentrated by reduction.
- Ham stock, common in Cajun cooking, is made from ham hocks.
- Master stock is a Chinese stock used primarily for poaching meats, flavored with soy sauce, sugar, ginger, garlic, and other aromatics.
- Prawn stock is made from boiling prawn shells. It is used in Southeast Asian dishes such as laksa.
- Remouillage is a second stock made from the same set of bones.
- Bran stock is bran boiled in water. It can be used to thicken meat soups, used as a stock for vegetable soups or made into soup itself with onions, vegetables and molasses.

== Stock versus broth ==
Many cooks and food writers use the terms broth and stock interchangeably. In 1974, James Beard (an American cook) wrote that stock, broth, and bouillon "are all the same thing".

While many draw a distinction between stock and broth, the details of the distinction often differ. One possibility is that stocks are made primarily from animal bones, as opposed to meat, and therefore contain more gelatin, giving them a thicker texture. Another distinction that is sometimes made is that stock is cooked longer than broth and therefore has a more intense flavour. A third possible distinction is that stock is left unseasoned for use in other recipes, while broth is salted and otherwise seasoned and can be eaten alone.

== Health claims ==
By the early 2010s, "bone broth" had become a popular health food trend, due to the resurgence in popularity of dietary fat over sugar, and interest in "functional foods" to which "culinary medicinals" such as turmeric and ginger could be added. Bone broth bars, bone broth home delivery services, bone broth carts, and bone broth freezer packs grew in popularity in the United States. The fad was heightened by the 2014 book Nourishing Broth, in which authors Sally Fallon Morell and Kaayla T. Daniel claim that the broth's nutrient density has a variety of health effects.

There is no scientific evidence to support many of the claims made for bone broth.

== In popular culture ==
Grogu sipping bone broth in "Chapter 4: Sanctuary" (2019), the fourth episode of the first season of the American streaming television series The Mandalorian, became an Internet meme, as the cuteness of the character's slurping made two other characters abruptly stop fighting.

== Bibliography ==
- Escoffier, Auguste (1903). Le Guide culinaire. Aide mémoire de cuisine pratique. Paris, France: Flammarion.
- Escoffier, Auguste (1907). A Guide to Modern Cookery. Heinemann. OL 24167463M.
- Escoffier, A (1941). The Escoffier Cook Book. New York: Crown Publishers.
- Fannie Merritt Farmer (1896). The Boston Cooking-School Cook Book. Boston, Massachusetts: Little, Brown and Company.
- Beck, Simone; Louisette Bertholle; Julia Child (1961). Mastering the Art of French Cooking. New York: Alfred A. Knopf.
