= Meat slicer =

Tool for cutting meat

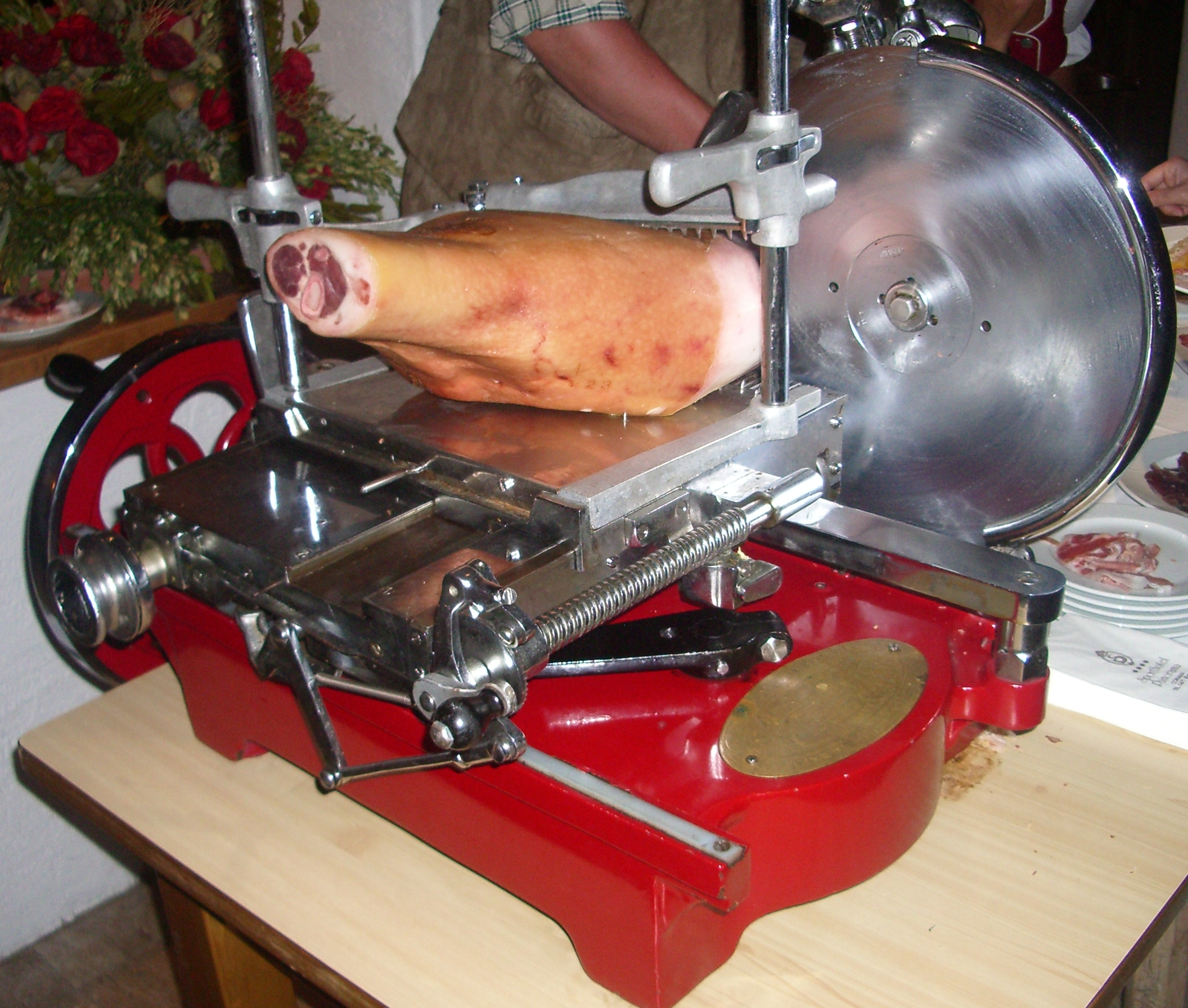
Antique meat slicer.

A meat slicer, also called a slicing machine, deli slicer or simply a slicer, is a tool used in butcher shops and delicatessens to slice meats, sausages, cheeses and other deli products. Compared to a simple knife, using a meat slicer requires less effort, as well as keeps the texture of food more intact. Generally, slicers can be adjusted easily to cut slices of variable thickness. Older models of meat slicer may be operated by crank, while newer ones generally use an electric motor. While the slicer is traditionally a commercial apparatus, domestic use versions are also marketed.

== See also ==
- Egg slicer
- Kezuriki
- Mandoline
- Spiral vegetable slicer
- Tomato slicer
