= Oroshigane =

Japanese kitchen utensil

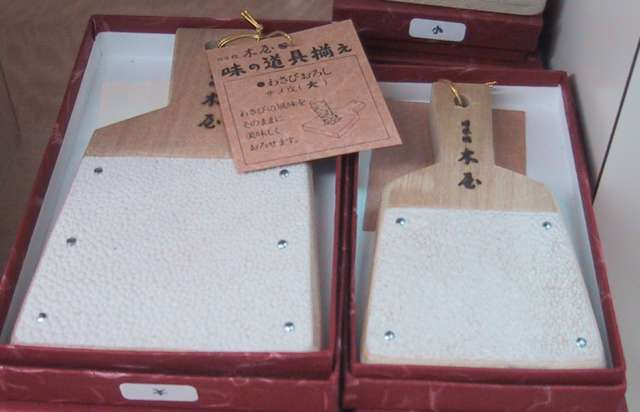
Oroshiki grater made with shark skin

Oroshigane (おろし金/下ろし金, "grating metal"), also known as oroshiki (下ろし器), are graters used in Japanese cooking.

Oroshigane differ significantly from Western-style graters, as they produce a much finer grating. Traditionally, these graters were tin-coated copper plates with many small spikes gouged out of the metal, but no actual perforations through the metal. These graters are still considered the best and are used by professional chefs. For preparing wasabi and yamaimo, graters with the surface made from shark skin were exclusively used. These have an even finer grating surface than a metal one; much closer to a sanding paper. However, nowadays non-professional cooks usually use much less expensive graters made from other metals, plastic, or ceramics. A modern variation of these graters also has perforations and may come with a matching box so that the grated material drops through the grater into the box.

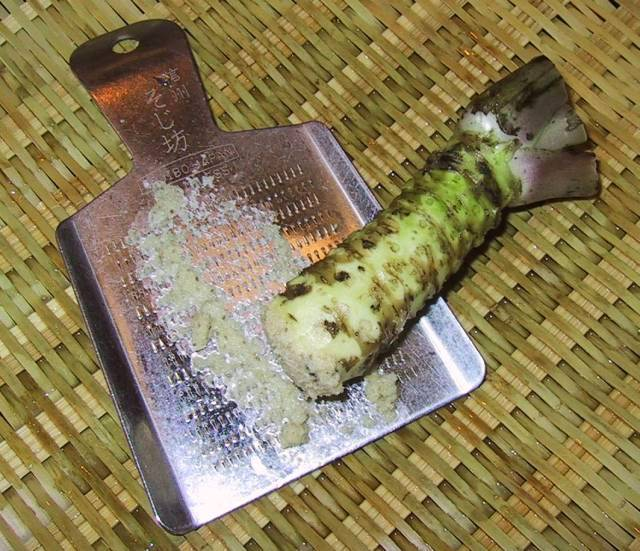
Wasabi on a metal oroshigane

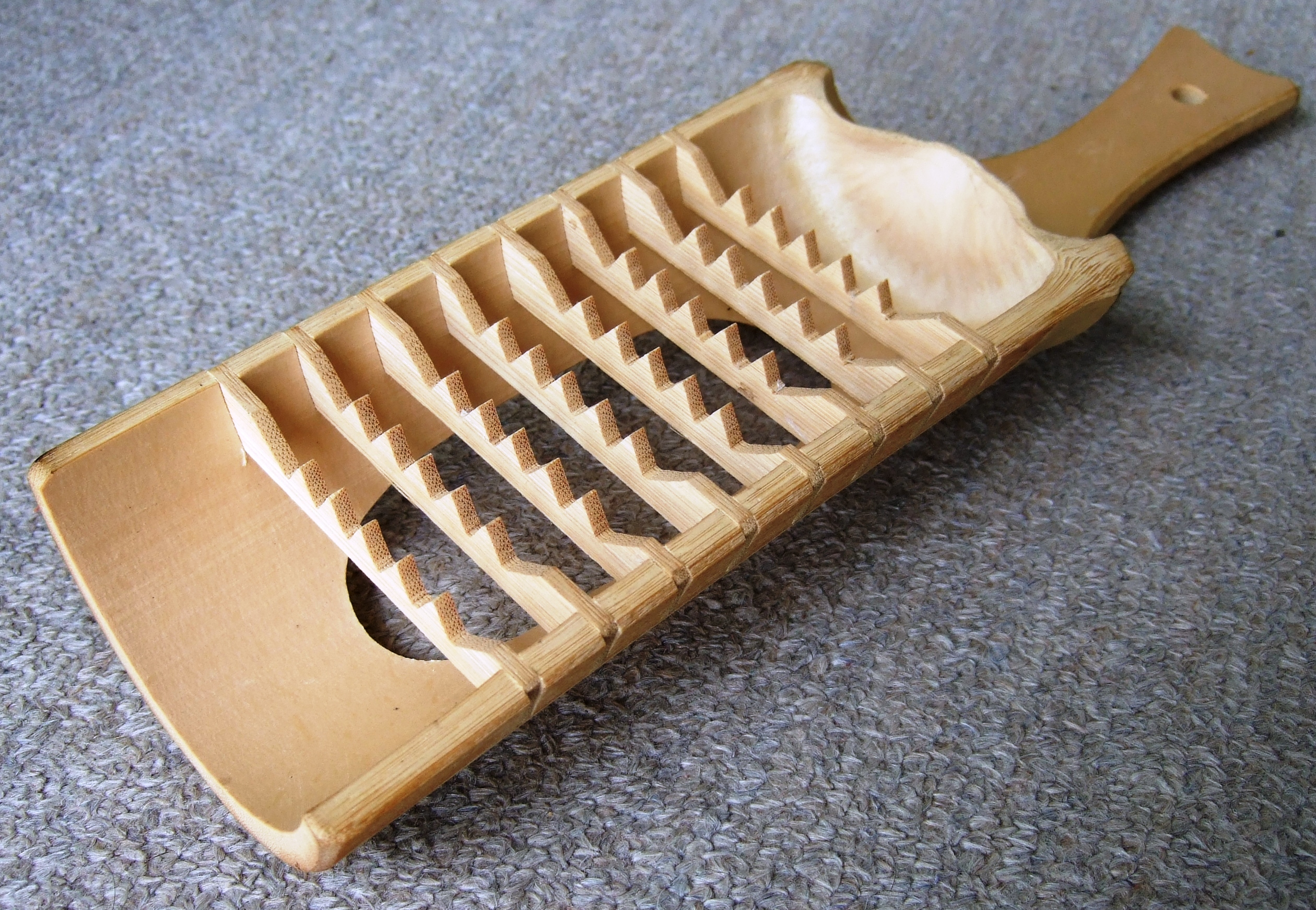
Bamboo onioroshi

There are two versions of the grater in common use with different coarseness. The coarse grater is used to grate daikon and similar foodstuffs, whereas the fine graters are used for grating wasabi or ginger. The fine graters are also sometimes sold as a wooden board covered with shark skin, which has many tiny teeth (dermal denticles) and give it a feel similar to sandpaper.

== See also ==
- List of Japanese cooking utensils
- Grater
- Mandoline
- Kezuriki, a type of grater used to produce katsuobushi
