= Tomato slicer =

Kitchen appliance

A tomato slicer is an apparatus designed to slice tomatoes and other soft fruits and vegetables.

== History ==
Tomato slicers have been sold since the 1950s. A tomato slicer was patented in the United States in 1968, by Clayton Giangiulio.

== See also ==
- Tomato knife
- Egg slicer
- Mandoline
