= Logan Moffitt =

Canadian influencer and chef

- Born: 2000 or 2001 (age 24–25); Ottawa, Canada
- Occupations: chef, influencer

Logan Moffitt (born 2000 or 2001) is a Canadian influencer and chef best known for his cucumber-focused content creation. He has been dubbed "cucumber king" by his followers. His social media content has been cited as responsible for a cucumber shortage in Iceland and a dramatic rise in mandoline slicer sales. He won a Webby Award in 2025 and was ranked #50 in Forbes's Top Creators list in 2026.

== Biography ==
Moffitt was born in 2000 or 2001 and raised in Ottawa, and learned to cook from his grandmother and content creators such as Maangchi. By age 12, he was cooking dinner for his family almost every night. Moffitt has claimed he has been obsessed with cucumbers since his youth. He began using social media actively in 2021. He first became known on social media for his kimchi and cold noodle-focused content, but became more widely known for his first cucumber salad reel utilizing an entire cucumber, which garnered 12 million views. Since then, Moffitt has focused on cucumber salad-focused content utilizing a full cucumber, often in a Korean style. He sometimes utilizes his family's homegrown cucumbers in his recipes.

He has been dubbed "cucumber boy", "cucumber guy" and "cucumber king" by his followers. Some of his cucumber recipes have garnered almost 30 million views, and have been imitated by people including Giada De Laurentiis and Alix Earle. Moffitt is also known for his frequent use of MSG in his cucumber recipes and discussion of mandoline safety tips. According to the Iceland Horticulturists' Sales Company and Icelandic news reports, his viral videos were also responsible for a cucumber shortage in Iceland.

Moffitt partnered with La La Land Kind Cafe for a cucumber salad release and is also a brand ambassador for produce company Del Fresco Pure. He also runs a YouTube channel called GRAND MAAT, where he meets Korean grandmothers and tries home-cooked Korean cuisine. He won the Webby Award for Most Viral in 2025. He also was ranked #50 in Forbes Top Creators in 2026.

== See also ==
- List of Webby Award winners
