= Tomato knife =

Kitchen utensil

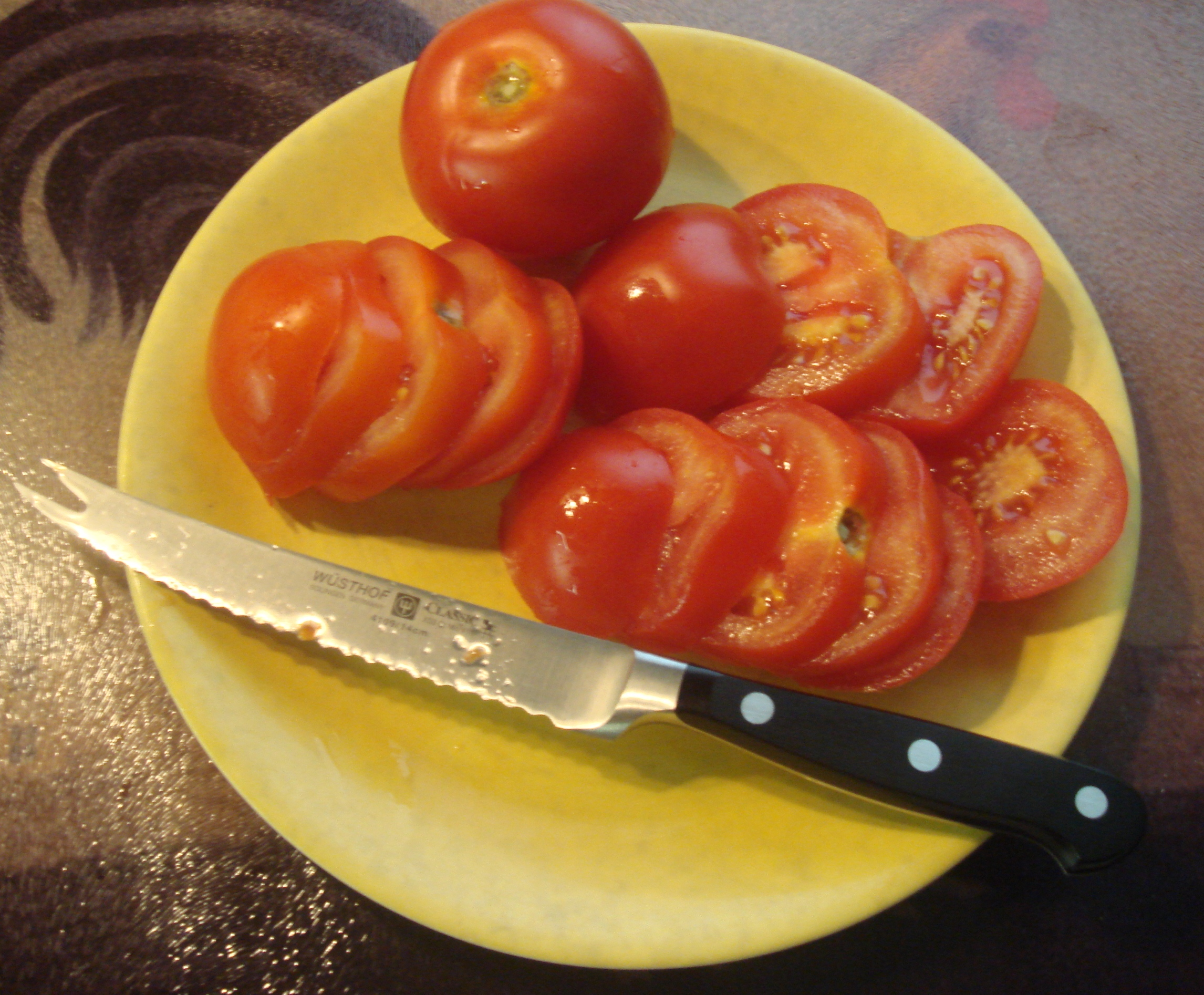
Wüsthof tomato knife with tomatoes

A tomato knife is a small serrated kitchen knife designed to slice through tomatoes. The serrated edge allows the knife to penetrate the tomatoes’ skin quickly and with a minimum of pressure without crushing the flesh. Many tomato knives have forked tips that allow the user to lift and move the tomato slices after they have been cut.

Serrations are not required to cut tomatoes; a sharp straight blade is effective. Serrations allow the knife to cut tomatoes and other foods even when dull: most of the cutting takes place in the serrations themselves. Some knives have serrations on both sides allowing easy slicing for both left-handed and right-handed users. Bread knives and some steak knives are similarly serrated.

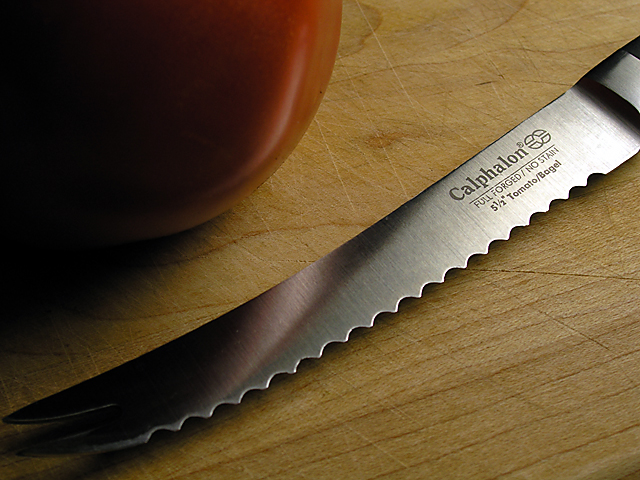
Calphalon tomato/bagel knife

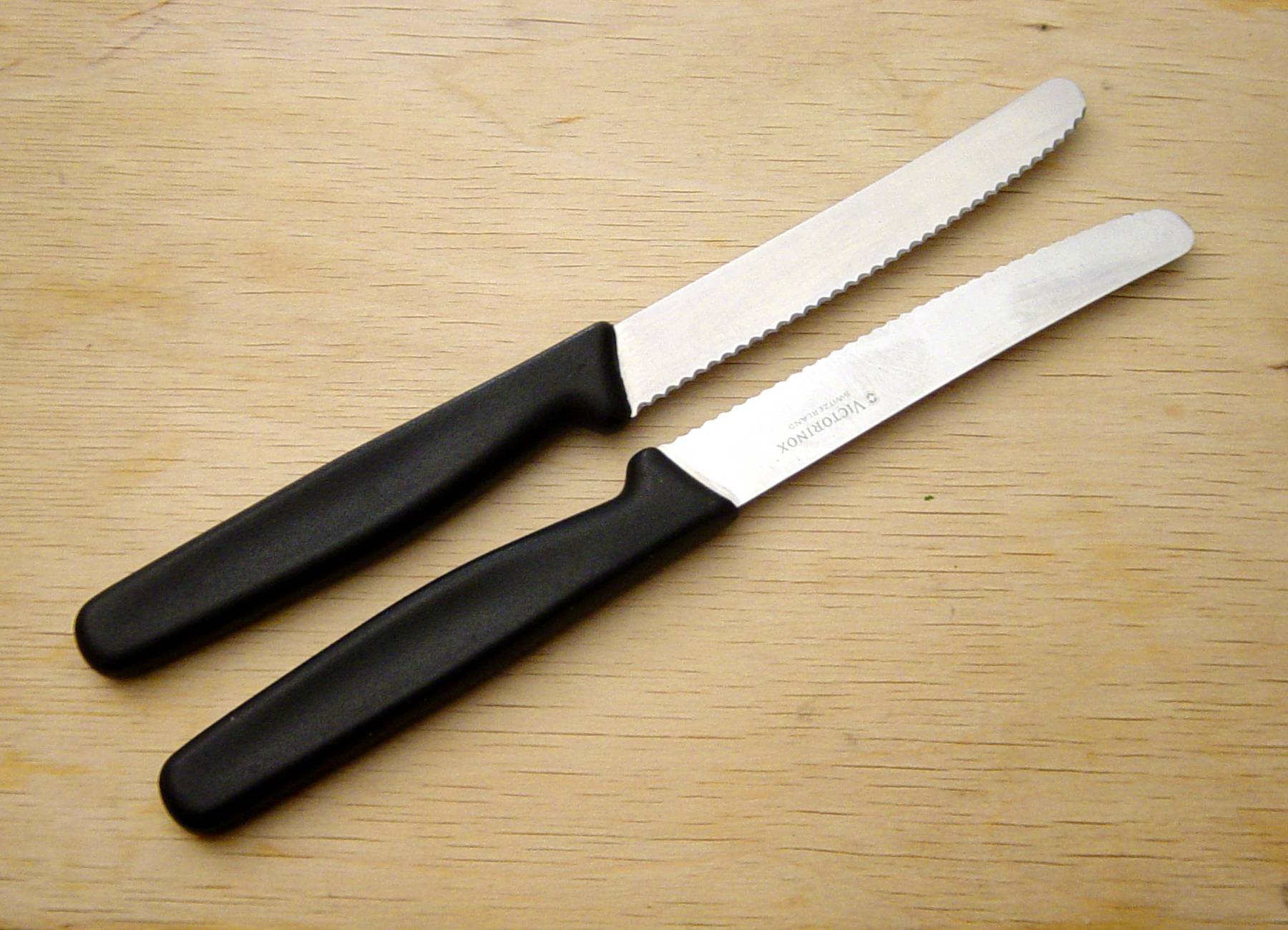
Victorinox tomato knives

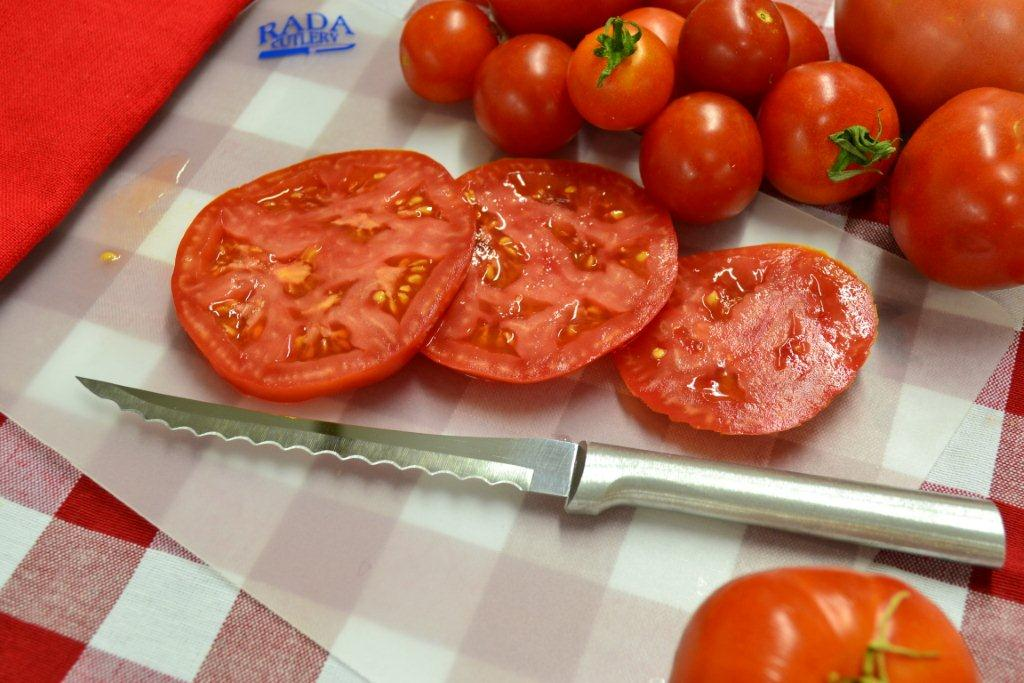
Tomato knife (serrated)

== See also ==
- Tomato slicer
