= Healthy diet =

Type of diet

Average per capita vegetable intake vs minimum recommended guidelines

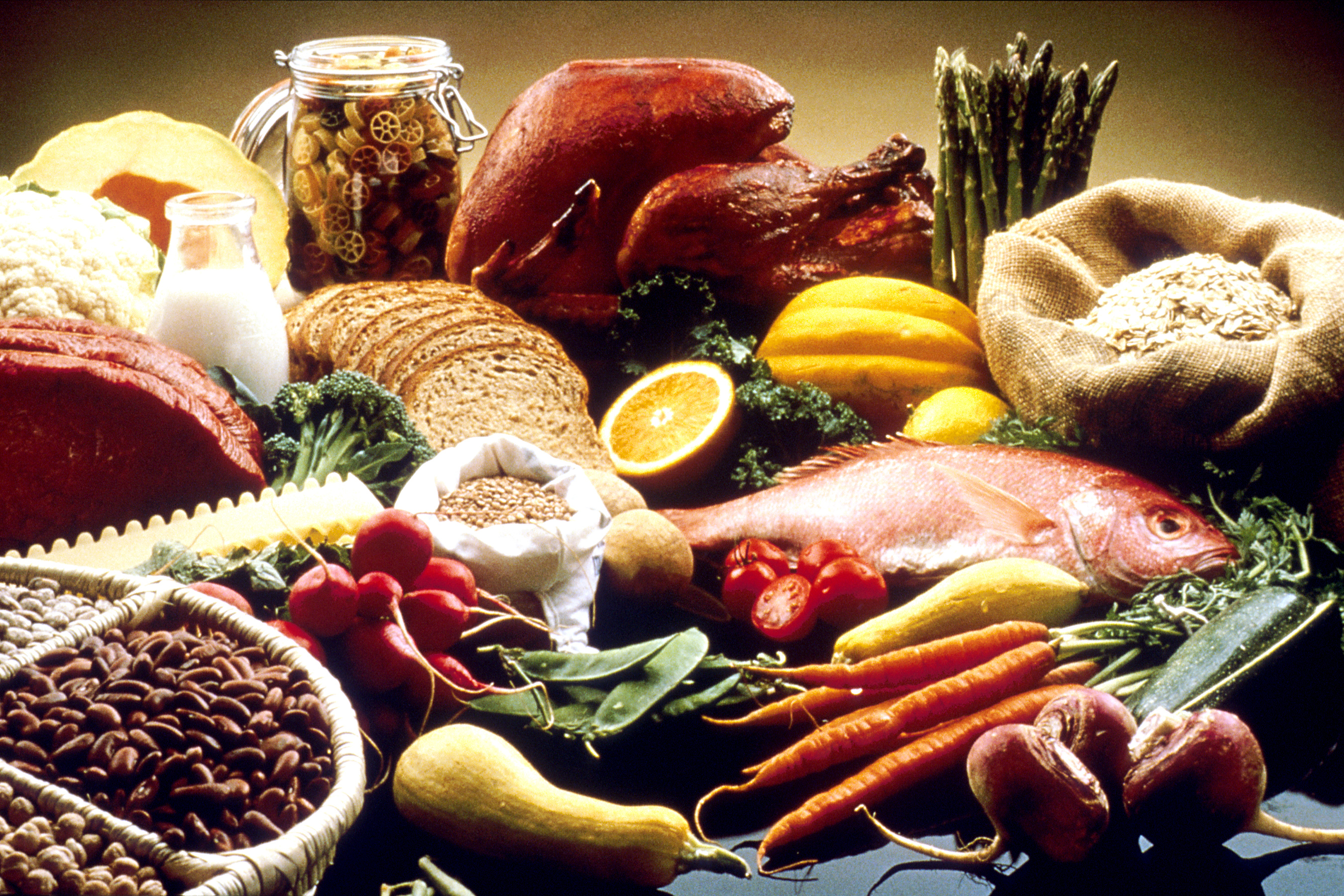
Some healthy foods including beans, grains, cauliflower, cantaloupe, pasta, bread, orange, turkey, fish, carrots, turnips, zucchini, snowpeas, string beans, radishes, asparagus, summer squash, lean beef, tomatoes, and potatoes

A healthy diet (or healthful diet) is a diet that maintains or improves overall health, providing the body with essential nutrition: water, macronutrients such as protein, micronutrients such as vitamins, and adequate fibre and food energy.

A healthy diet may contain fruits, vegetables, and whole grains, and may include little to no ultra-processed foods or sweetened beverages. The requirements for a healthy diet can be met from a variety of plant-based and animal-based foods, although additional sources of vitamin B_{12} are needed for those following a vegan diet. Various nutrition guides are published by medical and governmental institutions to educate individuals on what they should be eating to be healthy. Not only advertising may drive preferences towards unhealthy foods. To reverse this trend, consumers should be informed, motivated and empowered to choose healthy diets. Nutrition facts labels are also mandatory in some countries to allow consumers to choose between foods based on the components relevant to health. The lack of a healthy diet contributes massively to the global disease burden, imposing immense health, economic and social costs.

In 2025 only 30.8% of children aged 6 to 23 months, and 62.7% of women aged 15 to 49 years, consumed a minimally diverse diet. In 2024, 31.9% of the global population could not afford a healthy diet, compared to 36.9 percent in 2020 and 38.4 percent in 2017. In 2024, unaffordability was the highest in Africa (66.6% of the population), and much lower in Asia (28.1%), Latin America and the Caribbean (27.4%), Oceania (19.6%) and Northern America and Europe (5.0%). This is often a political issue. The Food and Agriculture Organization and the World Health Organization have formulated four core principles of what constitutes healthy diets. According to these two organizations, health diets are:

- Adequate, as they meet, without exceeding, our body's energy and essential nutrient requirements in support of all the many body functions.
- Diverse, as they include various nutritious foods within and across food groups to help secure the sufficient nutrients needed by our bodies.
- Balanced, as they include energy from the three primary sources (protein, fats, and carbohydrates) in a balanced way and foster healthy weight, growth and activity, and to prevent disease.
- Moderate, as they include only small quantities (or none) of foods that may have a negative impact on health, such as highly salty and sugary foods.

Despite the increase in food prices during 2024, the number of people unable to afford a healthy diet in the world fell from 2.76 billion in 2019 to 2.60 billion in 2024. However, the number increased in Africa from 864 million to just over 1 billion in this period (from 64% to 66.6%). In low-income countries, the number increased from 464 million in 2019 to 545 million (72%) in 2024, and in lower-middle-income countries (excluding India), from 791 to 869 million (52%) in the same period. Globally, about one-third of children aged 6 to 23 months and two-thirds of women aged 15 to 49 years achieved minimum dietary diversity.

== Recommendations ==
=== World Health Organization ===
The World Health Organization (WHO) makes the following five recommendations with respect to both populations and individuals:

1. Maintain a healthy weight by eating roughly the same number of calories that your body is using.
2. Limit intake of fats to no more than 30% of total caloric intake, preferring unsaturated fats to saturated fats. Avoid trans fats.
3. Eat at least 400 grams of fruits and vegetables per day (not counting potatoes, sweet potatoes, cassava, and other starchy roots). A healthy diet also contains legumes (e.g. lentils, beans), whole grains, and nuts.
4. Limit the intake of simple sugars to less than 10% of caloric intake (below 5% of calories or 25 grams may be even better).
5. Limit salt/sodium from all sources and ensure that salt is iodized. Less than 5 grams of salt per day can reduce the risk of cardiovascular disease.

The WHO has stated that insufficient vegetables and fruit is the cause of 2.8% of deaths worldwide.

Other WHO recommendations include:

- ensuring that the foods chosen have sufficient vitamins and certain minerals;
- avoiding directly poisonous (e.g. heavy metals) and carcinogenic (e.g. benzene) substances;
- avoiding foods contaminated by human pathogens (e.g. E. coli, tapeworm eggs);
- and replacing saturated fats with polyunsaturated fats in the diet, which can reduce the risk of coronary artery disease and diabetes.

=== United States Department of Agriculture ===
The Dietary Guidelines for Americans by the United States Department of Agriculture (USDA) recommends three healthy patterns of diet, summarized in the table below, for a 2000 kcal diet. These guidelines are increasingly adopted by various groups and institutions for recipe and meal plan development.

The guidelines emphasize both health and environmental sustainability and a flexible approach. The committee that drafted it wrote: "The major findings regarding sustainable diets were that a diet higher in plant-based foods, such as vegetables, fruits, whole grains, legumes, nuts, and seeds, and lower in calories and animal-based foods is more health promoting and is associated with less environmental impact than is the current U.S. diet. This pattern of eating can be achieved through a variety of dietary patterns, including the "Healthy U.S.-style Pattern", the "Healthy Vegetarian Pattern" and the "Healthy Mediterranean-style Pattern". Food group amounts are per day, unless noted per week.

The three healthy patterns
Food group/subgroup (units)	U.S. style	Vegetarian	Med-style
Fruits (cup eq)	2	2	2.5
Vegetables (cup eq)	2.5	2.5	2.5
Dark green	1.5/wk	1.5/wk	1.5/wk
Red/orange	5.5/wk	5.5/wk	5.5/wk
Starchy	5/wk	5/wk	5/wk
Legumes	1.5/wk	3/wk	1.5/wk
Others	4/wk	4/wk	4/wk
Grains (oz eq)	6	6.5	6
Whole	3	3.5	3
Refined	3	3	3
Dairy (cup eq)	3	3	2
Protein Foods (oz eq)	5.5	3.5	6.5
Meat (red and processed)	12.5/wk	–	12.5/wk
Poultry	10.5/wk	–	10.5/wk
Seafood	8/wk	–	15/wk
Eggs	3/wk	3/wk	3/wk
Nuts/seeds	4/wk	7/wk	4/wk
Processed Soy (including tofu)	0.5/wk	8/wk	0.5/wk
Oils (grams)	27	27	27
Solid fats limit (grams)	18	21	17
Added sugars limit (grams)	30	36	29

=== American Heart Association / World Cancer Research Fund / American Institute for Cancer Research ===
The American Heart Association, World Cancer Research Fund, and American Institute for Cancer Research recommend a diet that consists mostly of unprocessed plant foods, with emphasis on a wide range of whole grains, legumes, and non-starchy vegetables and fruits. This healthy diet includes a wide range of non-starchy vegetables and fruits which provide different colors including red, green, yellow, white, purple, and orange. The recommendations note that tomato cooked with oil, allium vegetables like garlic, and cruciferous vegetables like cauliflower, provide some protection against cancer. This healthy diet is low in energy density, which may protect against weight gain and associated diseases. Finally, limiting consumption of sugary drinks, limiting energy-rich foods, including "fast foods" and red meat, and avoiding processed meats improves health and longevity. Overall, researchers and medical policymakers conclude that this healthy diet can reduce the risk of chronic disease and cancer.

It is recommended that children consume 25 grams or less of added sugar (100 calories) per day. Other recommendations include no extra sugars in those under two years old and less than one soft drink per week. As of 2017, decreasing total fat is no longer recommended, but instead, the recommendation to lower risk of cardiovascular disease is to increase consumption of monounsaturated fats and polyunsaturated fats, while decreasing consumption of saturated fats.

=== Harvard School of Public Health ===
The Nutrition Source of Harvard School of Public Health (HSPH) makes the following dietary recommendations:

- Eat healthy fats: healthy fats are necessary and beneficial for health. HSPH "recommends the opposite of the low-fat message promoted for decades by the USDA" and "does not set a maximum on the percentage of calories people should get each day from healthy sources of fat." Healthy fats include polyunsaturated and monounsaturated fats, found in vegetable oils, nuts, seeds, and fish. Foods containing trans fats are to be avoided, while foods high in saturated fats like red meat, butter, cheese, ice cream, coconut and palm oil negatively impact health and should be limited.
- Eat healthy protein: the majority of protein should come from plant sources when possible: lentils, beans, nuts, seeds, whole grains; avoid processed meats like bacon.
- Eat mostly vegetables, fruit, and whole grains.
- Drink water. Consume sugary beverages, juices, and milk only in moderation. Artificially sweetened beverages contribute to weight gain because sweet drinks cause cravings. 100% fruit juice is high in calories. The ideal amount of milk and calcium is not known today.
- Pay attention to salt intake from commercially prepared foods: most of the dietary salt comes from processed foods, "not from salt added to cooking at home or even from salt added at the table before eating."
- Vitamins and minerals: must be obtained from food because they are not produced in our body. They are provided by a diet containing healthy fats, healthy protein, vegetables, fruit, milk and whole grains.
- Pay attention to the carbohydrates package: the type of carbohydrates in the diet is more important than the amount of carbohydrates. Good sources for carbohydrates are vegetables, fruits, beans, and whole grains. Avoid sugared sodas, 100% fruit juice, artificially sweetened drinks, and other highly processed food.

Other than nutrition, the guide recommends staying active and maintaining a healthy body weight.

=== Others ===
David L. Katz, who reviewed the most prevalent popular diets in 2014, noted:

The weight of evidence strongly supports a theme of healthful eating while allowing for variations on that theme. A diet of minimally processed foods close to nature, predominantly plants, is decisively associated with health promotion and disease prevention and is consistent with the salient components of seemingly distinct dietary approaches. Efforts to improve public health through diet are forestalled not for want of knowledge about the optimal feeding of Homo sapiens but for distractions associated with exaggerated claims, and our failure to convert what we reliably know into what we routinely do. Knowledge in this case is not, as of yet, power; would that it were so.

Marion Nestle expresses the mainstream view among scientists who study nutrition:

The basic principles of good diets are so simple that I can summarize them in just ten words: eat less, move more, eat lots of fruits and vegetables. For additional clarification, a five-word modifier helps: go easy on junk foods. Follow these precepts and you will go a long way toward preventing the major diseases of our overfed society—coronary heart disease, certain cancers, diabetes, stroke, osteoporosis, and a host of others.... These precepts constitute the bottom line of what seem to be the far more complicated dietary recommendations of many health organizations and national and international governments—the forty-one "key recommendations" of the 2005 Dietary Guidelines, for example. ... Although you may feel as though advice about nutrition is constantly changing, the basic ideas behind my four precepts have not changed in half a century. And they leave plenty of room for enjoying the pleasures of food.

Historically, a healthy diet was defined as a diet comprising more than 55% of carbohydrates, less than 30% of fat and about 15% of proteins. This view is currently shifting towards a more comprehensive framing of dietary needs as a global need of various nutrients with complex interactions, instead of per nutrient type needs.

In 2022, the American Society for Preventive Cardiology defined a healthful dietary pattern as a diet consisting predominantly of fruits, vegetables, legumes, nuts, seeds, plant protein and fatty fish with reduced consumption of saturated fat, salt and ultra-processed food. The National Heart Foundation of Australia's "Healthy Eating Principles" include plenty of fruit, vegetables and whole grains with a variety of protein sources such as fish and seafood, lean poultry with a restriction on red meat.

== Conditions associated with poor diet ==
The lack of a healthy diet contributes massively to the global disease burden, imposing immense health, economic and social costs.

=== Diabetes ===
A healthy diet in combination with being active can help those with diabetes keep their blood sugar in check. The US CDC advises individuals with diabetes to plan for regular, balanced meals and to include more nonstarchy vegetables, reduce added sugars and refined grains, and focus on whole foods instead of highly processed foods. Generally, people with diabetes and those at risk are encouraged to increase their fiber intake.

=== Hypertension ===
A low-sodium diet is beneficial for people with high blood pressure. A 2008 Cochrane review concluded that a long-term (more than four weeks) low-sodium diet lowers blood pressure, both in people with hypertension (high blood pressure) and in those with normal blood pressure.

The DASH diet (Dietary Approaches to Stop Hypertension) is a diet promoted by the National Heart, Lung, and Blood Institute (part of the NIH, a United States government organization) to control hypertension. A major feature of the plan is limiting intake of sodium, and the diet also generally encourages the consumption of nuts, whole grains, fish, poultry, fruits, and vegetables while lowering the consumption of red meats, sweets, and sugar. It is also "rich in potassium, magnesium, and calcium, as well as protein".

The Mediterranean diet, which includes limiting consumption of red meat and using olive oil in cooking, has also been shown to improve cardiovascular outcomes.

=== Obesity ===
It is estimated that more than 675 million adults are obese. Healthy diets in combination with physical exercise can be used by people who are overweight or obese to lose weight, although this approach is not by itself an effective long-term treatment for obesity and is primarily effective for only a short period (up to one year), after which some of the weight is typically regained. A meta-analysis found no difference between diet types (low-fat, low-carbohydrate, and low-calorie), with a 2–4 kilograms (4.4–8.8 lb) weight loss. This level of weight loss is by itself insufficient to move a person from an 'obese' body mass index (BMI) category to a 'normal' BMI.

=== Gluten-related disorders ===
Gluten, a mixture of proteins found in wheat and related grains including barley, rye, oat, and all their species and hybrids (such as spelt, kamut, and triticale), causes health problems for those with gluten-related disorders, including celiac disease, non-celiac gluten sensitivity, gluten ataxia, dermatitis herpetiformis, and wheat allergy. In these people, the gluten-free diet is the only available treatment.

=== Epilepsy ===
The ketogenic diet is a treatment to reduce epileptic seizures for adults and children when managed by a health care team.

=== Mental disorders ===
Nutritional psychiatry is the emerging scientific field dedicated to exploring the relationship between the effects of diet and mental health. There is ongoing research about how poor diets directly influence the development of cognitive decline, as well as symptoms of psychiatric conditions, such as ADHD, depression, inflammation, anxiety, bipolar disorder, and schizophrenia. There is also research about how specific diets, those that focus on maintaining balanced nutrition, could be potential avenues for treatment of mental health conditions. A healthy diet provides the necessary micro and macronutrients that serve as the building blocks for curating stable mental health.

== Research ==
Preliminary research indicated that a diet high in fruit and vegetables may decrease the risk of cardiovascular disease and death, but not cancer. Eating a healthy diet and getting enough exercise can maintain body weight within the normal range and reduce the risk of obesity in most people. A 2021 scientific review of evidence on diets for lowering the risk of atherosclerosis found that:

low consumption of salt and foods of animal origin, and increased intake of plant-based foods—whole grains, fruits, vegetables, legumes, and nuts—are linked with reduced atherosclerosis risk. The same applies for the replacement of butter and other animal/tropical fats with olive oil and other unsaturated-fat-rich oil. [...] With regard to meat, new evidence differentiates processed and red meat—both associated with increased CVD risk—from poultry, showing a neutral relationship with CVD for moderate intakes. [...] New data endorse the replacement of most high glycemic index (GI) foods with both whole grain and low GI cereal foods.

Scientific research is also investigating impacts of nutrition on health- and lifespans beyond any specific range of diseases.

Research suggests that increasing adherence to Mediterranean diet patterns is associated with a reduction in total and cause-specific mortality, extending health- and lifespan. Research is identifying the key beneficial components of the Mediterranean diet. Studies suggest dietary changes are a factor of national relative rises in life-span. Moreover, not only do the components of diets matter but the total caloric content and eating patterns may also impact health – dietary restriction such as caloric restriction is considered to be potentially healthy to include in eating patterns in various ways in terms of health- and lifespan.

== Barriers to a healthy diet ==
Share of population that cannot afford a healthy diet

Economic and non-economic drivers determine the consumption of healthy diets, including the cost of the items that shape such diets. Agrifood systems and food environments shape the availability of the food items that make up a healthy diet.

Share of population that cannot afford a calorie sufficient diet

Share of population that cannot afford a nutrient adequate diet

=== Affordability ===
The UN Food and Agriculture Organization estimates that in 2023 40% of the world population, 2.8 billion couldn't afford a healthy diet. 35.5% of people in the world (2.83 billion) were unable to afford a healthy diet in 2022, compared with 36.5% (2.88 billion) in 2021. Low-income countries having the largest percentage of the population that is unable to afford a healthy diet (71.5 percent) compared with lower-middle-income countries (52.6 percent), upper-middle-income countries (21.5 percent). Despite the increase in food prices during 2024, the number of people unable to afford a healthy diet in the world fell from 2.76 billion in 2019 to 2.60 billion in 2024. However, the number increased in Africa from 864 million to just over 1 billion in this period (from 64% to 66.6%). In low-income countries, the number increased from 464 million in 2019 to 545 million (72%) in 2024, and in lower-middle-income countries (excluding India), from 791 to 869 million (52%) in the same period. Globally, about one-third of children aged 6 to 23 months and two-thirds of women aged 15 to 49 years achieved minimum dietary diversity Post-farm gate activities account for 70% to 75% of what consumers pay, with up to 40% of value chain costs accumulating in midstream processing, logistics and wholesale.

In 2025, the global average cost of a healthy diet (CoHD) (4.28 PPP dollars) was roughly 40% higher than the international extreme poverty line of 3 purchasing power parity (PPP) dollars. Latin America and the Caribbean had the highest CoHD, while Northern America, Europe and Oceania had the lowest. Animal source foods are, on average, the most expensive group (especially in Africa), but this is not the case in Latin America and the Caribbean, where vegetables are the highest-cost group.

Cost of a healthy diet (2024)

Cost of a healthy diet by region (2024)

The cost of basic starchy staples is consistently lower than that of more nutrient-dense food groups.

The number of people unable to afford a healthy diet is on the rise in low-income countries and decreasing in other country income group (2026).

Cost of food groups by region, 2021

The proportion of people unable to afford a healthy diet in the various regions has evolved differently from 2017 to 2025.

Proportion of the population unable to afford a healthy diet by region

=== Unhealthy diets ===
An unhealthy diet is a major risk factor for a number of chronic diseases including: high blood pressure, high cholesterol, diabetes, abnormal blood lipids, overweight/obesity, cardiovascular diseases, and cancer. Estimates indicate that, each year, non-communicable diseases (NCDs) such as diabetes and cardiovascular disease are responsible for 41 million deaths – almost two-thirds of all deaths globally. The World Health Organization has estimated that 2.7 million deaths each year are attributable to a diet low in fruit and vegetables during the 21st century. At least 1.2 billion women are low of vitamins and minerals, which increases the risk of being exposed to chronic fatigue, low resistance to infections and birth defects in their offspring.

Globally, such diets are estimated to cause about 19% of gastrointestinal cancer, 31% of ischemic heart disease, and 11% of strokes, thus making it one of the leading preventable causes of death worldwide, and the 4th leading risk factor for any disease. As an example, the Western pattern diet is "rich in red meat, dairy products, processed and artificially sweetened foods, and salt, with minimal intake of fruits, vegetables, fish, legumes, and whole grains," contrasted by the Mediterranean diet which is associated with less morbidity and mortality.

Dietary patterns that lead to non-communicable diseases generate productivity losses. A true cost accounting (TCA) assessment on the hidden impacts of agrifood systems estimated that unhealthy dietary patterns generate more than USD 9 trillion in health-related hidden costs in 2020, which is 73 percent of the total quantified hidden costs of global agrifood systems (USD 12.7 trillion). Globally, the average productivity losses per person from dietary intake is equivalent to 7 percent of GDP purchasing power parity (PPP) in 2020; low-income countries report the lowest value (4 percent), while other income categories report 7 percent or higher.

=== Fad diet ===
Some publicized diets, often referred to as fad diets, make exaggerated claims of fast weight loss or other health advantages, such as longer life or detoxification without clinical evidence; many fad diets are based on highly restrictive or unusual food choices. Celebrity endorsements (including celebrity doctors) are frequently associated with such diets, and the individuals who develop and promote these programs often profit considerably.

=== Public health ===
Proportion of the population unable to afford a healthy diet (2024)

Percentage of children aged 6 to 23 months achieving minimum dietary diversity by region

Consumers are generally aware of the elements of a healthy diet, but find nutrition labels and diet advice in popular media confusing.

Vending machines are criticized for being avenues of entry into schools for junk food promoters, but there is little in the way of regulation and it is difficult for most people to properly analyze the real merits of a company referring to itself as "healthy." The Committee of Advertising Practice in the United Kingdom launched a proposal to limit media advertising for food and soft drink products high in fat, salt, or sugar. The British Heart Foundation released its own government-funded advertisements, labeled "Food4Thought", which were targeted at children and adults to discourage unhealthy habits of consuming junk food.

From a psychological and cultural perspective, a healthier diet may be difficult to achieve for people with poor eating habits. This may be due to tastes acquired in childhood and preferences for sugary, salty, and fatty foods. In 2018, the UK chief medical officer recommended that sugar and salt be taxed to discourage consumption. The UK government 2020 Obesity Strategy encourages healthier choices by restricting point-of-sale promotions of less-healthy foods and drinks.

The effectiveness of population-level health interventions has included food pricing strategies, mass media campaigns and worksite wellness programs. One peso per liter of sugar-sweetened beverages (SSB) price intervention implemented in Mexico produced a 12% reduction in SSB purchasing. Mass media campaigns in Pakistan and the USA aimed at increasing vegetable and fruit consumption found positive changes in dietary behavior. Reviews of the effectiveness of worksite wellness interventions found evidence linking the programs to weight loss and increased fruit and vegetable consumption.

== Other animals ==
Animals that are kept by humans also benefit from a healthy diet, but the requirements of such diets may be very different from the ideal human diet.

== See also ==
- Commercial determinants of health
- Health food trends
- Healthy eating pyramid
- List of diets
- Meals
- Nutritionism
- Nutrition scale
- Nutritional rating systems
- Planetary Health Diet
- Plant-based diet
- Table of food nutrients

== Sources ==
This article incorporates text from a free content work. Licensed under CC BY 4.0 (license statement/permission). Text taken from The State of Food Security and Nutrition in the World 2026, Food and Agriculture Organization of the United Nations.

This article incorporates text from a free content work. Licensed under CC BY 4.0. Text taken from The State of Food Security and Nutrition in the World 2024, FAO, IFAD, UNICEF, WFP and WHO, FAO.

This article incorporates text from a free content work. Licensed under CC BY 4.0 (license statement/permission). Text taken from The State of Food Security and Nutrition in the World 2025, Food and Agriculture Organization of the United Nations.

This article incorporates text from a free content work. Licensed under CC BY 4.0 (license statement/permission). Text taken from World Food and Agriculture – Statistical Yearbook 2025, Food and Agriculture Organization of the United Nations.

This article incorporates text from a free content work. Licensed under CC BY 4.0 (license statement/permission). Text taken from The State of Food Security and Nutrition in the World 2026, Food and Agriculture Organization of the United Nations.
