= Cucumber salad =

Dish

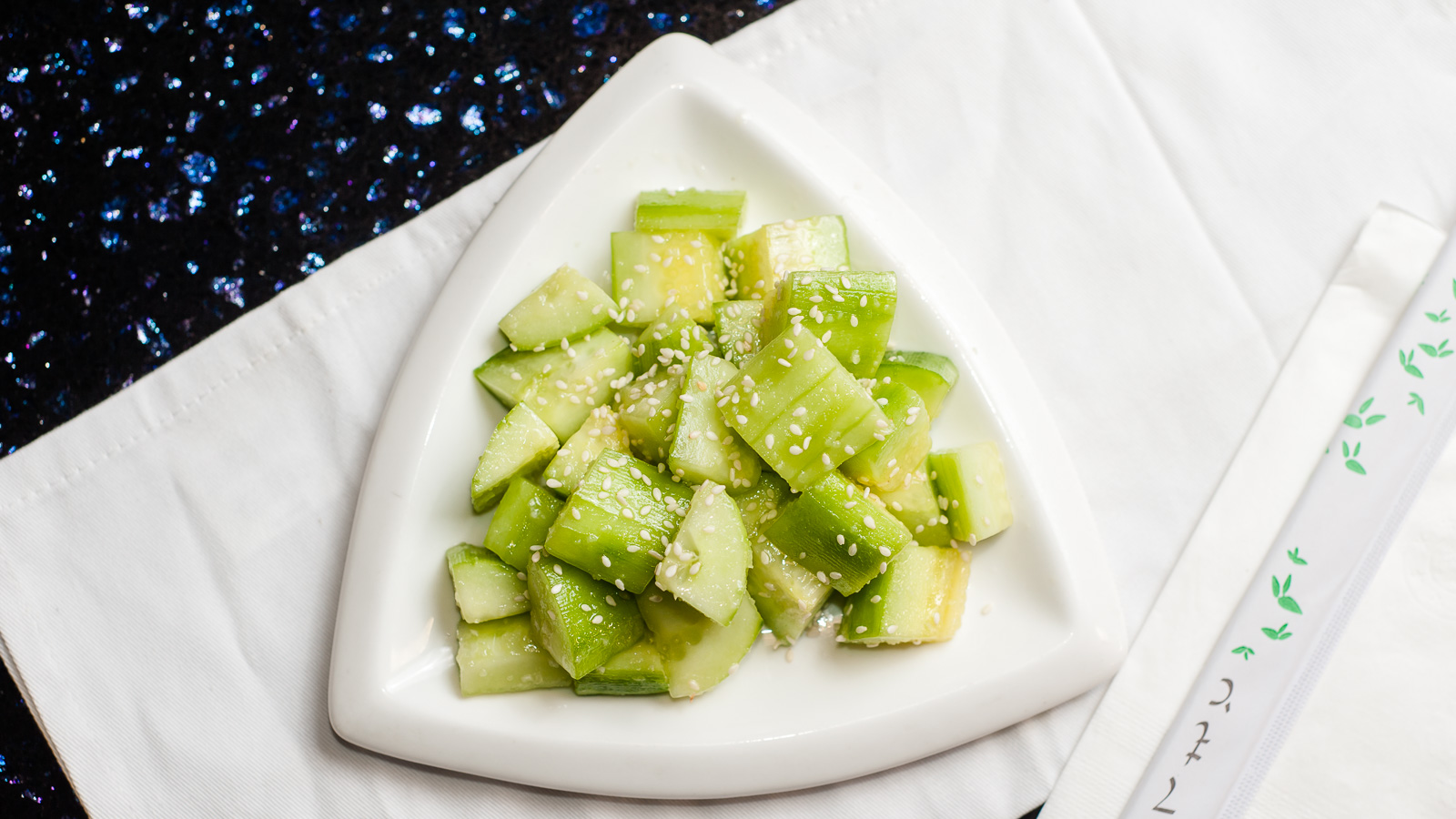
Cucumber salad with sesame seeds

Cucumber salad is a salad dish with cucumber as its main ingredient.

== Varieties ==
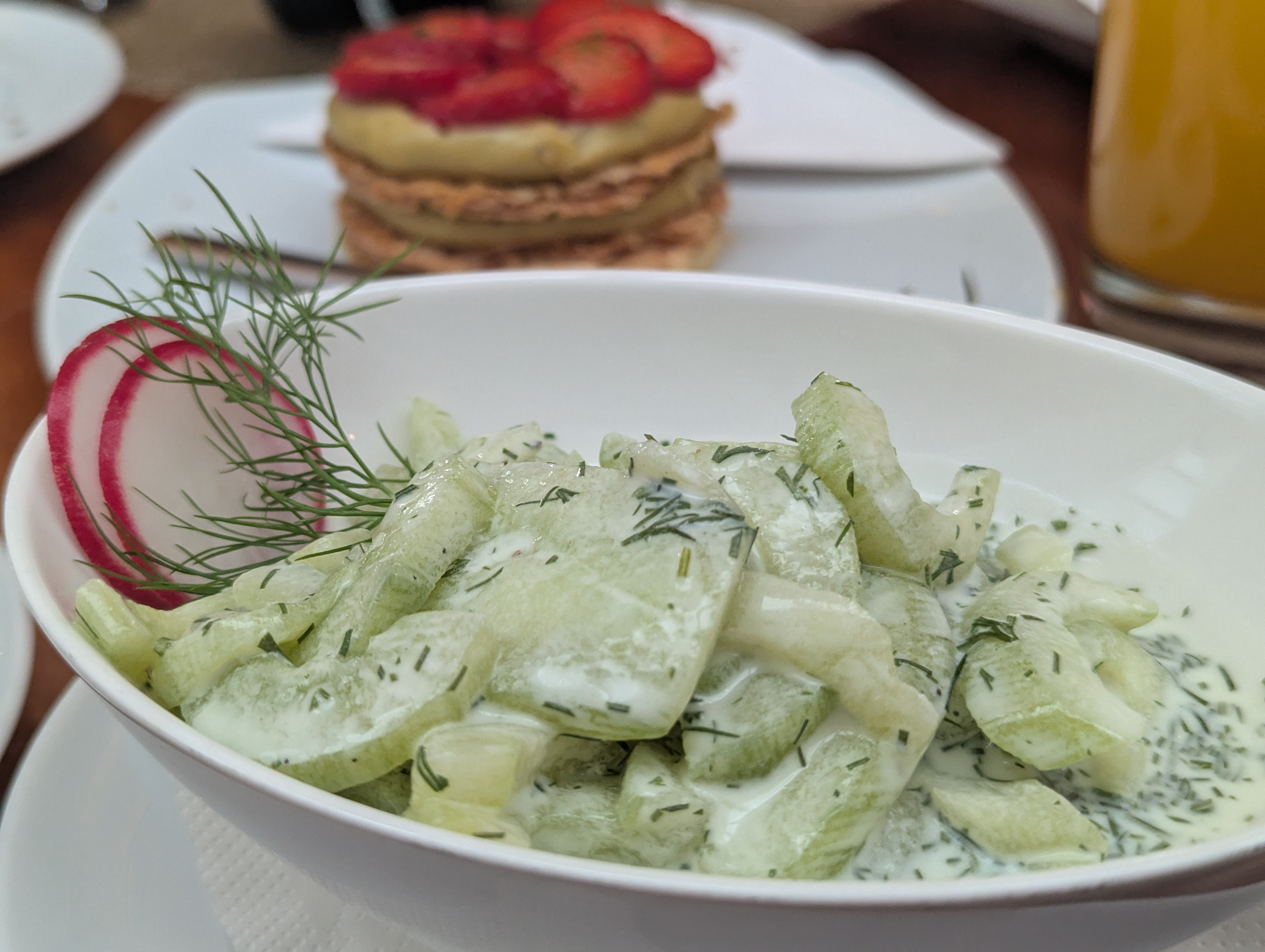
Gurkensalat

The basic form is thin slices of cucumber with a vinaigrette dressing. The salad may include condiments from Chinese cuisine, such as soy sauce and sesame oil, or elements from Thai cuisine such as peanuts, prawns and chili peppers. Australian chef Adam Liaw included "Korean hot chilli flakes" in his recipe for a "simple Korean version". A German cuisine version, a Gurkensalat, may include chives, dill, and sour cream.

== In culture ==
- In A Journey to the Western Islands of Scotland, a narrative of his 1773 journey through Scotland, Samuel Johnson remarked A cucumber should be well sliced, and dressed with pepper and vinegar, and then thrown out, as good for nothing.
- According to some accounts of the history of the telephone, some of the first intelligible words heard over the Reis telephone were Das Pferd frisst keinen Gurkensalat.
- In 2024, Logan Moffitt went viral with a series of cucumber salads made in deli containers.
