= Dashi =

Family of stocks used in Japanese cuisine

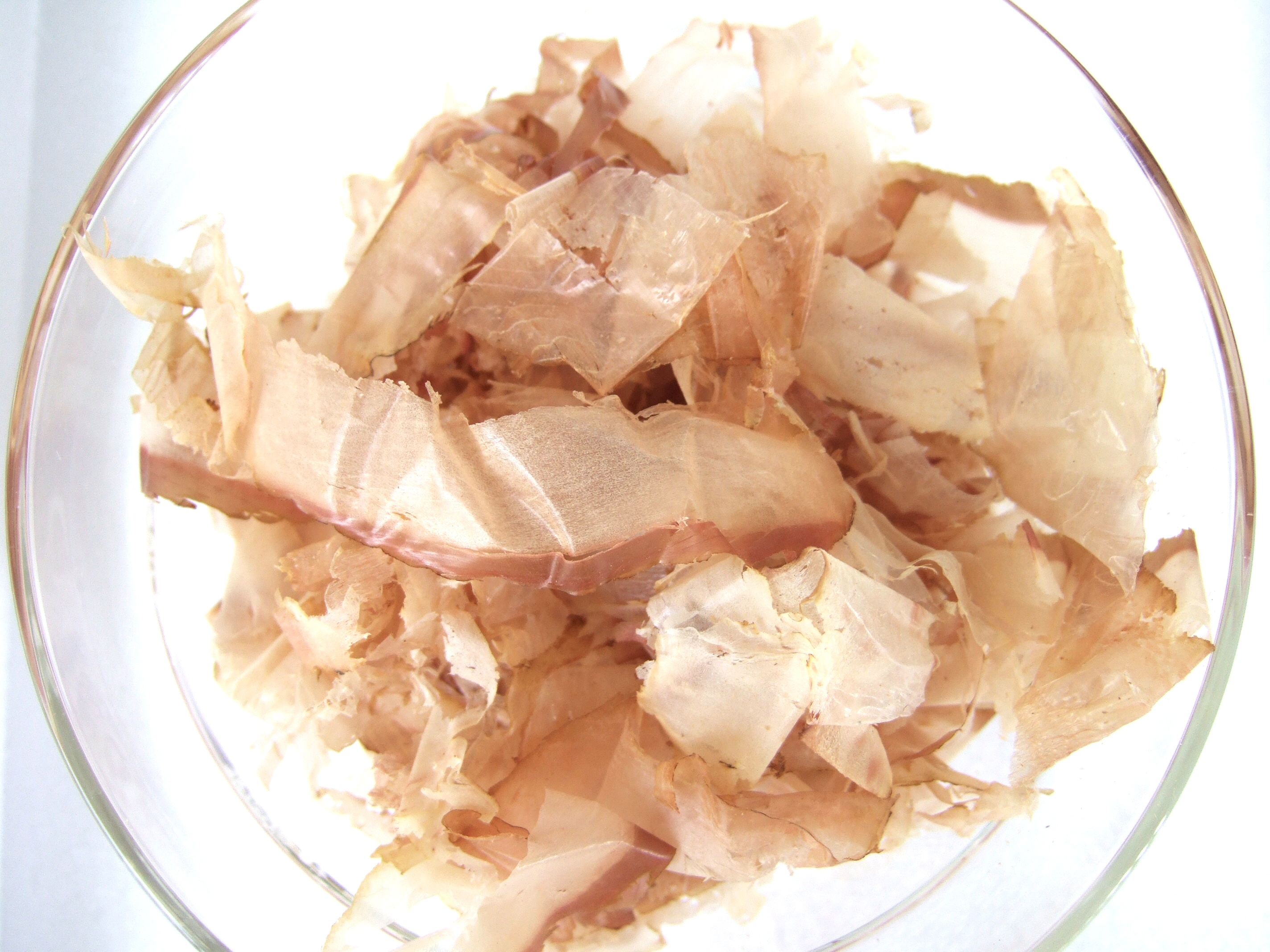
- Katsuobushi shavings before being soaked in the water
- Type: Stock
- Place of origin: Japan
- Variations: Kombu, shiitake, niboshi

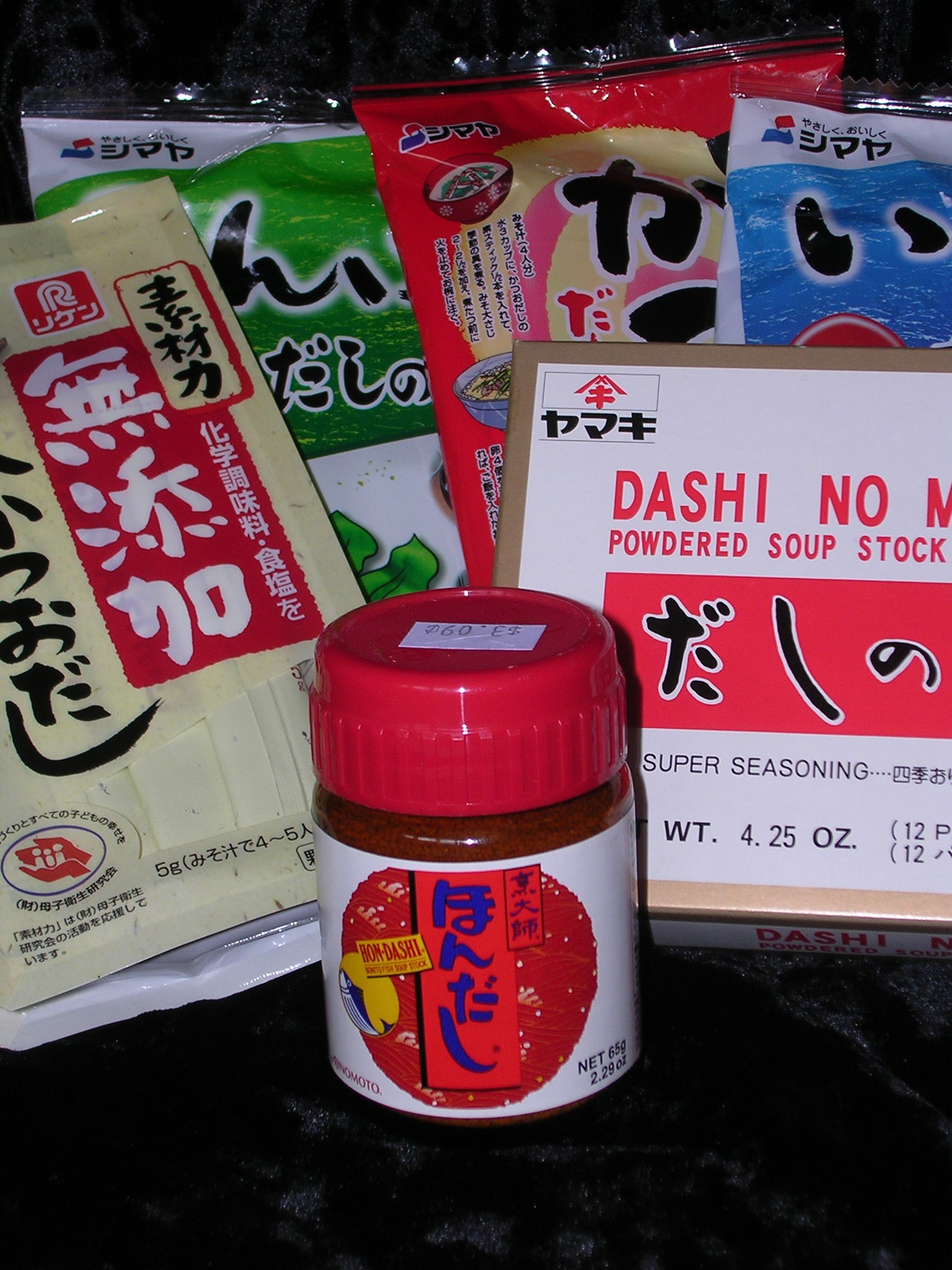
Some common brands of packaged instant dashi

Dashi (出汁, だし) is a family of stocks used in Japanese cuisine. Dashi forms the base for miso soup, clear broth soup, noodle broth soup, and many simmering liquids to accentuate the savory flavor known as umami. Dashi is also mixed into the flour base of some grilled foods like okonomiyaki and takoyaki.

== Preparation ==
The most common form of dashi is a simple broth made by heating water containing kombu (edible kelp) and kezurikatsuo (shavings of katsuobushi—preserved, fermented skipjack tuna—or bonito) to near-boiling, then straining the resultant liquid; dried anchovies or sardines may be substituted. Katsuobushi is especially high in sodium inosinate and kombu is especially high in glutamic acids; combined, they create a synergy of umami.

Granulated or liquid instant dashi largely replaced the homemade product in the second half of the 20th century. Homemade dashi is less popular today, even in Japan. Compared to the taste of homemade dashi, instant dashi tends to have a stronger, less subtle flavor, due to the use of chemical flavor enhancers—glutamates and ribonucleotides.

== Variations ==
Other kinds of dashi are made by soaking kelp, niboshi, or shiitake in water for many hours or by heating them in near-boiling water and straining the resulting broth.

- Kombu dashi is made by soaking or gently simmering kelp in water; soaking is traditional and fit for making baby food while simmering is a more modern practice. Kombu dashi becomes bitter and unpalatable when boiled.
- Niboshi dashi is made by pinching off the heads and entrails of small dried sardines (to prevent bitterness) and soaking the rest in water. Sometimes the heads are used as not everyone finds them to be bitter, and the fish are occasionally toasted to evaporate any volatile unpleasant fishy odors.
- Shiitake dashi is made by soaking dried shiitake mushrooms in water, the liquid gotten from re-hydrating the dried mushrooms are used in making dashi. Dried shiitake is preferred over fresh due to a stronger presence of savory or umami flavors.

== See also ==
- List of soups
