= Kezuriki =

Japanese kitchen utensil

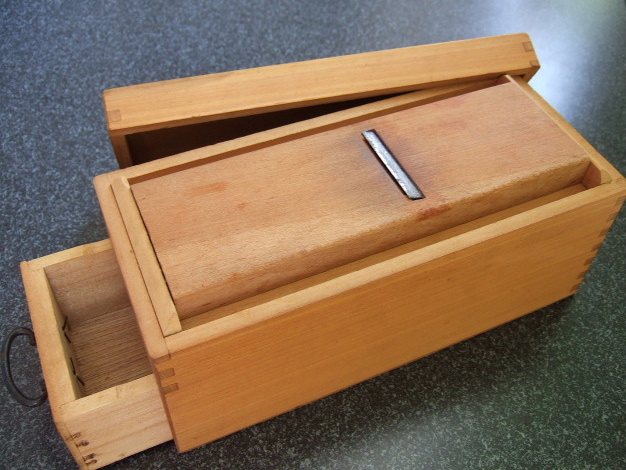
A katsuobushi kezuriki, with its blade cover removed and the collection drawer ajar

A katsuobushi kezuriki (鰹節削り器; かつおぶしけずりき) is a traditional Japanese kitchen utensil, similar to a wood plane or mandoline. It is used to shave katsuobushi, dried blocks of skipjack tuna (katsuo).

The technique used to prepare the cooking ingredient is pulling and pushing a block of katsuobushi across the blade in the device in a back-and-forth movement. The resulting shavings are captured in a wooden drawer at the bottom of the instrument, and retrieved by opening and emptying the shavings that are roughly sorted into two sizes for different uses.

The shavings are a staple of Japanese cuisine. Larger, thicker shavings, called kezurikatsuo (削り鰹; けずりかつお), are boiled with kombu to make dashi. Smaller, thinner shavings, called hanakatsuo (花鰹; はなかつお), are used as a flavoring and as a topping for many Japanese dishes, such as okonomiyaki.

Today, many Japanese households no longer use the katsuobushi kezuriki, opting instead to buy packages of already-shaved hanakatsuo or kezurikikatsuo at supermarkets.

== See also ==
- Mandoline
- Oroshigane, the category of graters used in Japanese cooking
