= Health food trends =

Popularity of healthy foods

There are many types of food trends and fads, not only including weight loss or diets. Recent interest (especially in North America) in health foods, such as quinoa and soy beans, have caused prices to skyrocket and production to vastly increase. This affects the communities in which these foods are grown or produced, and also has environmental impacts. Each food that suddenly has a popularity spike affects those who produce it and the area it comes from.

== Notable examples ==
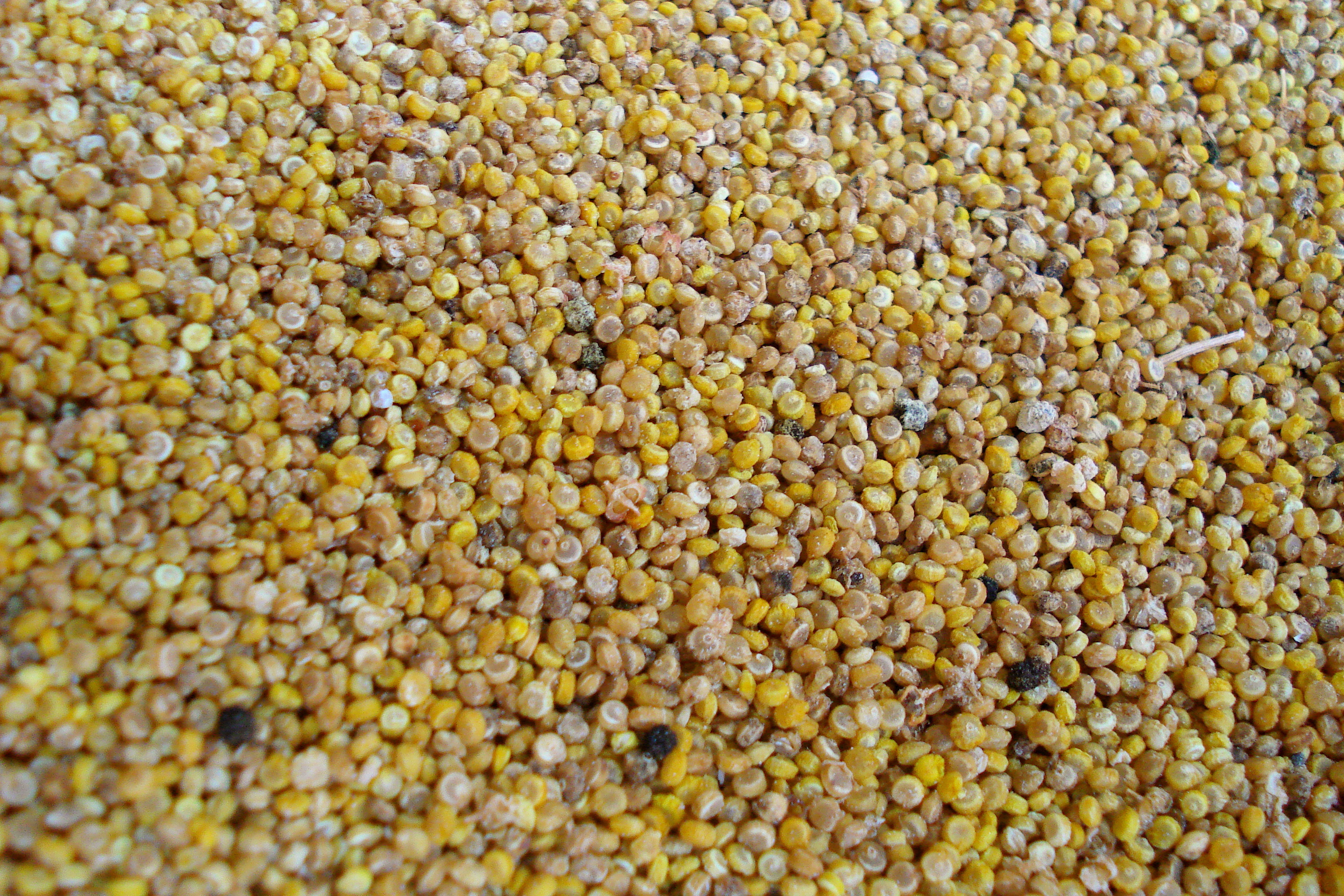
Harvested quinoa seeds

- Quinoa - This "superfood" became popular in North America in 2005 as a high protein, grain-like pseudocereal that's as easy to cook as rice. Its original use centred in South America, where it is easy to grow. This grain made up a large part of the local people's diets and sustained a large population (especially in Peru and Bolivia) with high protein and carbohydrate components. With the recent boom in popularity, the price of the grain has tripled since 2006, making the once staple food of Peruvian and Bolivian villages suddenly very expensive. Farmers are having difficulty being able to eat their own grains, since it is so profitable to sell the majority of it to North American retailers, and the replacement grains the people of the area are using don't have the same nutrient composition as their original quinoa diets.

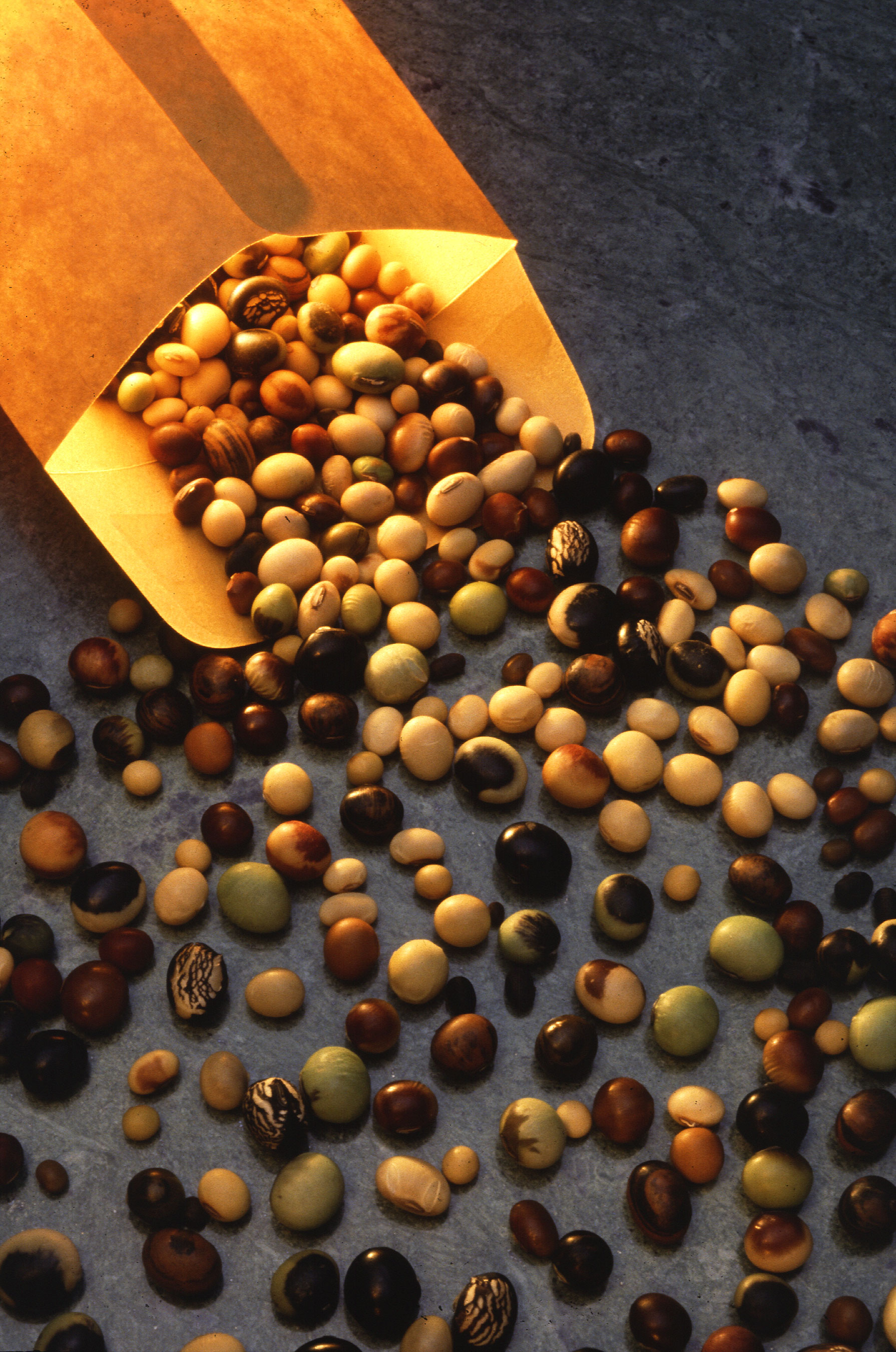
A variety of soybean types.

- Soybeans - Soybeans are being used to produce a huge number of products for vegetarians, vegans, and people with allergies to certain foods. The range of products produced using soybeans is extensive, and includes tofu, soy sauce, lecithin, meat analogue, miso, soy flour, soy milk, tempeh and yuba. They are high in protein, fibre, and calcium and are very filling, making them a popular choice for health-focused consumers. With the increase in demand, new crops have to be planted and the environment soybeans generally need to grow is warm and humid, making the tropics an ideal choice for new plantations. Unfortunately, this is causing large portions of rainforest to be cut down for the productions of these crops, which has a severely negative net carbon effect. In the past 15 years, soy food sales have increased from $1 billion to $5.2 billion, meaning the amount of product being purchased is growing substantially. 97% of the soybeans produced are used for animal feed according to the UN, so the increase in popularity due to consumerism of soy-based products isn't the main cause of the increase in crops and destruction of forests.

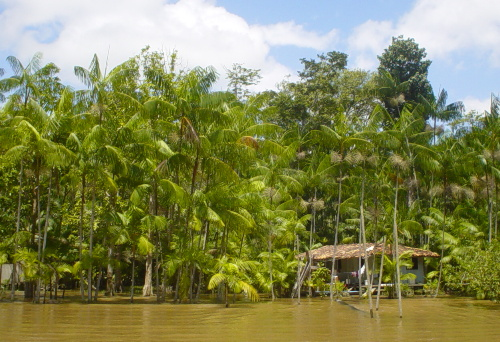
A grove of acai palms in Brazil.

- Acai berry - This antioxidant-packed fruit became popular in 2008 for its health benefits. It contains anthocyanins and flavonoids which act as antioxidants by bonding with free radicals that could otherwise affect cells and cause irregularities. This quality of acai berries made their juice, pulp, and other products made from the fruit very popular in health food circles, and increased their price and production. This fruit requires a warm environment to grow, and is common in Brazil, where acai tree groves are growing with the demand of product.

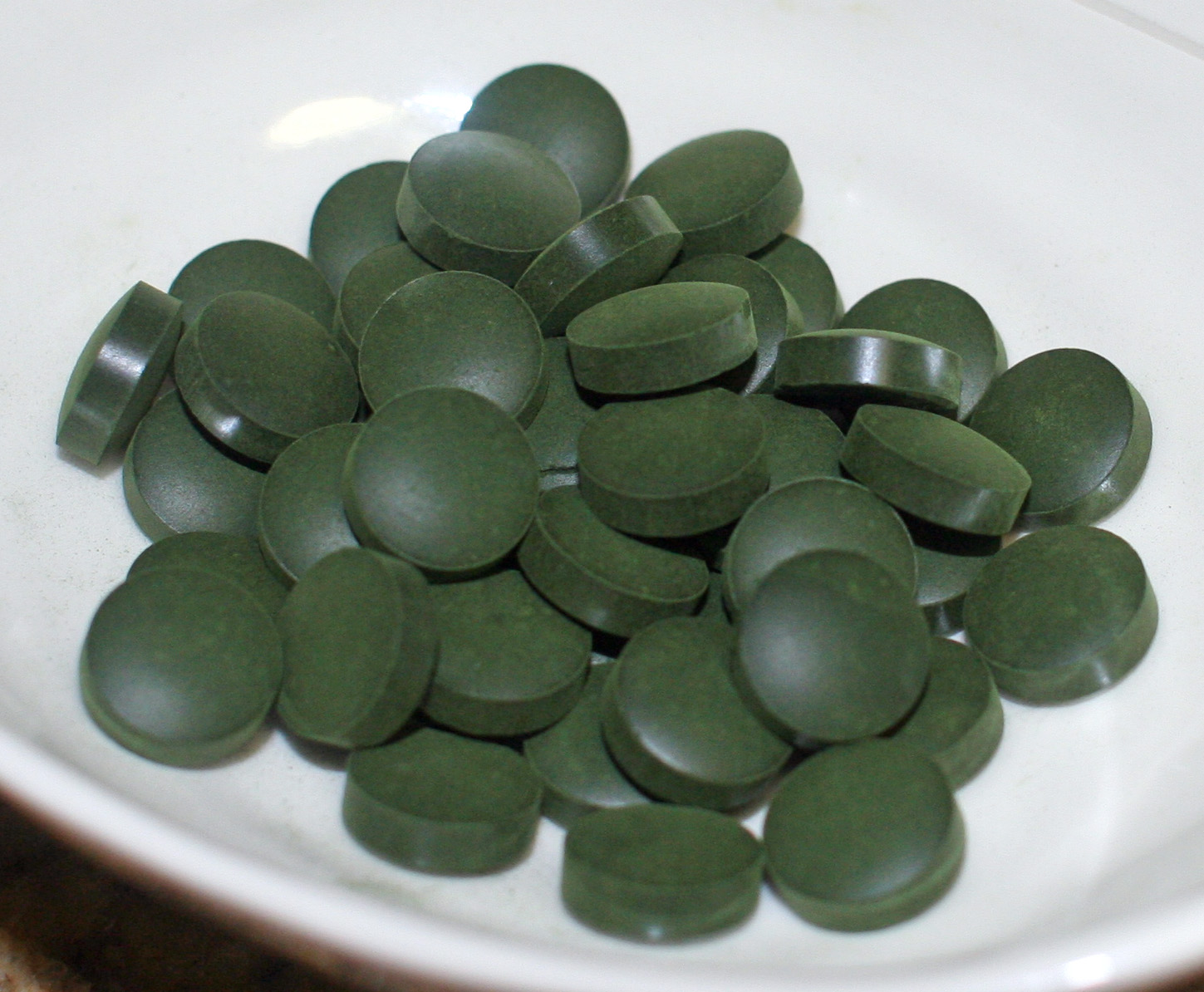
Commercial spirulina tablets

- Spirulina - This species of blue-green algae became popular in the 1980s due to its high protein levels, complete amino acid composition, and the unproven claim that it had the highest chlorophyll content of any plant species. Since spirulina is an algae, it is farmed in ponds in warm environments that allow much cell reproduction and algae population growth. The algae is then filtered out with nets, and dried as a paste in the sun before being ground into a powder and sold as powder or pills.
- Flax seed - The seed derived from a flax plant has many purposes, one being a good source of food. Research of its health benefits can be linked back as far as 3000 B.C. Flax seed today is known for its rich source of omega-3 acids, as well as many other health benefits, these including the reduction of breast cancer, and a decrease in high cholesterol. With this being said, there are still many inclusive tests on all of the health benefits flax seed may give off. One of the most common uses for flax seed is the process of creating an egg replacement, that of which has become more popular as veganism grows in our society. Modern-day vegans have found many substitutes to eggs, but flax seed is one of the most notable.

== See also ==
- Health food
- Health food store
