= Mandoline =

Culinary utensil used for slicing food

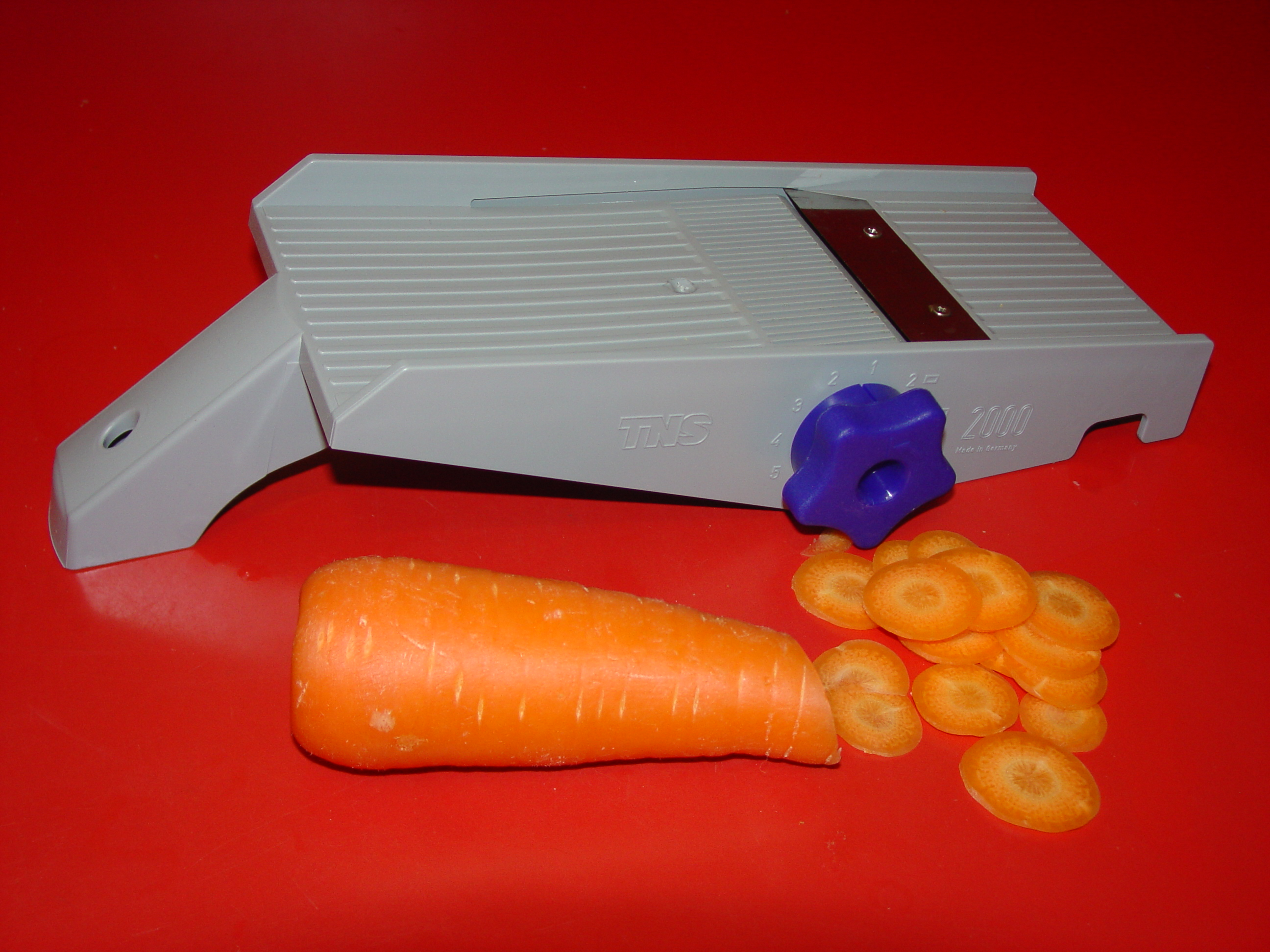
A mandoline used for slicing a carrot

A mandoline (US) or mandolin (British (Note: "mandolin". Oxford English Dictionary (online ed.). Oxford University Press. (Subscription or participating institution membership required.))) /ˌmændəˈliːn, -ˈlɪn/, is a culinary utensil used for slicing and for cutting juliennes; with suitable attachments, it can make crinkle-cuts.

== Design ==
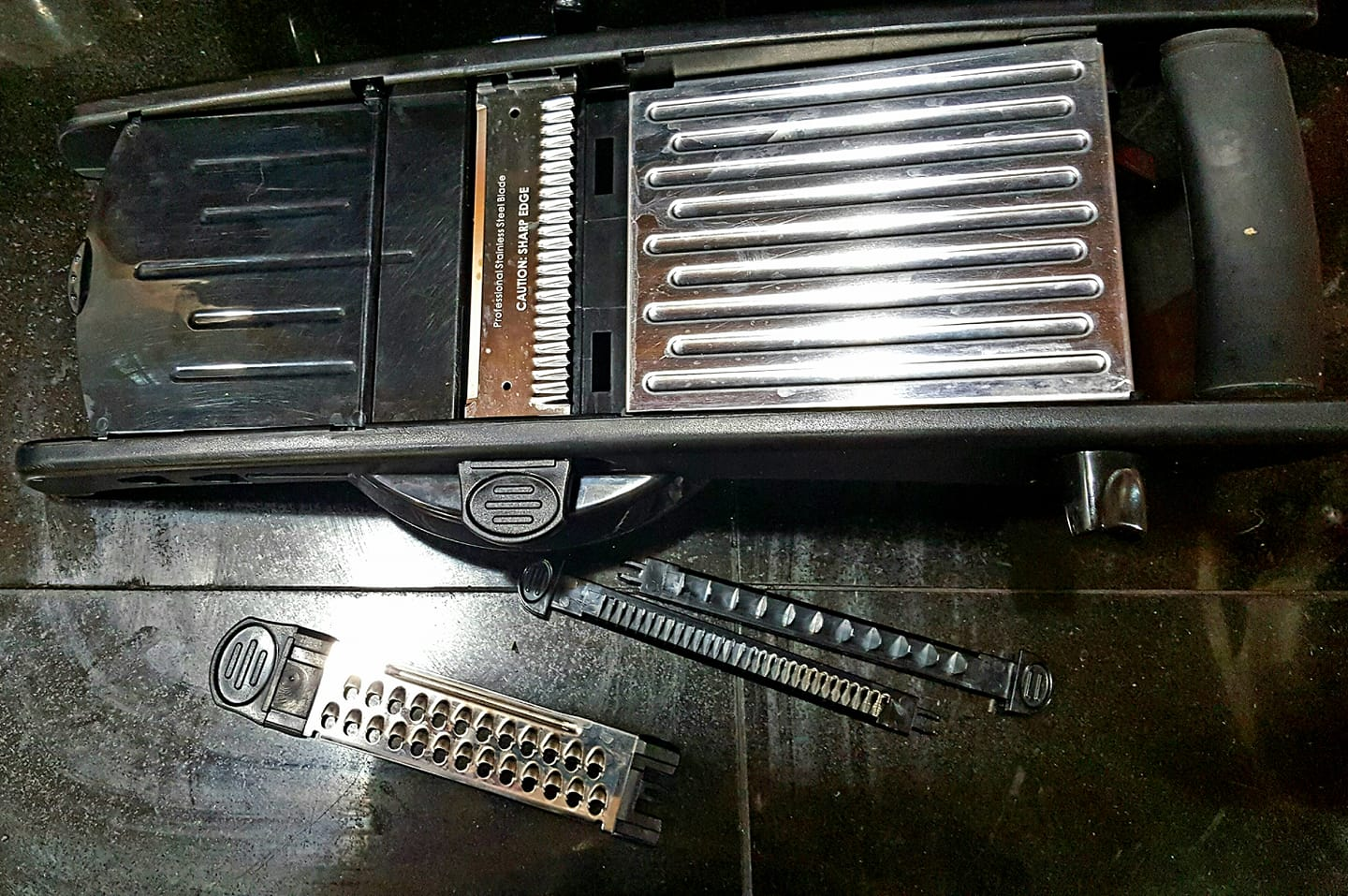
A mandoline with various cutting blades

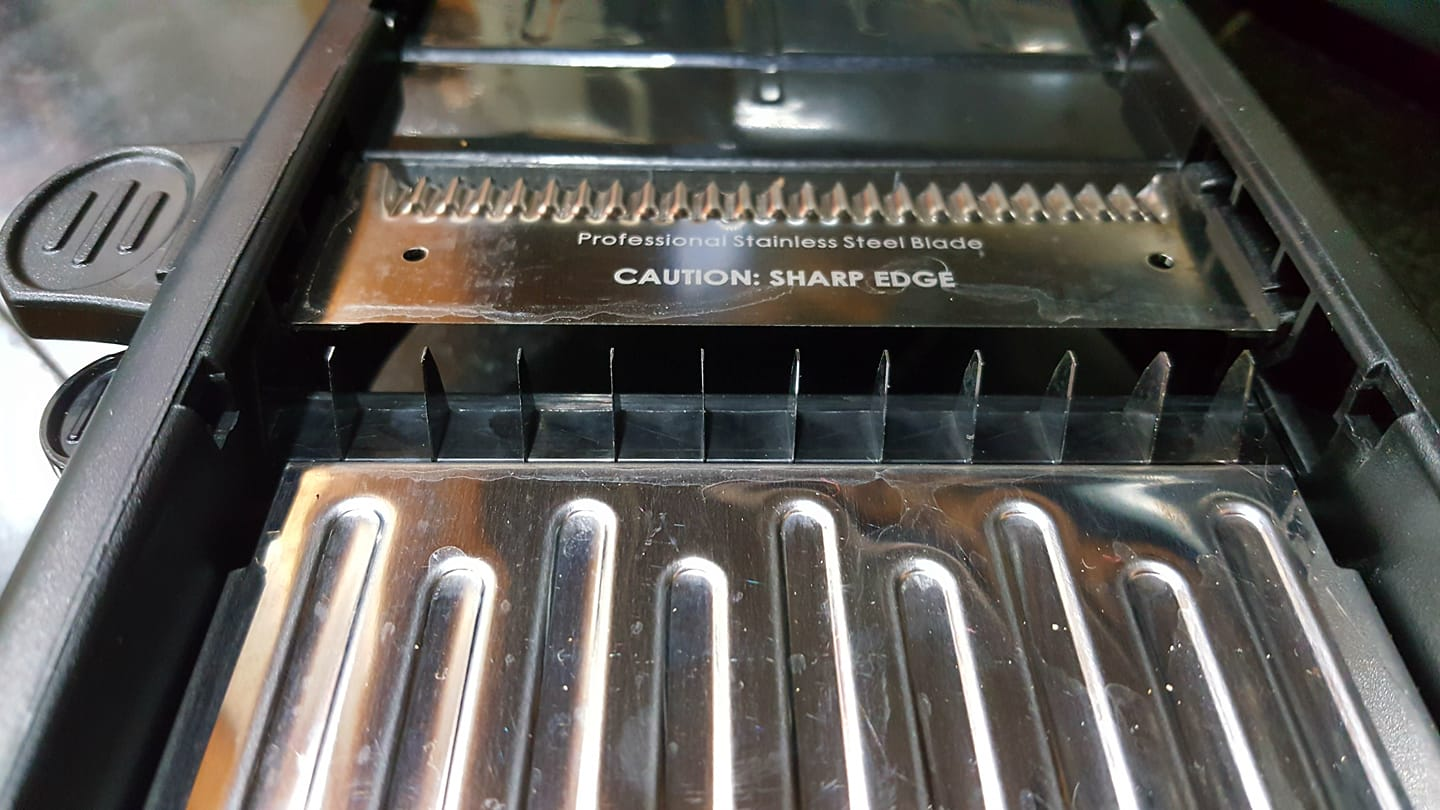
Close up of the cutting apparatus, set up for a 1/4-inch (6 mm) julienne cut

A mandoline consists of two parallel working surfaces, one of which may be adjustable in height. A food item is slid along the adjustable surface until it reaches a blade mounted on the fixed surface, slicing it and letting it fall.

Other blades perpendicular to the main blade are often mounted so that the slice is cut into strips. These mandolines julienne in one or more widths and thicknesses. They also make slices, waffle cuts and crinkle cuts, and dice firm vegetables and fruits.

With a mandoline, slices are uniform in thickness, which is important with foods that are deep-fried or baked, as well as for presentation. Slices can be made very quickly, with significantly less skill and effort than would be required if cutting with a knife or other blade, and adjustable mandolines can make very thin slices.

== Operation ==
A mandoline is used by running a piece of food (with some protection for fingers) along an adjustable inclined plane into one or more blades. On some models vertical blades cut to produce julienne, or a wavy blade is used that produces crinkle cuts. In these models a quarter turn to the food between passes produces dice and waffle cuts.

A mandoline can cause serious injury if not used correctly.

== Sales ==
Sales dramatically spiked in 2024 due to Logan Moffitt's reels utilizing a mandoline.

== See also ==
- Cheese slicer - cuts cheese into thin slices.
- Food processor – chops food using motorisation in multiple ways.
- Grater – produces smaller pieces rather than thin sheets.
- Kezuriki – Japanese version, used to shave katsuobushi, dried blocks of skipjack tuna.
- Meat slicer – a tool used to slice meats and other deli products.
- Microplane – used for the grating of various food items.
- Microtome – the laboratory-grade equivalent, for much finer slicing thicknesses.
- Oroshigane – graters used in Japanese cooking.
