= Egg slicer =

Kitchen utensil

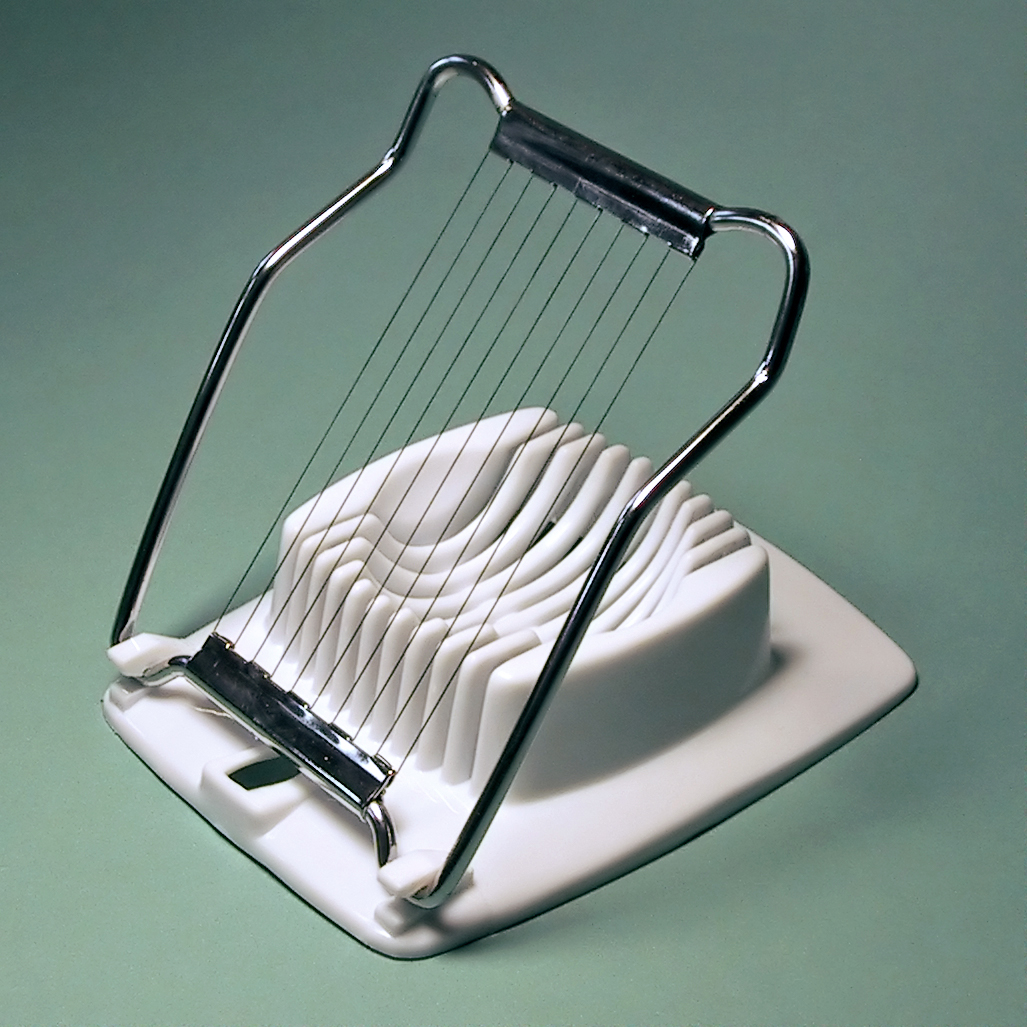
An egg slicer

Use of an egg slicer

An egg slicer is a food preparation utensil used to slice peeled, hard-boiled eggs quickly and evenly. An egg slicer consists of a slotted dish for holding the egg and a hinged plate of wires or blades that can be closed to slice.

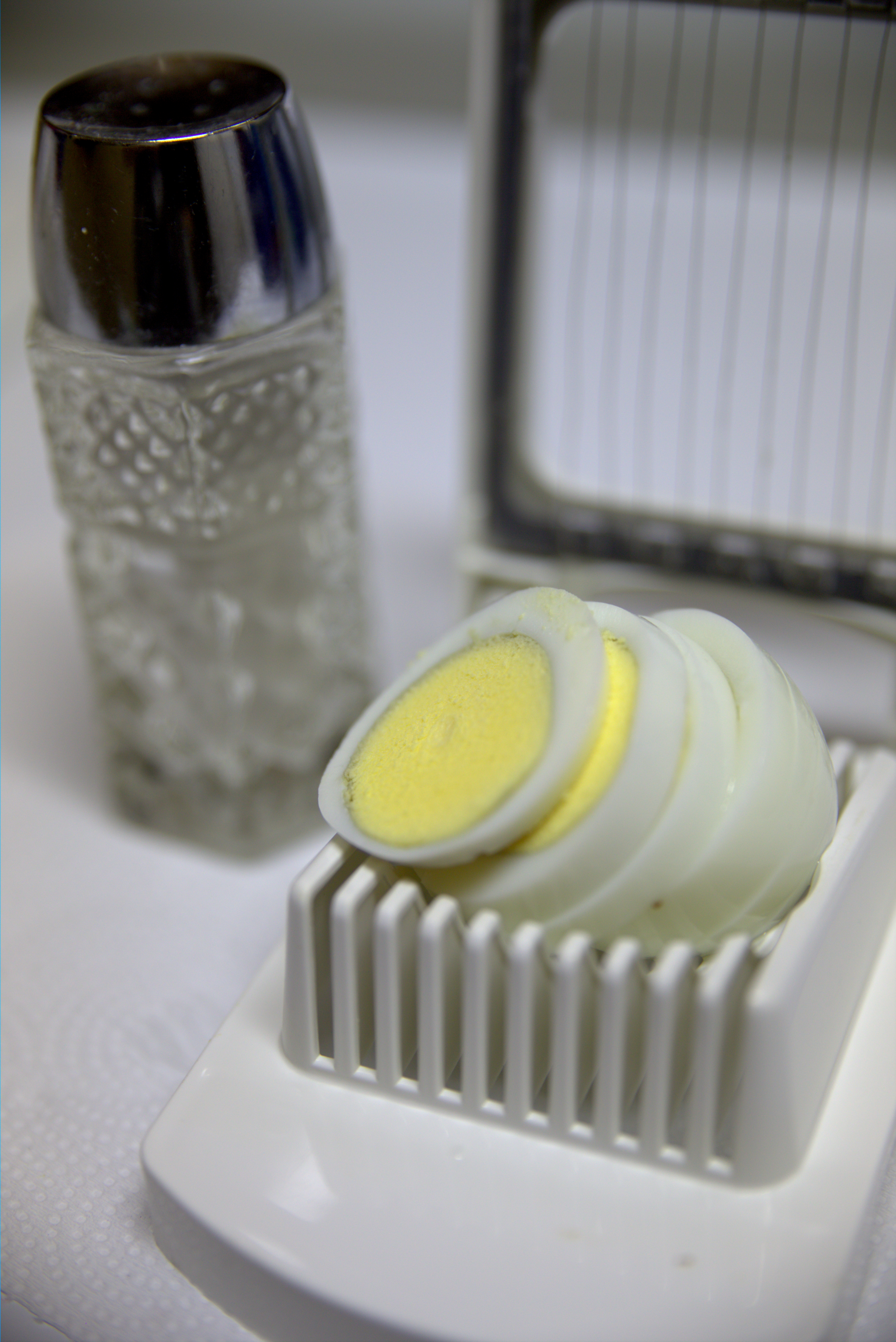
Sliced egg

The wire egg slicer was invented and patented by Willy Abel, a German inventor (1875–1951), in 1912, who also invented the bread cutter. The first egg slicers were produced in Berlin-Lichtenberg.

Dutch comedic duo Van Kooten en De Bie created a mock documentary about a Dutch egg slicer factory in 1983.

Aside from egg slicer, there is also egg wedger. Egg wedger uses criss-cross wires instead of parallel wires for slicing.

== As a musical instrument ==
Some egg slicers that have thin wires can be played as string instruments. A recorded example is English experimental music group Coil's 'The Gimp (Sometimes)', where primary group member John Balance played an egg slicer solo, dubbing it a 'mini-harp', on both the studio version and later live performances.

== See also ==
- Mandoline
