= Katsuobushi =

Dried, fermented, and smoked skipjack tuna

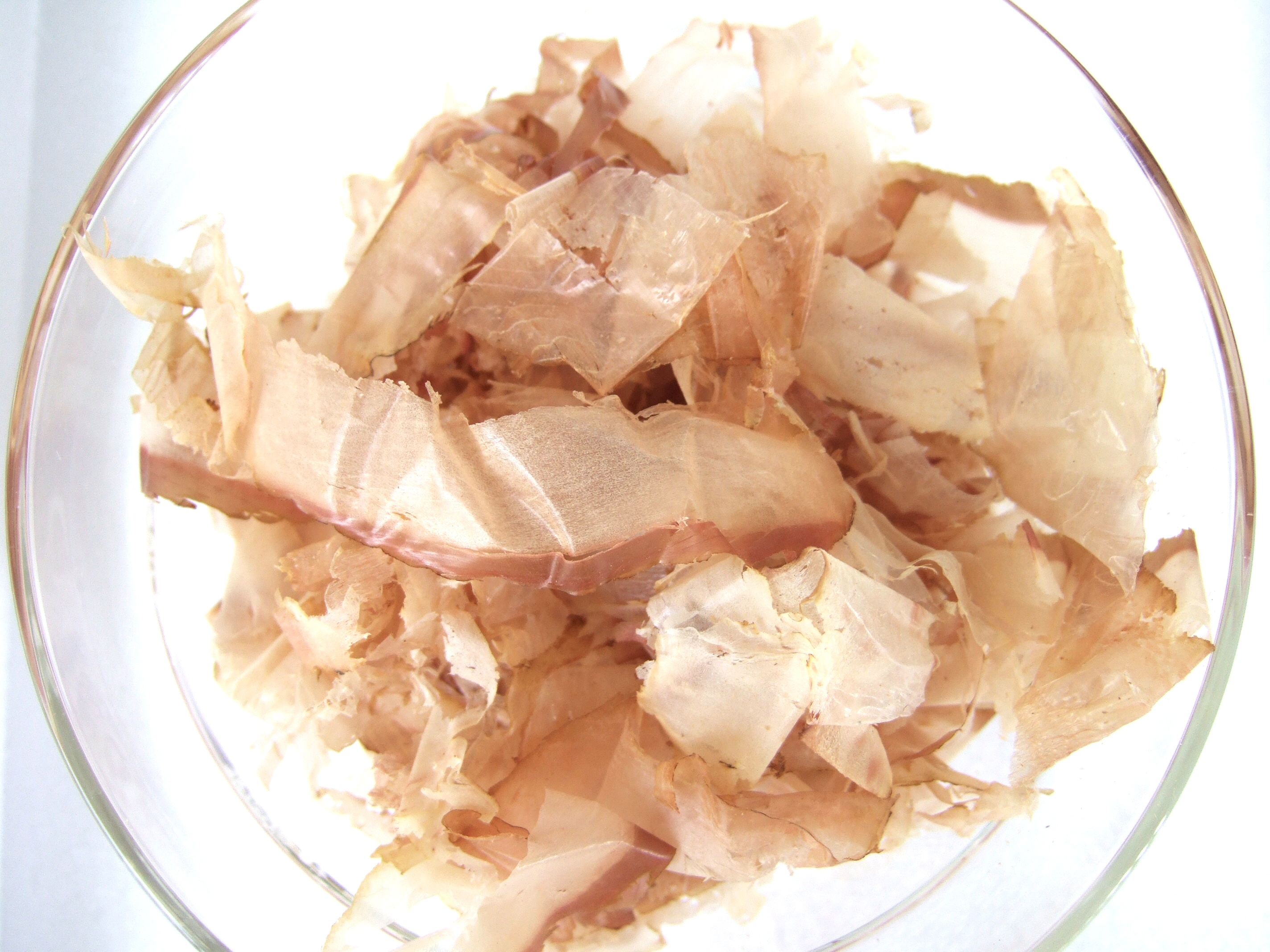
- Katsuobushi shavings from a package

Steam animates katsuobushi

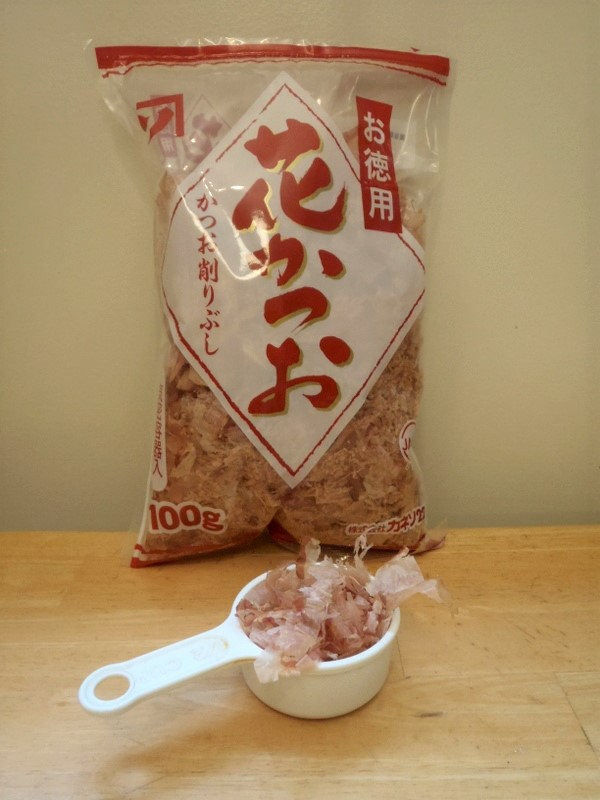
A bag of hanakatsuo flakes

Katsuobushi (Japanese: 鰹節) is simmered, smoked and fermented skipjack tuna (Katsuwonus pelamis, sometimes referred to as bonito). It is also known as bonito flakes or broadly as okaka (おかか).

Shaved katsuobushi and dried kelp—kombu—are the main ingredients of dashi, a broth that forms the basis of many soups (such as miso) and sauces (such as soba no tsukejiru) in Japanese cuisine.

Katsuobushi's distinct umami taste comes from its high inosinic acid content. Traditionally made katsuobushi, known as karebushi, is deliberately fermented with Aspergillus glaucus fungus in order to reduce moisture. Katsuobushi has also been shown to impart kokumi (a term translated as "heartiness").

== Traditional production process ==
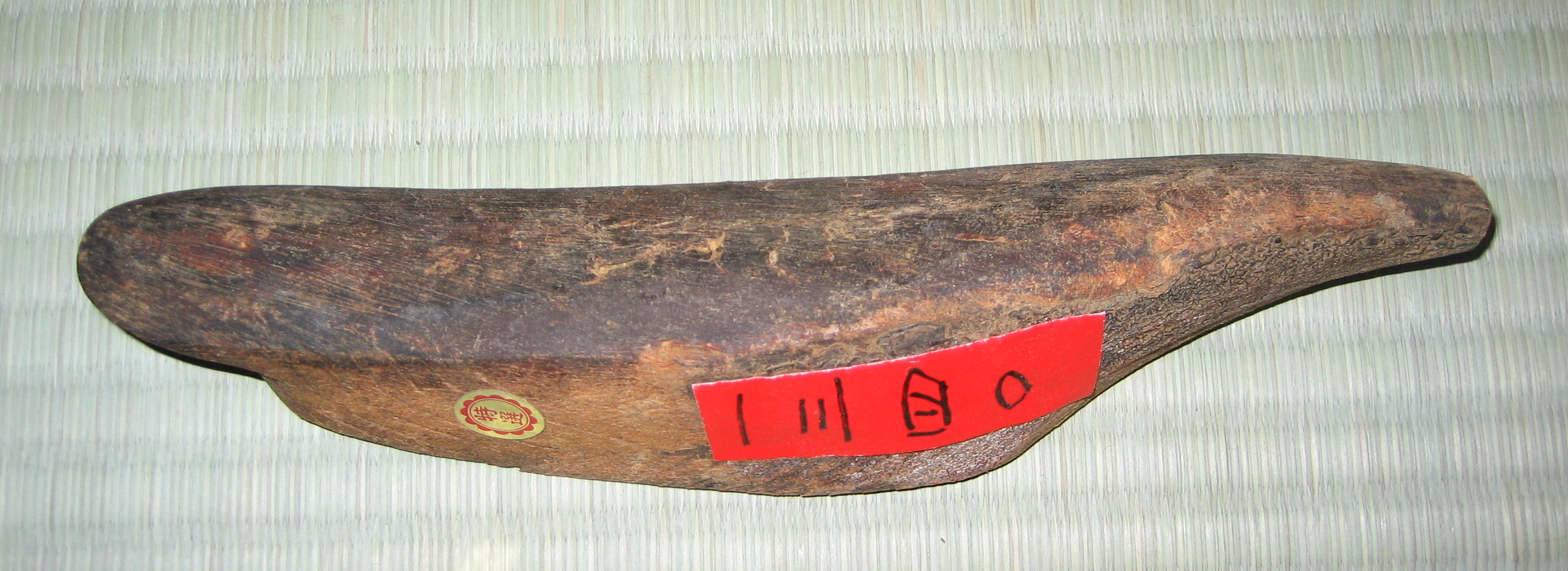
Katsuobushi is in wood-like blocks.

The fish is beheaded, gutted, and filleted, with the fatty belly, which does not lend well to being preserved, trimmed off. The fillets are then arranged in a basket and simmered just below boiling for an hour to an hour and a half, depending on their size.

The rib bones are then removed and the fillets smoked for up to a month using oak, pasania, or castanopsis wood. They are smoked for five to six hours in one session, left to rest one day for the condensation to rise to the surface, then fired and smoked again the next day. This smoking and resting cycle is repeated 12–15 times in total. At this point, the fish is dry and hard, and the built-up tar from the smoke and excess fat is cleaned from the surface using a grinder. At this stage the fillets are called arabushi (荒節) and most commonly found in stores shaved and packaged for sale under the name katsuo-kezuri-bushi (鰹削り節) or hanakatsuo. They are not true katsuobushi without the last fermentation stage, but still valued as a good substitute.

The last stage of creating katsuobushi is to allow the fish to sun-dry using the assistance of mold. The fillets are sprayed with Aspergillus glaucus culture and left for two weeks in a closed cultivation room. The mold ferments the fillets and also draws out any residual moisture.

The mold is continually scraped off, with further sun-drying increasing hardness and dryness until the fillet resembles a piece of wood, with less than 20% of its original weight. By definition, only fillets that have been treated in this manner may be referred to as katsuobushi. After repeating this process of mold growth and sun-drying at least twice, the katsuobushi can also be called karebushi (枯節; lit. 'dried fillet'), and fillets repeating this process more than three times can be called honkarebushi (本枯節; lit. 'true dried fillet'). When tapped together lightly, they sound almost metallic, and unlike their dull beige outer appearance, when broken open they are a translucent deep ruby color inside. Rarely, very high-end honkarebushi repeat this drying process for over two years.

In the Edo era, it was common for katsuobushi to go through an extra step, the so-called tebiyama style (手火山式, tebiyama-shiki) process. After the fillets are boiled and their rib bones removed the fish are put in steaming baskets stacked atop one another for one to two hours a few meters above a burning wood fire. These are rotated to assure an equal exposure to the smoke. The result is more flavorful and resistant to deterioration. Due to the extra cost and facilities required only a few factories following tebiyama-shiki remain.

== Shaving ==
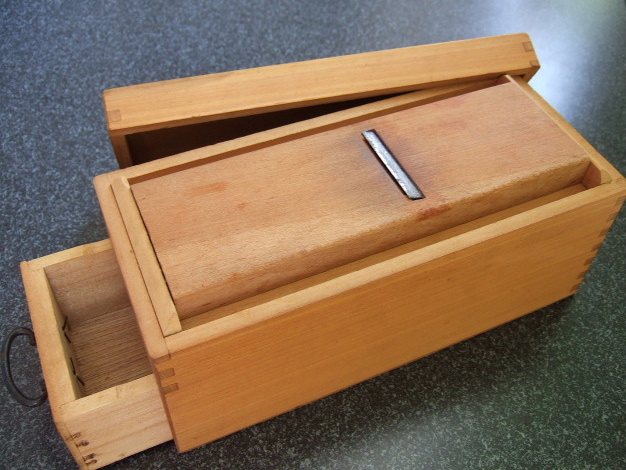
Katsuobushi kezuriki used to prepare katsuobushi shavings

Traditionally, chunks of katsuobushi were shaved as needed with an instrument similar to a wood plane called a katsuobushi kezuriki.

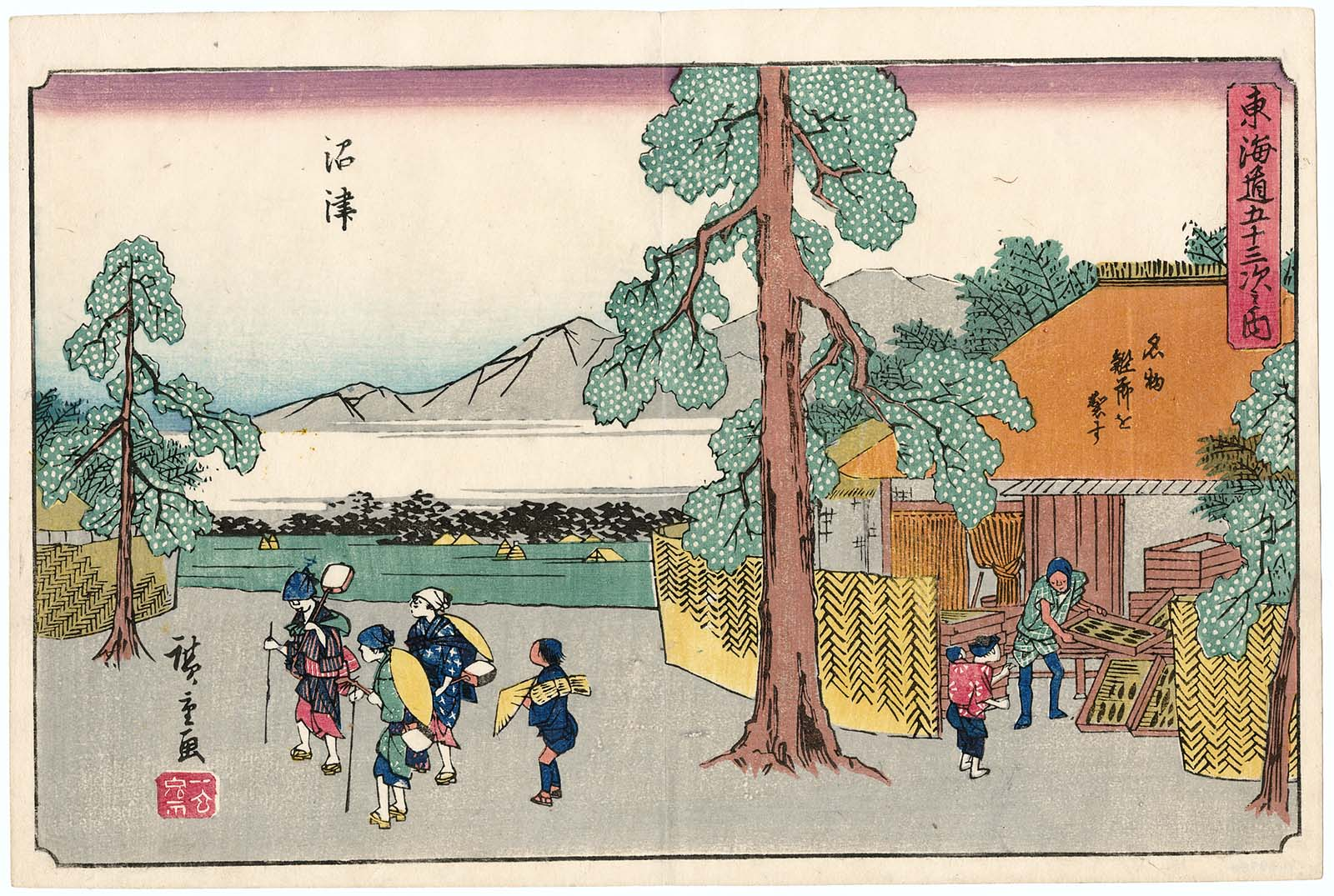
Hiroshige

Today katsuobushi is typically sold in bags of small pink-brown shavings, which vary by thickness: smaller, thinner shavings, called hanakatsuo (花鰹), are used as a flavoring and topping for many Japanese dishes, such as okonomiyaki, while the larger thicker, called kezurikatsuo (削り鰹), are favored for making the widely used dashi stock.

== Uses ==
In addition to making dashi, other popular uses of katsuobushi include:

- Okaka, finely chopped katsuobushi dressed with soy sauce.
  - As a stuffing for rice balls (onigiri).
  - As a topping for rice. Popular for bentō, often covered with strips of laver.
  - Dried okaka is used as an ingredient of furikake rice topping (called "okaka furikake").
- As a seasoning for cold tofu (hiyayakko, 冷奴) along with grated ginger and Welsh onion (a type of spring onion).
- Sprinkled with sesame seeds and chopped laver atop cold soba noodles (zarusoba).
- As a topping on takoyaki, okonomiyaki or agedashi dōfu.
- As a seasoning on century egg along with sesame oil and soy sauce.
- As a high-protein treat for cats sold at pet stores.
- As a topping for ramen mixed with salt.

== Health ==
The mycotoxin beta-nitropropionic acid has been found on katsuobushi as well as in miso and in soy sauce, two other Japanese fungal fermented products. Certain strains of A. glaucus are reported to produce mycotoxins.

Due to the smoking process which involves tar and charcoal, amounts of benzopyrene exceeding EU standards, as much as 37μg per kilogram, have been detected in commercially sold katsuobushi. As a result, they have been banned for sale in the European Union.

== See also ==
- List of dried foods
- Maldives fish
