= Cold noodles =

Asian noodle dishes

Cold noodles are dishes typically made out of noodles, soy sauce, cucumber, and various other ingredients. They are commonly served at room temperature with a dipping sauce on the side. The methods and ingredients used to make cold noodles vary from country to country.

== Examples ==
=== China ===
==== Sichuan cold noodles ====
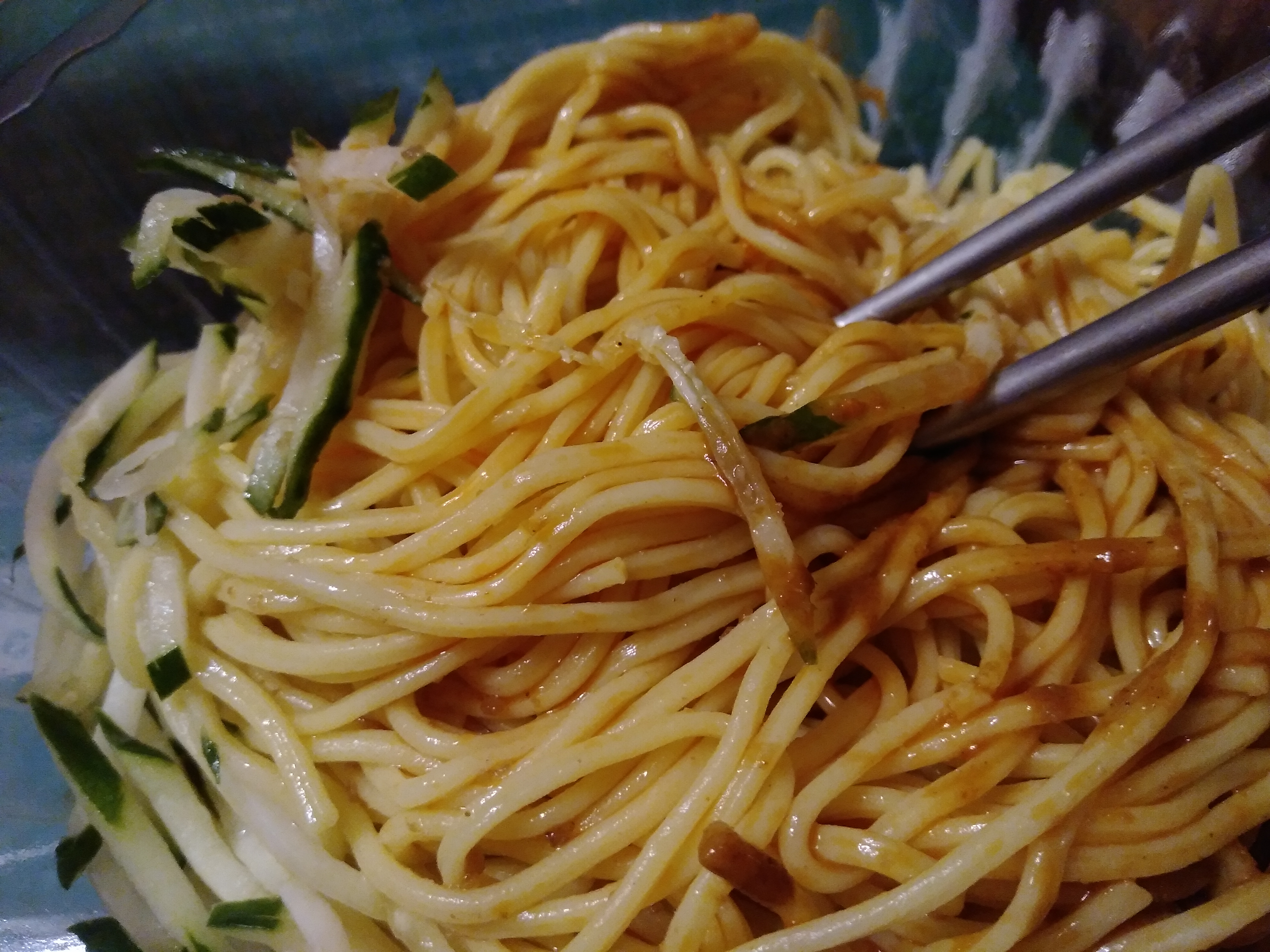
Sichuan cold noodles

Sichuan cold noodles is a dish originating in Sichuan, China. The dish is unique in that baking soda is added to the noodles. The dish also includes Sichuan seasonings like paprika and chili oil.

==== Guangyuan cold noodles ====
Guangyuan cold noodles, originating in Sichuan, China, are made from rice instead of flour. Unlike other dishes, Guangyuan noodles can be served hot or cold.

==== Shanghai cold noodles ====
Shanghai cold noodles, originating in Shanghai, China, consist of Shanghai-style noodles that are steamed, and then cooked to make them chewier. Peanut butter and other seasonings are added to this dish, giving the noodles more flavor.

=== Taiwan ===
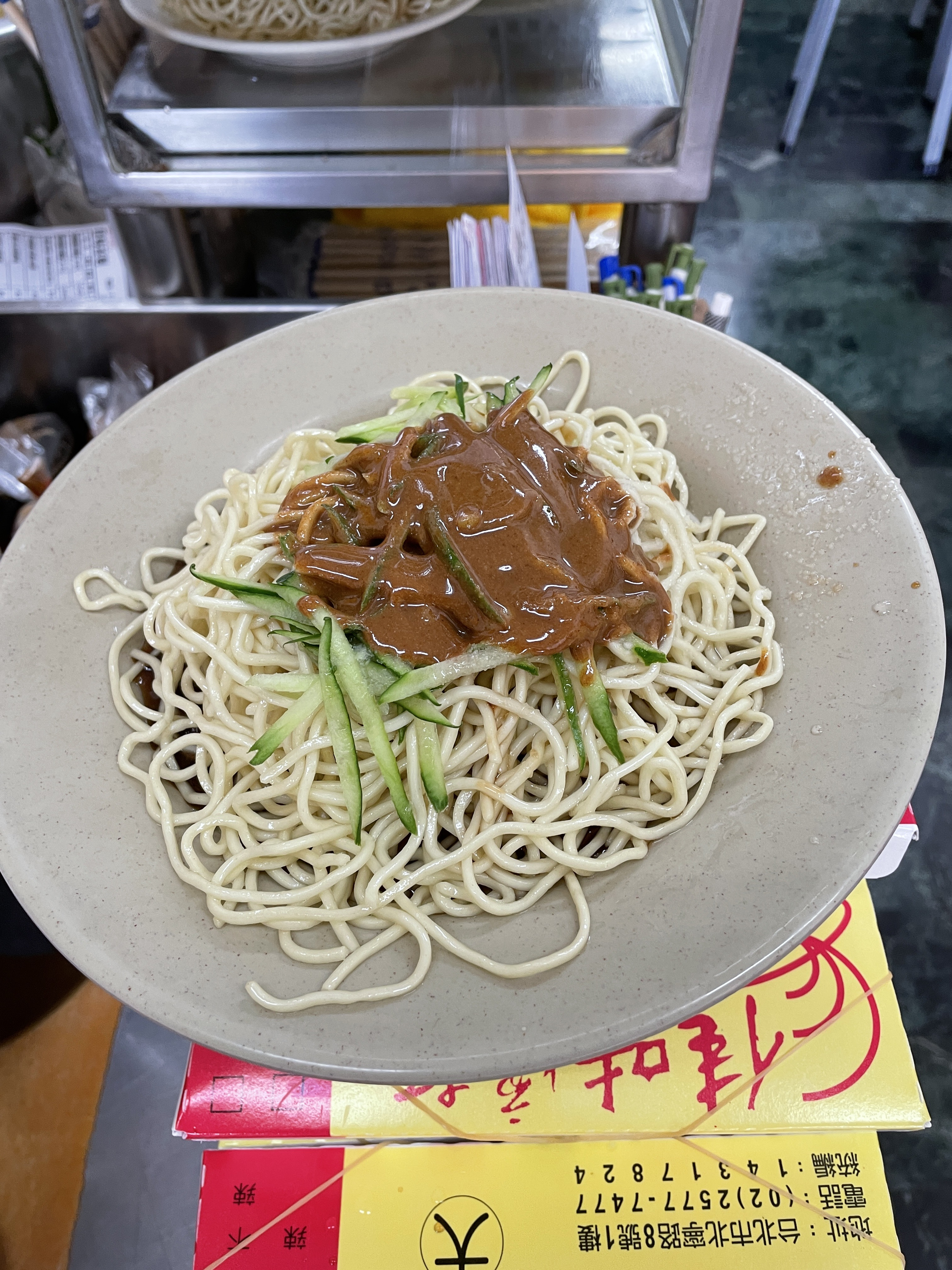
Taiwanese cold noodles

Taiwanese cold noodles are typically made using cooked Yi noodles (意麵) or oil noodles (油麵), which are cooled with an electric fan and then mixed with salad oil to maintain their chewy texture and prevent sticking. Common toppings and condiments include sesame paste or peanut sauce, soy sauce, vinegar, proprietary herbal sauces, sugar water, minced garlic, and julienned cucumber. For those who enjoy spicier flavors, chili oil, chili powder, and other spicy condiments may be added. Crushed peanuts are also used by some vendors to enhance both texture and aroma.

In Chiayi, a city in southern Taiwan, a regional variation features wide, flat noodles and a unique combination of sauces. In addition to the traditional sesame paste, mayonnaise—locally referred to as "white vinegar" —is commonly added. The dish is often served with various chilled vegetables, such as julienned cucumber, shredded purple cabbage, corn, and carrots.

=== Korea ===
==== Naengmyeon ====
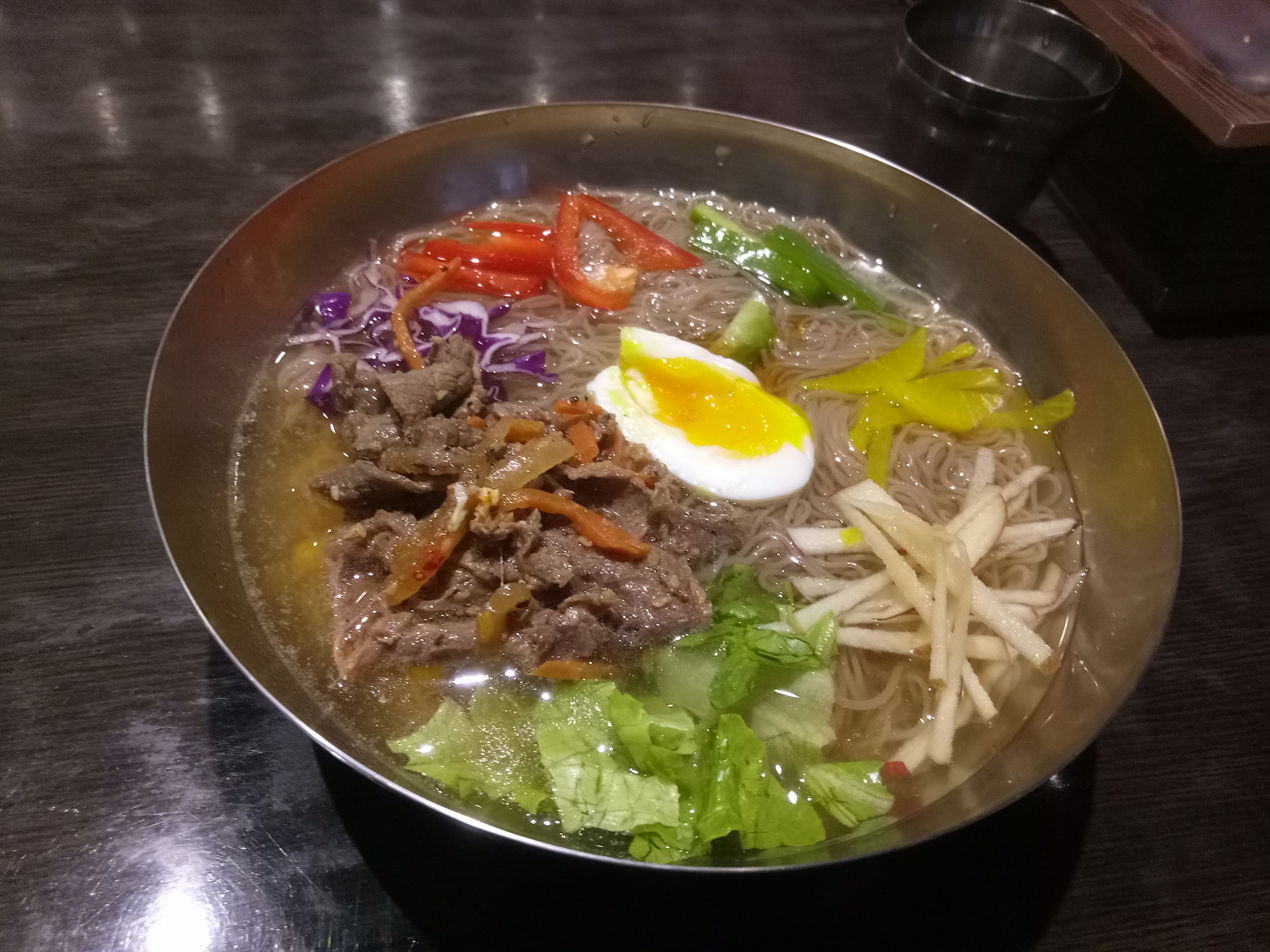
Naengmyeon

Naengmyeon is a cold noodle dish that is usually served in stainless steel bowls. The choice of flours and toppings for making the noodles varies with personal preference. Usually, naengmyeon is made with buckwheat flour and includes toppings like cucumbers and beef.

==== Jaengban-guksu ====
Jaengban-guksu is a traditional cold noodle salad that is often served as a companion to Korean barbecue. This dish is made out of noodles, different toppings, and a spicy sauce. People alter the types of noodles and toppings of this dish based on their preference.

==== Kong-guksu ====
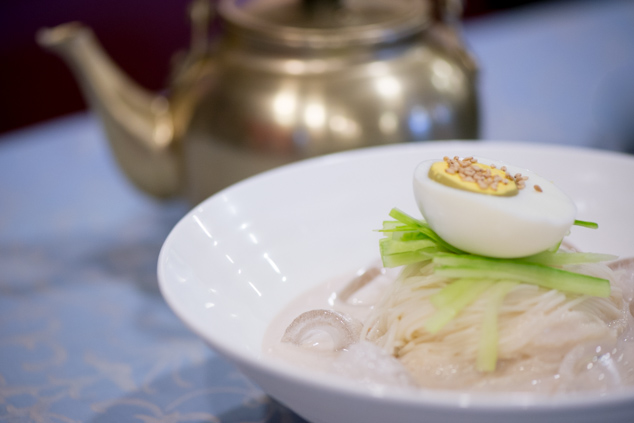
Kong-guksu

Kong-guksu is a seasonal dish that is traditionally served in summer. The noodles are served in a cold broth made of soy milk; ice is sometimes added.

==== Bibim-guksu ====
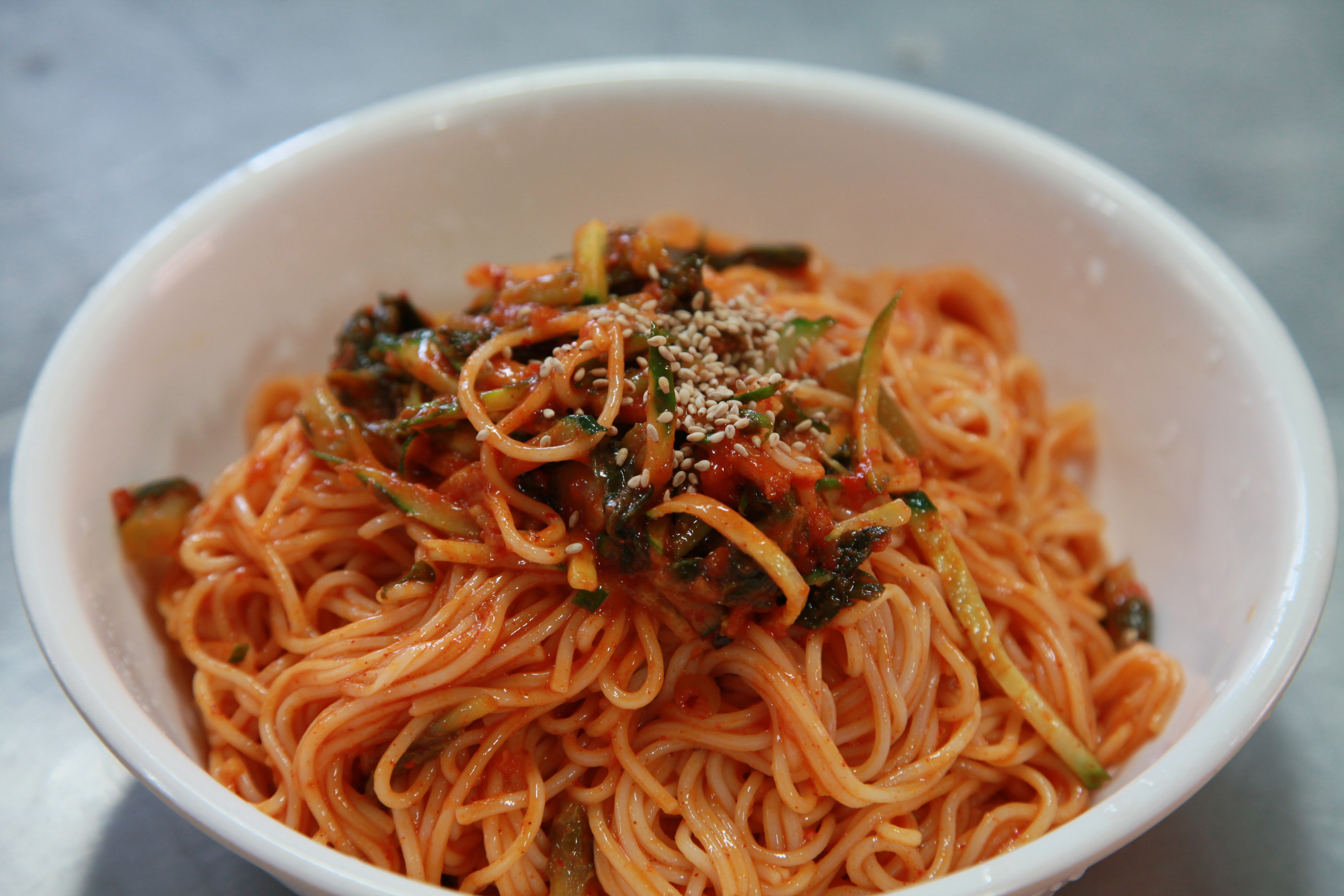
Bibim-guksu

Bibim-guksu is a dish similar to the kong-guksu in that it is traditionally served in the summer and consists of noodles mixed with a cold sauce and various toppings. The choice of ingredients varies widely based on personal preference. "Sour and spicy sauce" is the signature component.

=== Japan ===
==== Soba noodles ====
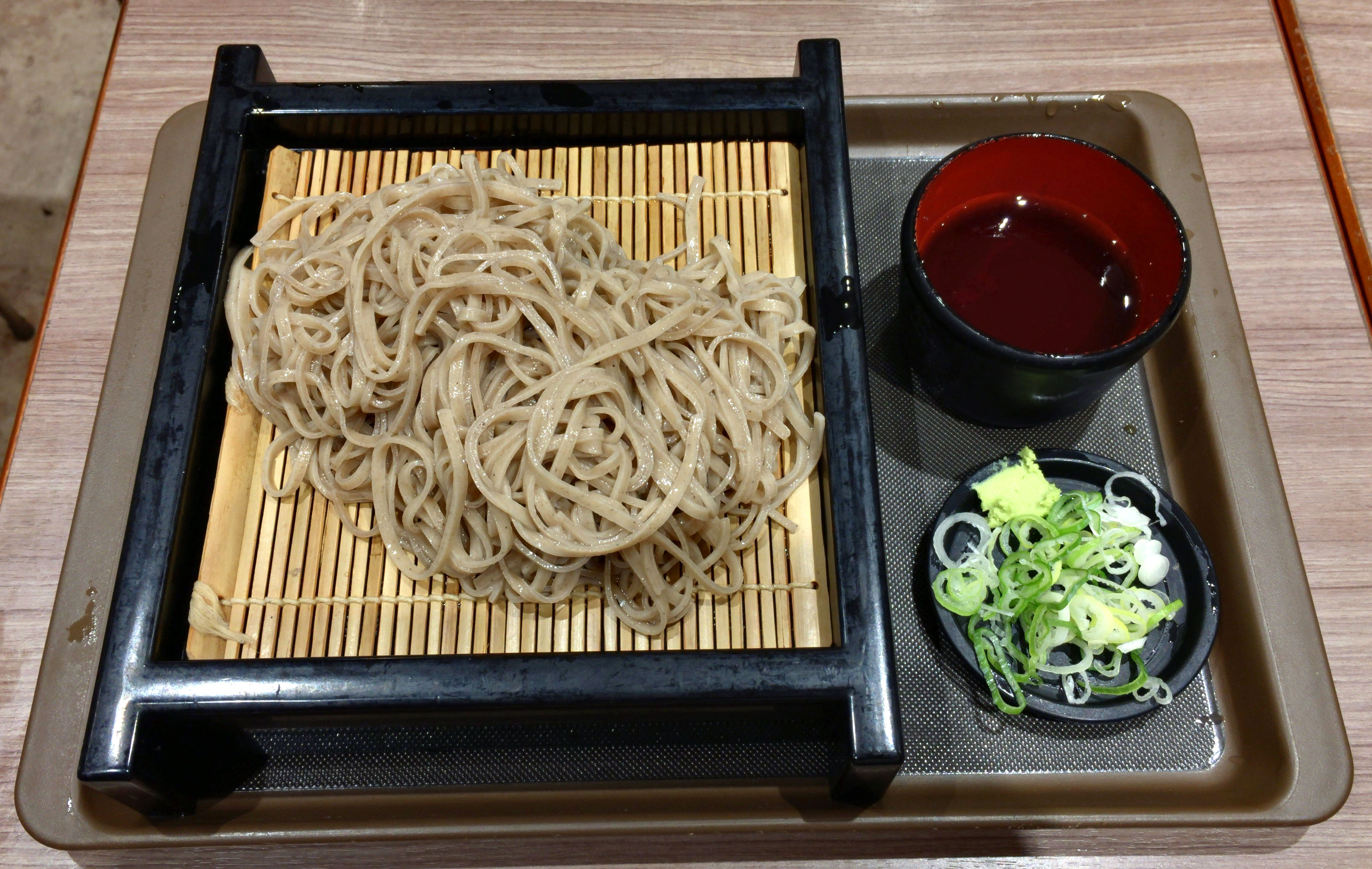
Mori soba

Soba is a traditional Japanese dish that can be served either cold or hot. Cold soba noodles are served with dipping sauce on the side, while hot versions of soba noodles are served with a soup base. Well-known soba cold noodles include mori soba, zaru soba, tensoba, and tororo soba.

==== Sōmen noodles ====
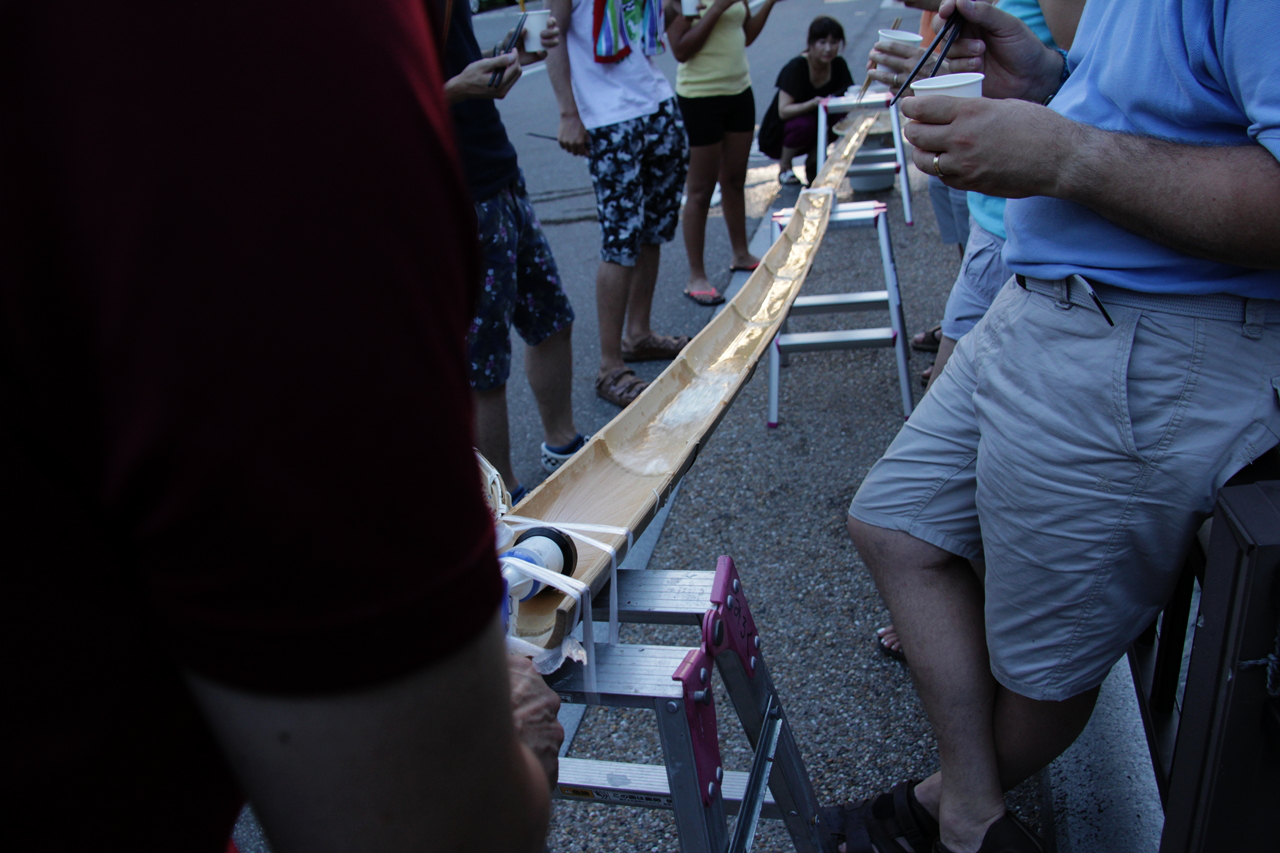
Nagashi sōmen

Sōmen are long, thin noodles that are associated with Japanese traditional ceremonies. Sōmen are usually served in the form of nagashi sōmen, where sōmen in cold water flows down a bamboo flume.

==== Udon noodles ====
Udon are long, thick noodles that can be served either hot or cold. An example of cold udon is Bukkake udon, which is served with cold thick dashi broth.
