= Kamo nanban =

Japanese noodle dish

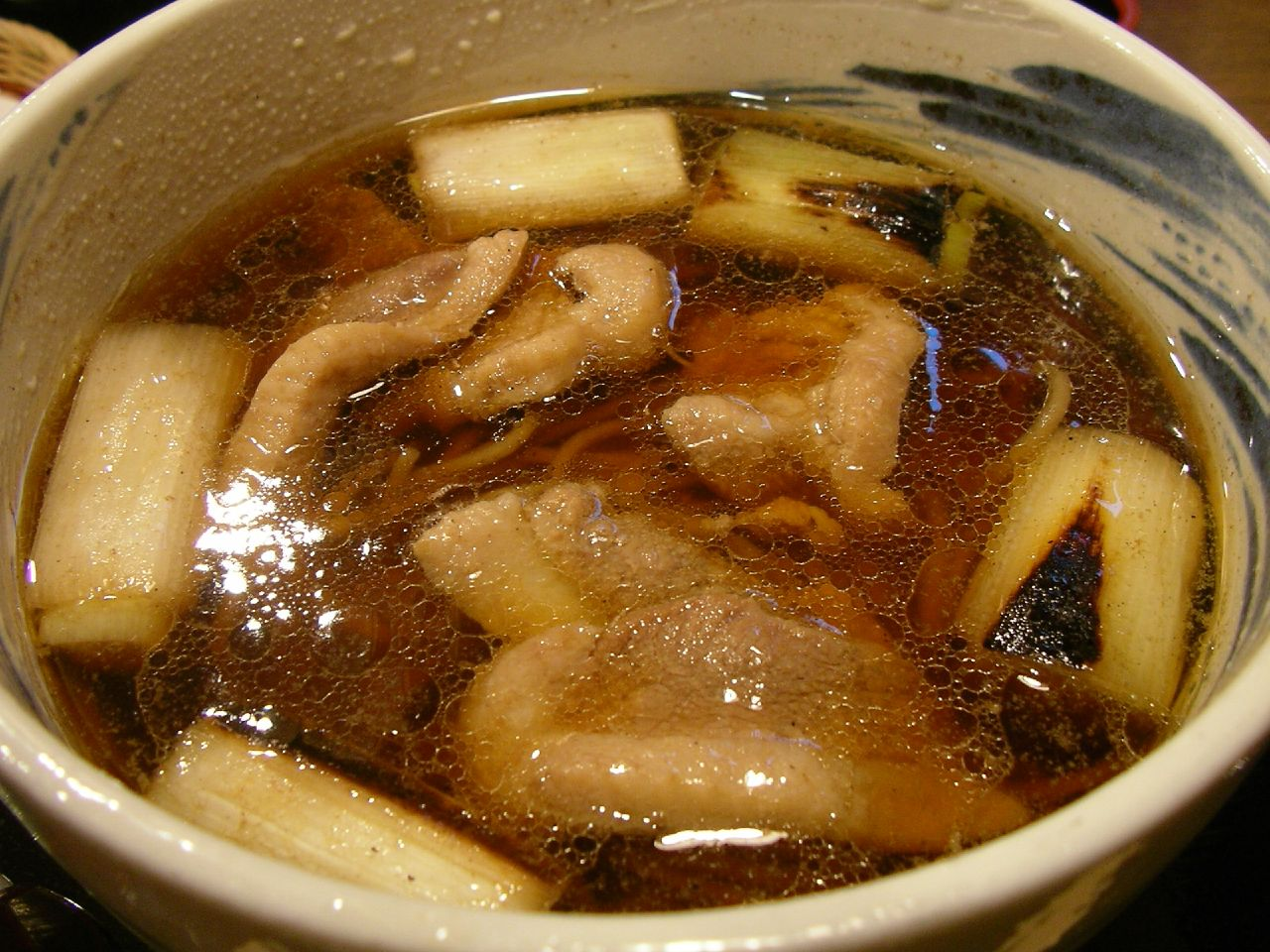
Kamo nanban

Kamo nanban (鴨南蛮) is a Japanese noodle dish made with seasonal soba or udon noodles in a hot dashi soup of duck (鴨) or chicken meat, as well as leeks or Welsh onions. On its own, "nanban soba" (南蛮蕎麦) or simply "nanban" might be used, referring to the onions in the dish.

When chicken meat is used instead, it is then called tori nanban (鳥南蛮) or kashiwa nanban (かしわ南蛮).

== Overview ==
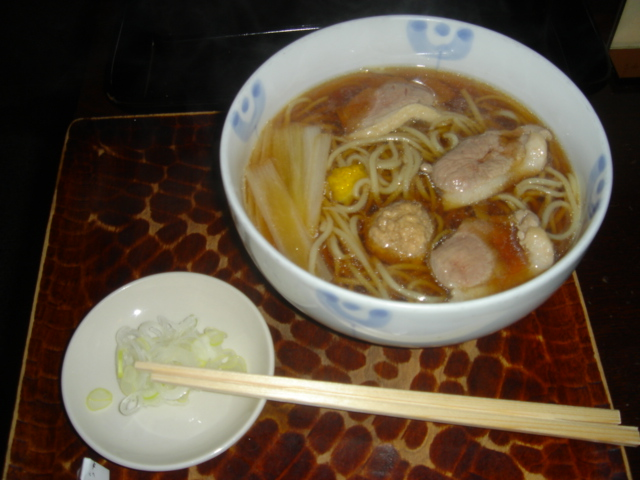
Kamo nanban soba

Kamo nanban is a type of "kake soba" (かけそば) and is normally found on the menu of soba restaurants. It is more expensive compared to other soba dishes like tempura soba and tempura seiro soba.

It has been reported that fatty duck meat is most delicious in the winter season. It is also served with seasonal soba, which is particularly suited to colder days.

== Etymology ==
The use of duck and scallions is the origin of the name. It is said that scallions were named after the Nanman, who arrived in Japan during the Edo period and enjoyed eating them to maintain their health. The bulb onion used widely in European cuisine was difficult to come by in Japan until the Meiji period, and so scallions were used instead.

From another perspective, it may have been called nanban due to being a new dish. In the essay Kiyūshōran (嬉遊笑覧), literary and cultural scholar Kitamura Nobuyo (喜多村信節) states that "Things of custom unusual to the past tend to be called 'nanban'".

In the Kinki region, kamo nanban is called kamo nanba (鴨なんば), where "nanba" is a shifted-sound version of "nanban". Also, in Osaka, Welsh onions have been called "nanba" since the Edo period, with Nanba (難波) having been a famous producer of Welsh onions, but the actual connection is unknown.

At restaurants which offer both soba and udon, kamo nanban soba (鴨南蛮そば) may be written to differentiate from kamo nanban udon (鴨南蛮うどん), an udon dish with the same flavourings.

== History ==
Bukkake soba (ぶっかけそば), eaten with a hot soup based on soy sauce and flaked bonito, became widespread in the middle of the Edo period. The addition of duck and Welsh onions in the manner of kamo nanban is considered to have been started by the Sasaya (笹屋) restaurant in the Shibakuro-chō area of Nihonbashi. Kamo nanban using about five one-inch pieces of Welsh onion, cut vertically and fried, then boiled with duck, is said to have met the tastes of the time and thrived.

Also in Morisadamankō (守貞謾稿), a work with detail of the Mores of the closing days of the Tokugawa shogunate, Kamo nanban is introduced as "Duck with onions. A specialty of winter."

The consumption of domestic ducks in Japan came about at the end of the Meiji era, before which kamo nanban solely used wild ducks.

== Ingredients ==
Domestic ducks and wild ducks are used. Because natural wild ducks are difficult to come by, most soba restaurants use cultivated birds. The juicier thigh meat and soft breast meat are used.

In the Taishō period, there were instances of rabbit meat being used. In "I am a cat", there is the expression "the ingredient of kamo nanban is like as chicken; the lodge's beef hotpot is like as horse meat" (鴨南蛮の材料が烏である如く、下宿屋の牛鍋が馬肉である如く).

For onions, long Welsh onions which suit duck are used. In some instances, they are only warmed briefly in soup before being added, but frying or roasting in sesame oil is considered to be correct. Cutting into 5 cm round slices is common.

For seasoning, chilli pepper or yuzu are used.

== Instant noodles ==
In 2003, the 'Acecook' Company released the first kamo nanban instant "cup noodle" as one of their large-portion "super cup" instant noodles.

In 2009, Nissin Foods' released a duck stock soba version of their "don hyōei" product.

In the 9th episode of the TV drama series "Kurosagi", the kamo nanban cup noodle eaten by the main character was an original version of the show.

== Related dishes ==
=== Kamo nuki ===
Kamo nanban "without duck". It is enjoyed as a snack dish with alcohol. The duck meat's fragrance adds a characteristic flavour; alcohol is recommended to match the smell and flavor of broiled duck, umami of the dashi, and the high-grade fat of the duck.

=== Kamo seiro ===
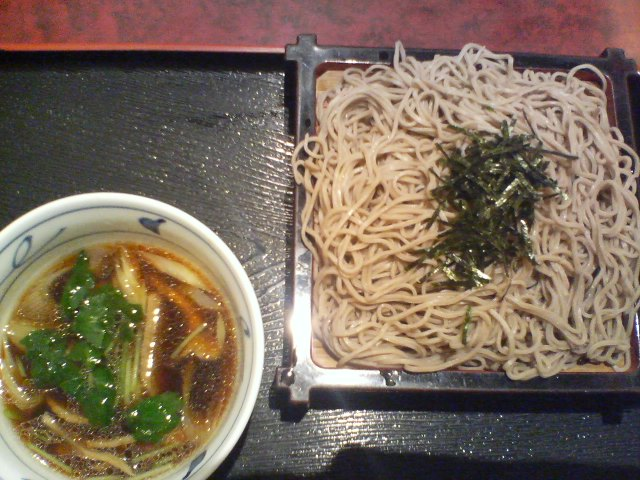
Kamo seiro

Cold, cooked soba eaten with a dipping sauce of duck meat and Welsh onions. It is said to have been conceived in 1963 at the Ginza Chōji-an (長寿庵) restaurant

=== Kamo nanban udon ===
Warm udon with duck and Welsh onions.

=== Tori nanban ===
Similar soba dish using chicken instead of duck. Also called kashiwa udon. "Chicken nanban" is an entirely different non-noodle dish with chicken cutlets and onions.
