= Tensoba =

Japanese noodle dish

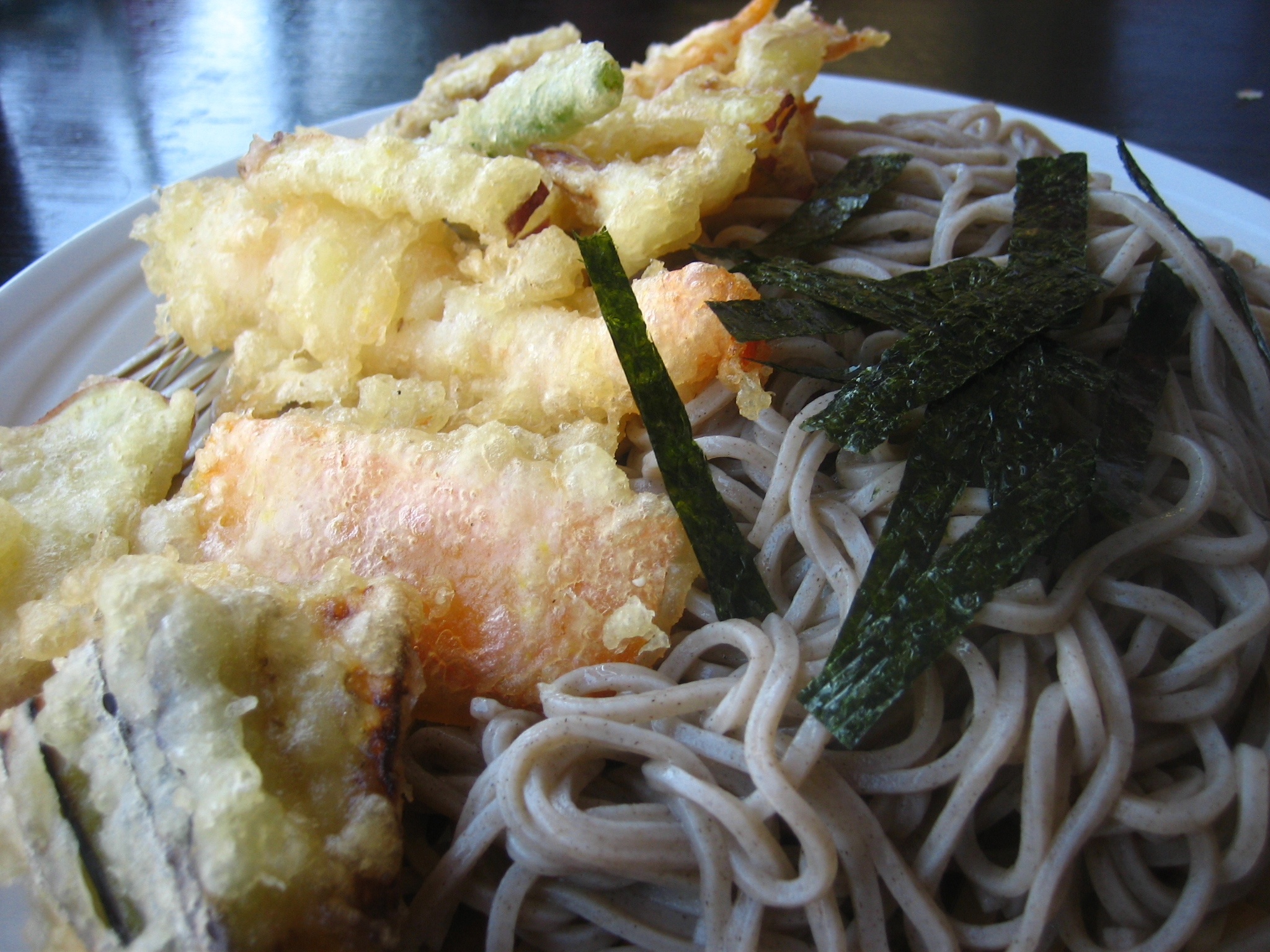
- Type: Japanese noodles
- Place of origin: Japan
- Main ingredients: Noodles (soba), tempura

Tensoba, or tempura soba, is a Japanese dish of soba noodles and tempura.

== Overview ==
There are two varieties of tensoba: one is served with a hot broth of dashi and soy sauce; the other is served with cooled soba and dipped in tsukejiru (lit. 'dipping sauce'), either chilled or hot and usually strongly flavored. The dipping variety is also called tenzaru-soba or ten-seiro, depending on the soba shop or stand.

Like tendon, tensoba uses many kinds of vegetable or seafood tempura, or kakiage (lit. 'scratch tempura', using a mixture of vegetable or seafood bits).

== History ==
Tensoba originated during the mid-Edo period. It was first eaten as a hot broth soba with kakiage, using the adductor muscles of surf clams. At that time, shrimp tempura-soba was more expensive than other ingredients. So, shrimp tempura-soba is also called jo-tempura-soba (lit. 'upper-class tempura-soba') or ebiten-soba.

== Regional variety ==
There are some regional varieties for tensoba toppings. In Kanto and Kyushu, the soba shops often use satsuma age (fried fish cake) or chikuwa for tempura. These two fish cakes are sometimes batter-fried.
