= Soba =

Thin Japanese noodle made from buckwheat flour

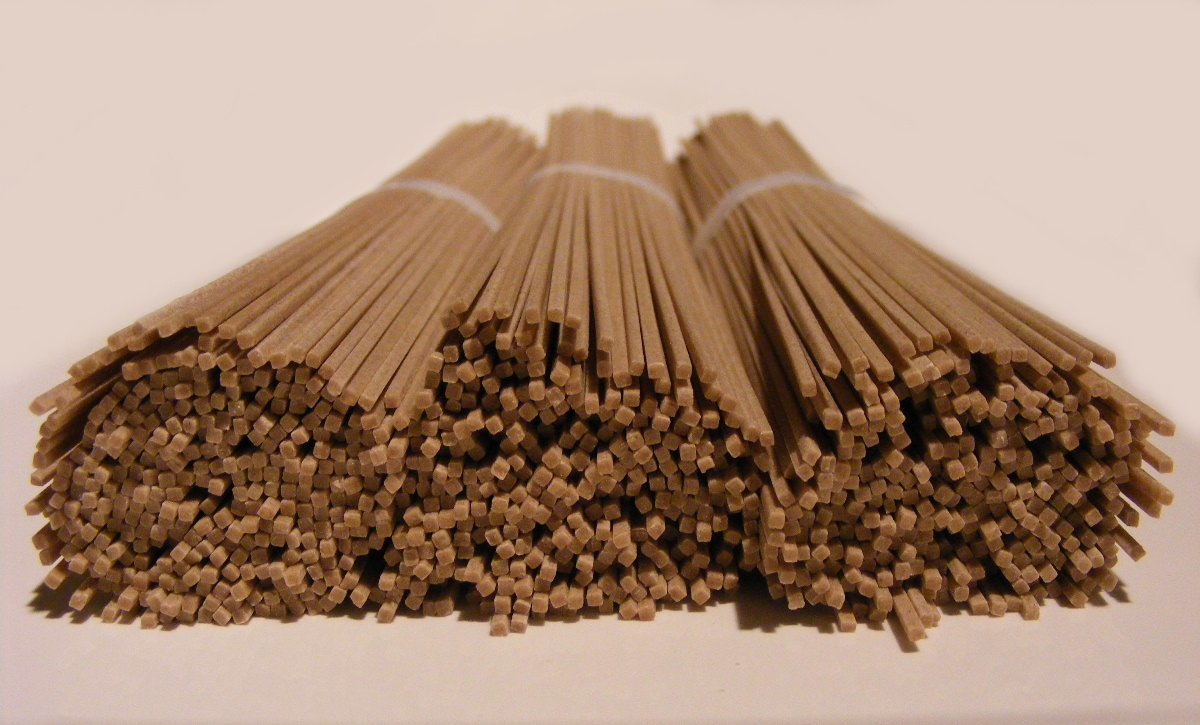
- Dried soba
- Type: Noodles
- Place of origin: Japan
- Serving temperature: Hot, cold
- Main ingredients: Buckwheat
- Other information: Puta (Bhutan)

Soba (そば or 蕎麦, "buckwheat") are Japanese noodles made from buckwheat flour, with varying amounts of wheat flour mixed in. It has an ashen brown color, and a slightly grainy texture. The noodles are served either chilled with a dipping sauce, or hot in a noodle soup. They are used in a wide variety of dishes.

In Japan, soba noodles can be found at fast food venues like standing-up-eating (立ち食いそば, tachigui-soba) to expensive specialty restaurants. Dried soba noodles are sold in stores, along with men-tsuyu, or instant noodle broth, to make home preparation easy.

The amino acid balance of the protein in buckwheat, and therefore in soba, is well matched to the needs of humans and can complement the amino acid deficiencies of other staples such as rice and wheat (see protein combining). The tradition of eating soba among ordinary people arose in the Edo period.

== Etymology ==
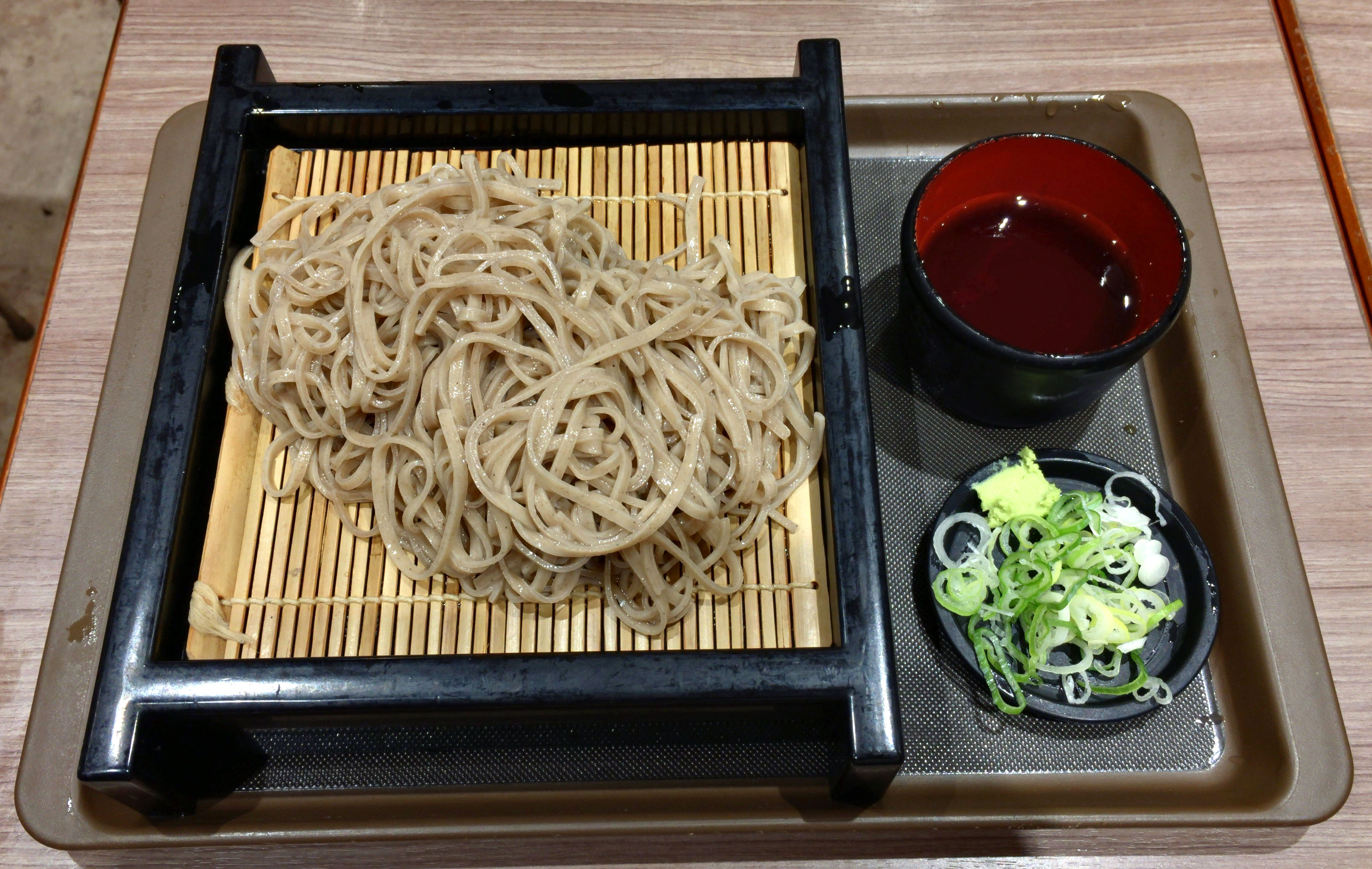
Mori soba, served cold with dipping sauce and negi

The word soba (蕎麦) means "buckwheat" (Fagopyrum esculentum). The full name for buckwheat noodles is soba-kiri (蕎麦切り, 'buckwheat slices'), but soba is commonly used for short.

Historically, soba noodles were called Nihon-soba, Wa-soba, or Yamato-soba, all of which mean "Japanese soba". This was meant to distinguish soba from wheat noodles of Chinese origin, such as ramen, sōmen, or udon.

In more recent times, soba can refer to noodles in general, regardless of origin or composition. For example, ramen was traditionally called chūka soba (中華そば) or shina soba (支那そば), both meaning "Chinese noodles", though the word shina is now considered offensive. Soba can be used to refer to wheat noodles, as in aburasoba or yakisoba. In Okinawa, soba generally refers to Okinawa soba, also made from wheat flour.

== History ==
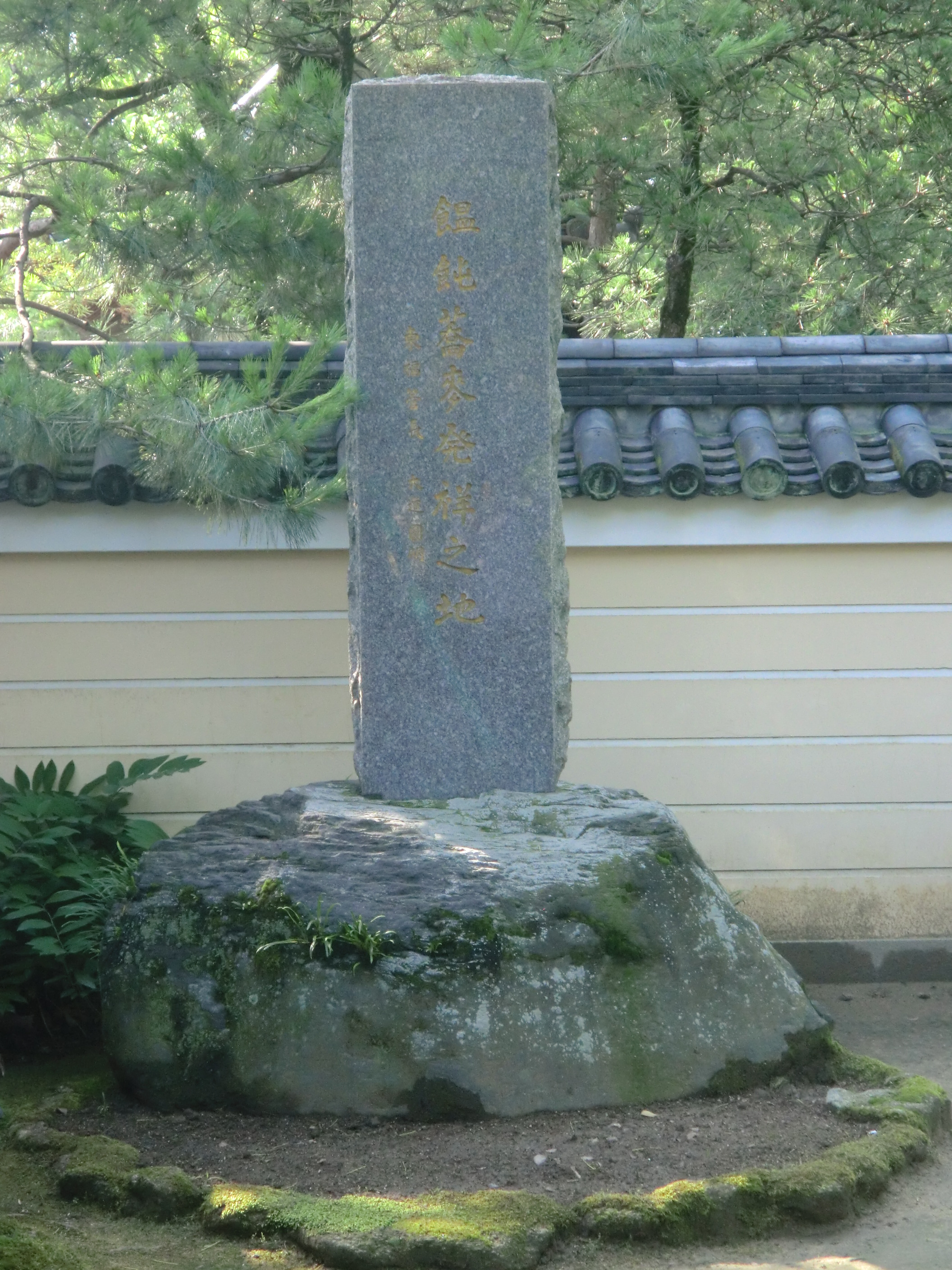
Stele commemorating the introduction of soba and udon noodles at Jōten-ji temple. Enni, the temple's founder, is traditionally believed to have brought noodlemaking back to Japan from China.

=== Background ===
Traces of buckwheat have been found at Neolithic sites in Japan, dating to 4000–2000 BCE, during the Jōmon period.

Buckwheat cultivation was first recorded in the Shoku Nihongi, in an imperial edict of 722 CE issued by Empress Genshō, instructing farmers to plant buckwheat in response to drought and famine. Another edict of 839 CE declared that buckwheat should be sown in August, and harvested in October, because the crop grows quickly in poor soil. However, buckwheat did not seem to be widely cultivated, and was only sporadically eaten as porridge.

In the 8th century, noodle-type foods of Chinese origin appeared in Japan. Later, the monk Enni (1202–1280) is traditionally credited for introducing noodles to Japan after returning from China.

The first specific reference to buckwheat noodles (soba-kiri) comes from a record of 1574, kept at Jōshō-ji temple, which documents that soba-kiri was served to workers repairing the main hall. More mentions of soba noodles follow throughout the early 1600s.

=== Edo period ===
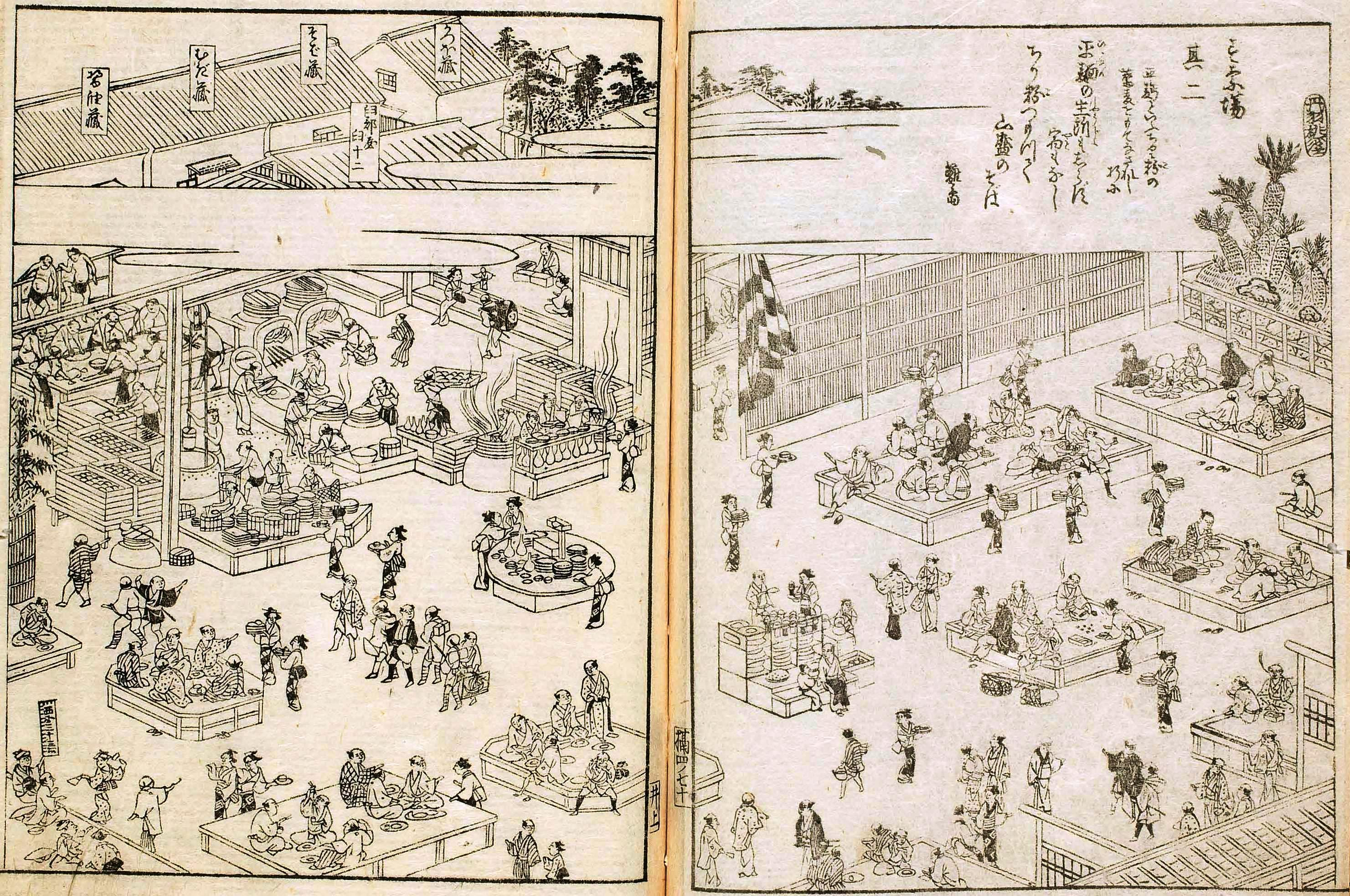
Print depicting Sunaba, a popular soba restaurant from Osaka. By Takehara Shunchōsai, 1796–1798

Modern soba originates from the Edo period (1603–1868), centered around the city of Edo (modern Tokyo). The earliest references to soba are associated with Buddhist monasteries and tea ceremonies.

The 1643 cookbook Ryōri Monogatari (料理物語) is the first to contain a recipe for making soba. After the Great Fire of Meireki in 1657, soba shops became increasingly common in Tokyo.

At first, soba was considered a low-class food, but its reputation improved by the 18th century, when it began to be eaten by samurai and other high status peoples.

One estimate states that every city block had one or more restaurants serving soba. These soba establishments, many also serving sake, functioned much like modern cafes where locals would stop for a casual meal. In 1860, a meeting in Tokyo concerning the price of buckwheat was attended by 3,726 shops, indicating the popularity of soba. Soba was also sold from mobile food stalls called yatai.

At the time, much of the city's population was susceptible to beriberi, due to high consumption of white rice, which is low in thiamine. Soba, which is high in thiamine, was regularly eaten to prevent beriberi.

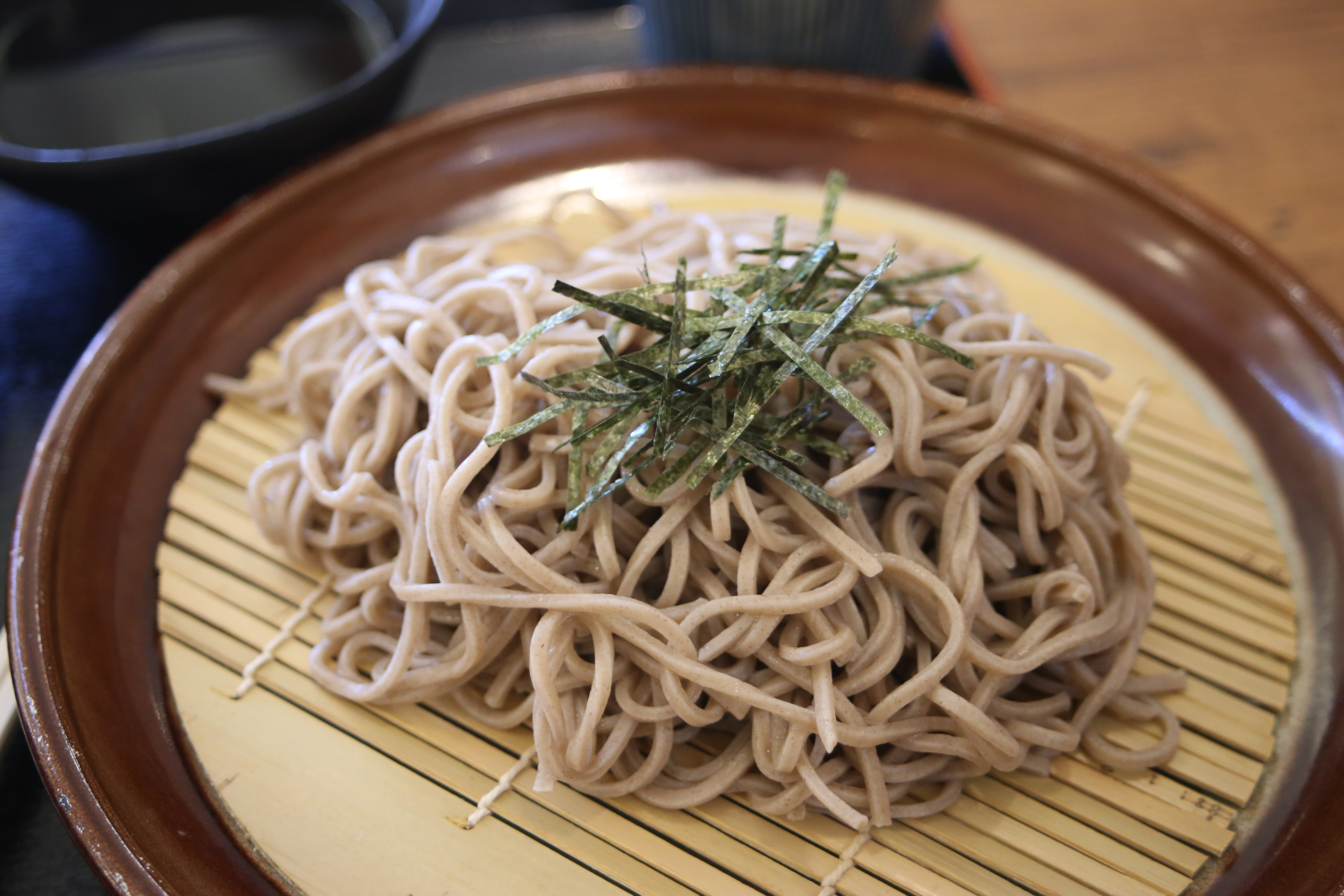
Zaru soba is an early form of soba, because soba was originally steamed on bamboo trays called zaru.

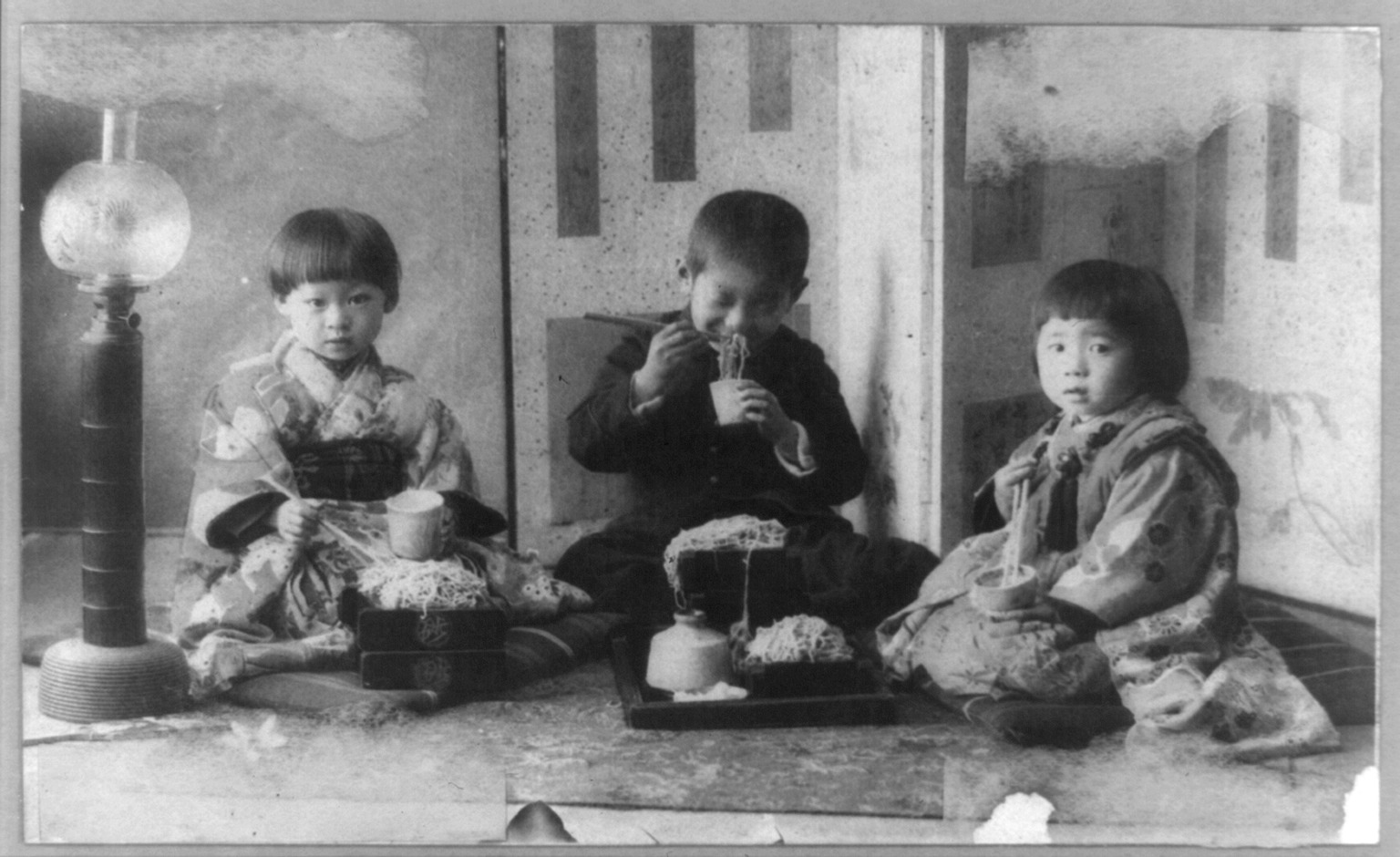
Three children eating soba, 1890–1923

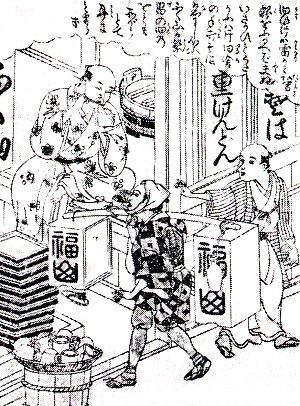
Soba delivery in Fukiya-chō, Tokyo. Print by Kitao Shigemasa, 1771

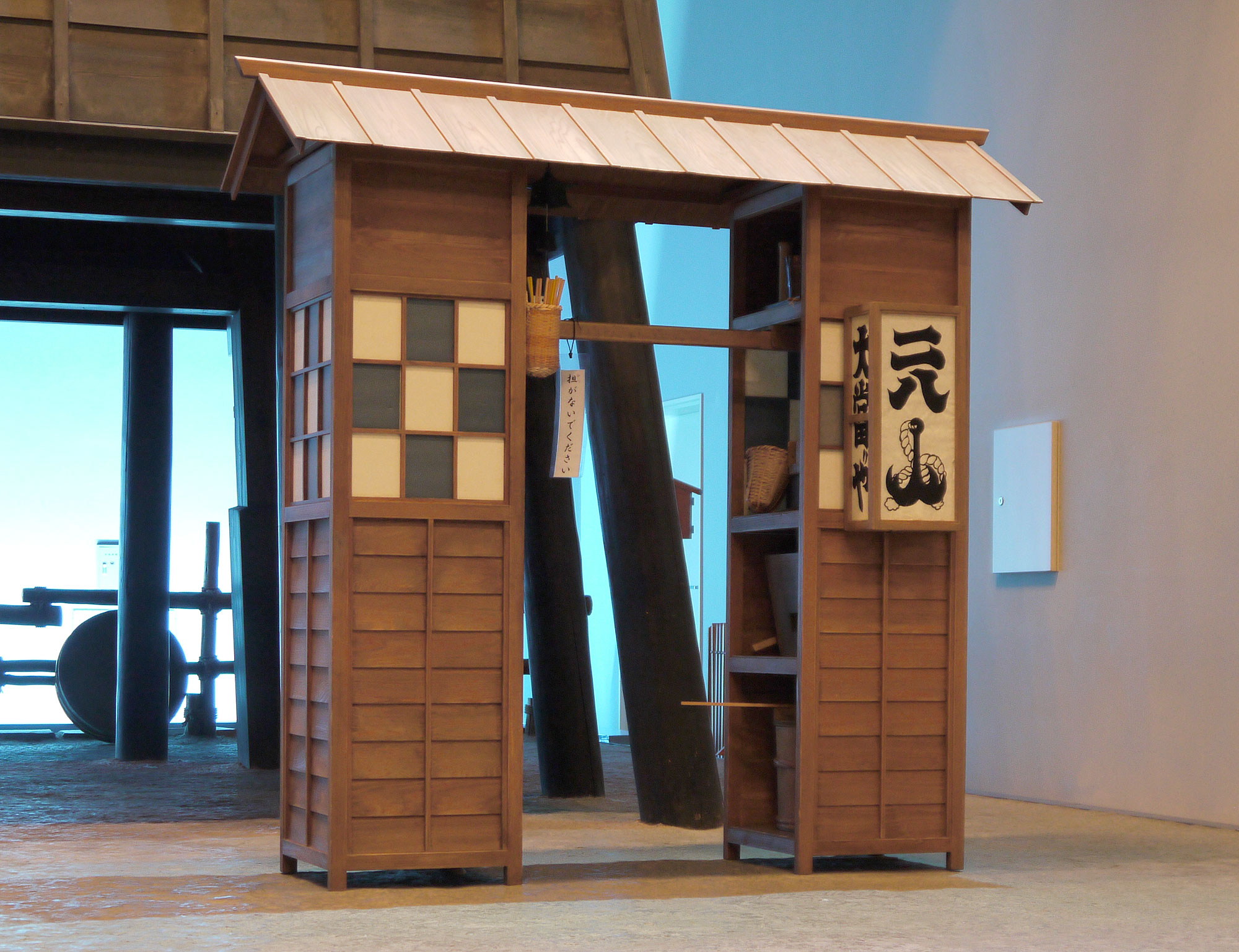
Replica of a yatai (food stall) from the Edo period

=== Modern ===
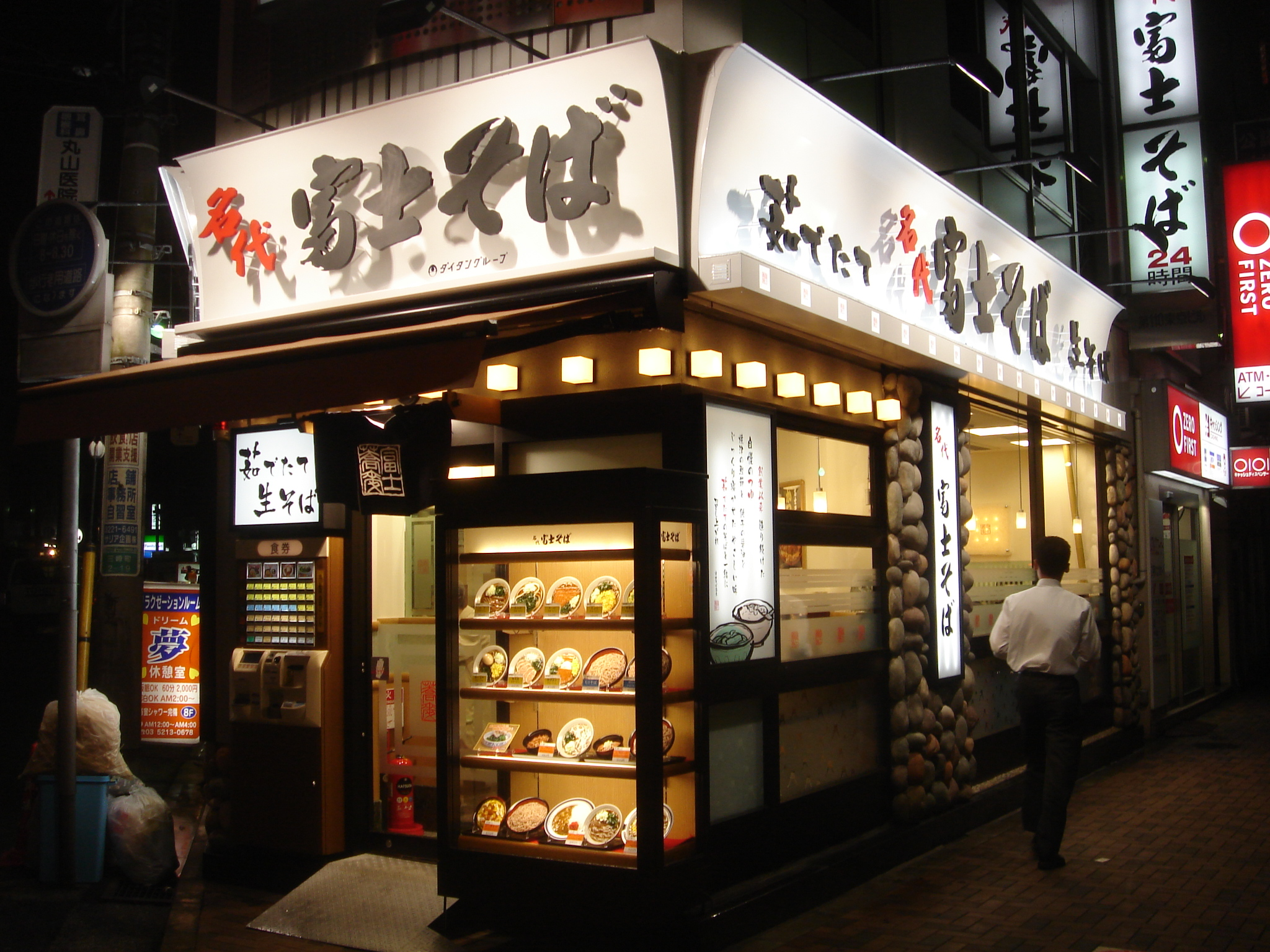
Soba shop near Suidōbashi Station, Tokyo

Soba continues to be popular in modern times. Restaurants dedicated to soba include Sunaba, Chōju-an, Ōmura-an, Shōgetsu-an, Masuda-ya, and Maruka, some of which are yagō, or traditional establishments whose names have passed down over time. Some restaurants serve soba and udon together, since both are prepared and eaten in a similar manner.

Railway stations often sell soba, as it is a popular and inexpensive fast food. They are frequently purchased by busy salarymen. Soba continues to be sold at yatai food stalls.

There are regional differences in the consumption of soba. A common perception is that soba is more popular in the Kantō region (eastern Japan), while udon is more popular in the Kansai region (western Japan), though there are exceptions. As such, soba is considered the traditional noodle of choice for Tokyoites.

Soba is traditionally eaten on New Year's Eve in most areas of Japan. This soba is called toshikoshi soba ("year-crossing soba"). In the Tokyo area, there is also a tradition of giving out soba to new neighbors after a house move (hikkoshi soba), although this practice is now rare.

== Preparation ==
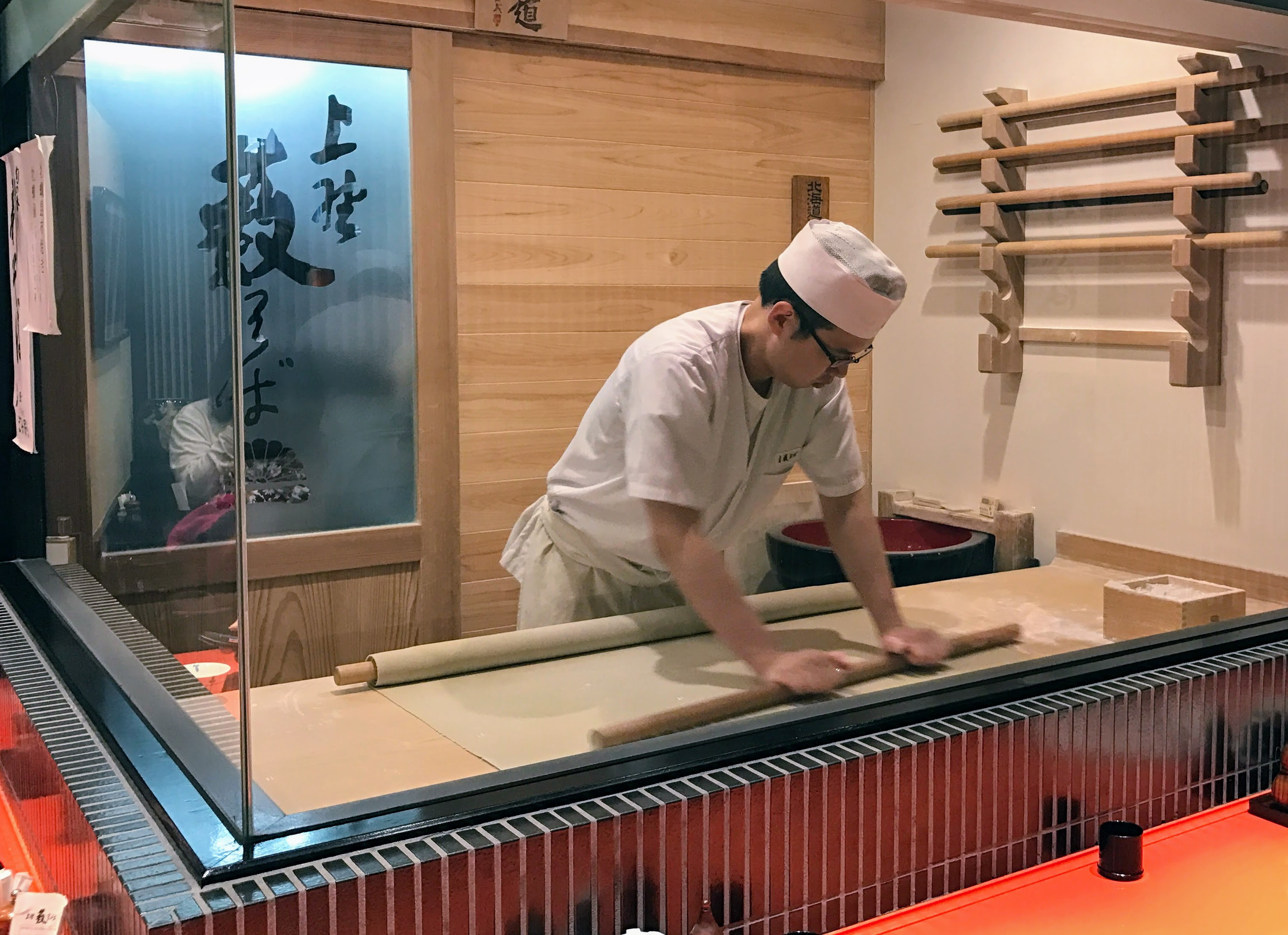
Rolling the dough for soba noodles

Cutting soba noodles and preparing them, 2019

Soba is made by slicing dough into thin noodles. Historically, soba was made only from buckwheat flour, and was steamed in baskets, because they were too brittle to boil. Modern soba is usually made from a mix of 80% buckwheat flour, and 20% wheat flour.

Fresh soba, often served at restaurants, are generally cooked immediately after slicing, when the noodles are still moist and pliable. Store bought soba are dried and straight, and come in bundles.

== Types ==
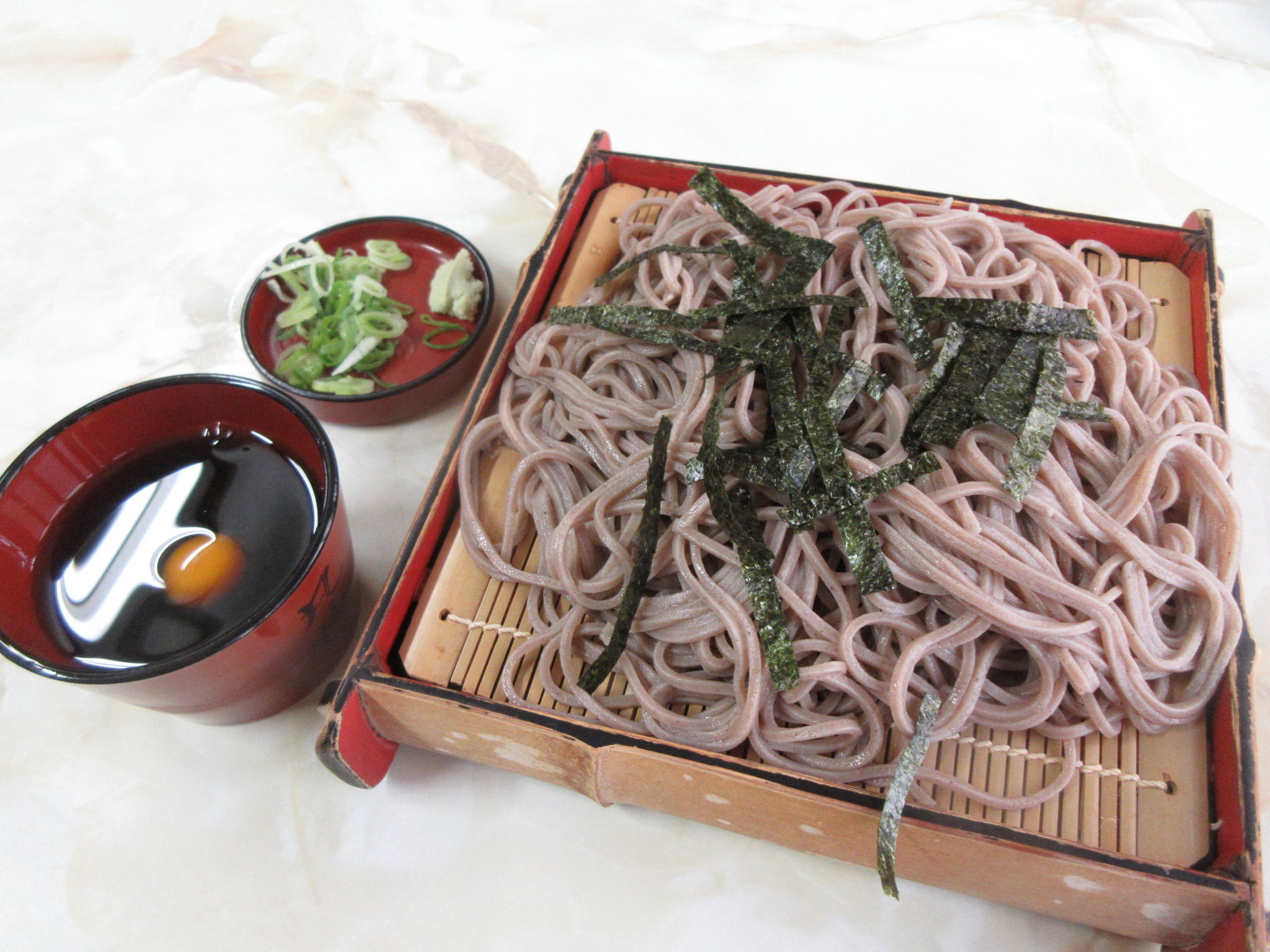
Cold zaru soba topped with nori

Like many Japanese noodles, soba noodles are often served drained and chilled in the summer, and hot in the winter with a soy-based dashi broth. Extra toppings can be added to both hot and cold soba. Toppings are chosen to reflect the seasons and to balance with other ingredients. Most toppings are added without much cooking, although some are deep-fried. Most of these dishes may also be prepared with udon.

=== Cold soba ===
Chilled soba is often served on a sieve-like bamboo tray called a zaru, sometimes garnished with bits of dried nori seaweed, with a dipping sauce known as soba tsuyu on the side. The tsuyu is made of a strong mixture of dashi, sweetened soy sauce (also called satōjōyu) and mirin. Using chopsticks, the diner picks up a small amount of soba from the tray and dips it in the cold tsuyu before eating it. Wasabi and sliced negi are often mixed into the tsuyu. Many people think that the best way to experience the unique texture of hand-made soba noodles is to eat them cold, since letting them soak in hot broth changes their consistency. After the noodles are eaten, many people enjoy drinking the water in which the noodles were cooked (sobayu 蕎麦湯), mixed with the leftover tsuyu.

- Hadaka soba (naked soba 裸蕎麦): Cold soba served on its own.
- Hiyashi soba (冷やし蕎麦): Cold soba served with various toppings sprinkled on top, after which the broth is poured on by the diner. It may include:
  - tororo: puree of yamaimo (a Japanese yam with a mucilaginous texture)
  - oroshi: grated daikon radish
  - nattō: sticky fermented soybeans
  - okura: fresh sliced okra
- Mori soba (盛り蕎麦): Basic chilled soba noodles served on a flat basket or a plate.
- Soba maki: A makizushi prepared as cold soba wrapped in nori.
- Soba salad: Cold soba mixed in the sesame dressing with vegetables. It is a modern and fusion cold soba dish mostly served outside Japan.
- Zaru soba (笊蕎麦): Mori soba topped with shredded nori seaweed.

=== Hot soba ===
Tanuki soba with tenkasu bits

Soba is also often served as a noodle soup in a bowl of hot tsuyu. The hot tsuyu in this instance is thinner than that used as a dipping sauce for chilled soba. Popular garnishes are sliced long onion and shichimi tōgarashi (mixed chili powder).

- Kake soba 掛け蕎麦: Hot soba in broth topped with thinly sliced negi, and perhaps a slice of kamaboko (fish cake).
- Kamo Nanban (鴨南蛮, wild-duck à la nanban (exotic)): Topped with duck meat and negi.
- Kitsune soba (きつね蕎麦, literary "fox (kitsune) soba") (in Kantō) or たぬき蕎麦 Tanuki soba ("raccoon dog soba", in Kansai): Topped with aburaage (deep-fried tofu).
- Karē nanban (カレー南蛮, Curry soba à la nanban (exotic)): Hot soba (or udon) noodles in curry flavored broth topped with chicken/pork and thinly sliced negi.
- Nameko soba なめこ蕎麦: Topped with nameko mushroom.
- Nishin soba 鰊(にしん)蕎麦: Topped with cooked migaki nishin (身欠きニシン, dried fish of the Pacific herring).
- Sansai soba 山菜蕎麦 ("mountain vegetables soba"): Topped with sansai, or wild vegetables such as warabi, zenmai and takenoko (bamboo shoots).
- Sobagaki 蕎麦掻き: A chunk of dough made of buckwheat flour and hot water.
- Tanuki soba (たぬき蕎麦, literally "Japanese raccoon dog soba") (in Kantō) or Haikara soba ハイカラ蕎麦 (in Kansai): Topped with tenkasu (bits of deep-fried tempura batter).
- Tempura soba 天麩羅蕎麦: Topped with tempura, a large shrimp frequently is used, but vegetables are also popular. Some of soba venders use kakiage for this dish and this often is called Tensoba.
- Tororo soba とろろ蕎麦 or Yamakake soba 山かけ蕎麦: Topped with tororo, the puree of yamaimo (a Japanese yam with a mucilaginous texture).
- Tsukimi soba 月見蕎麦 ("moon-viewing soba"): Topped with raw egg, which poaches in the hot soup.
- Wakame soba 若布蕎麦: Topped with wakame seaweed.
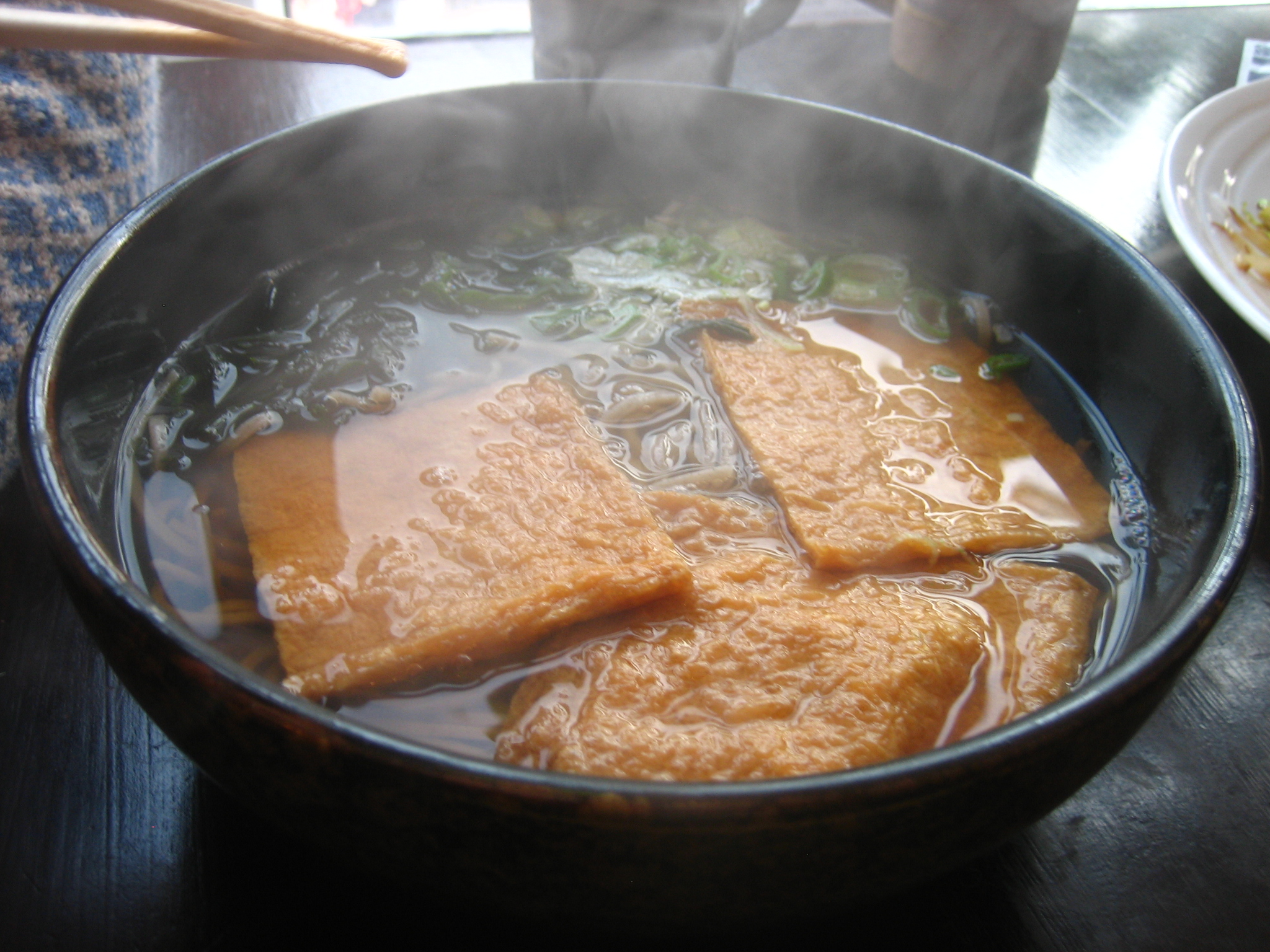
Kitsune soba in Brighton, East Sussex, UK (abura-age)

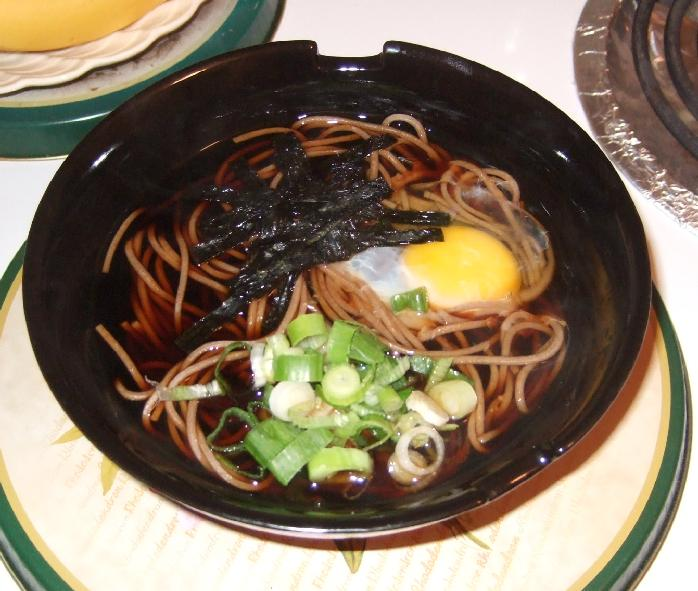
Tsukimi soba (raw egg)

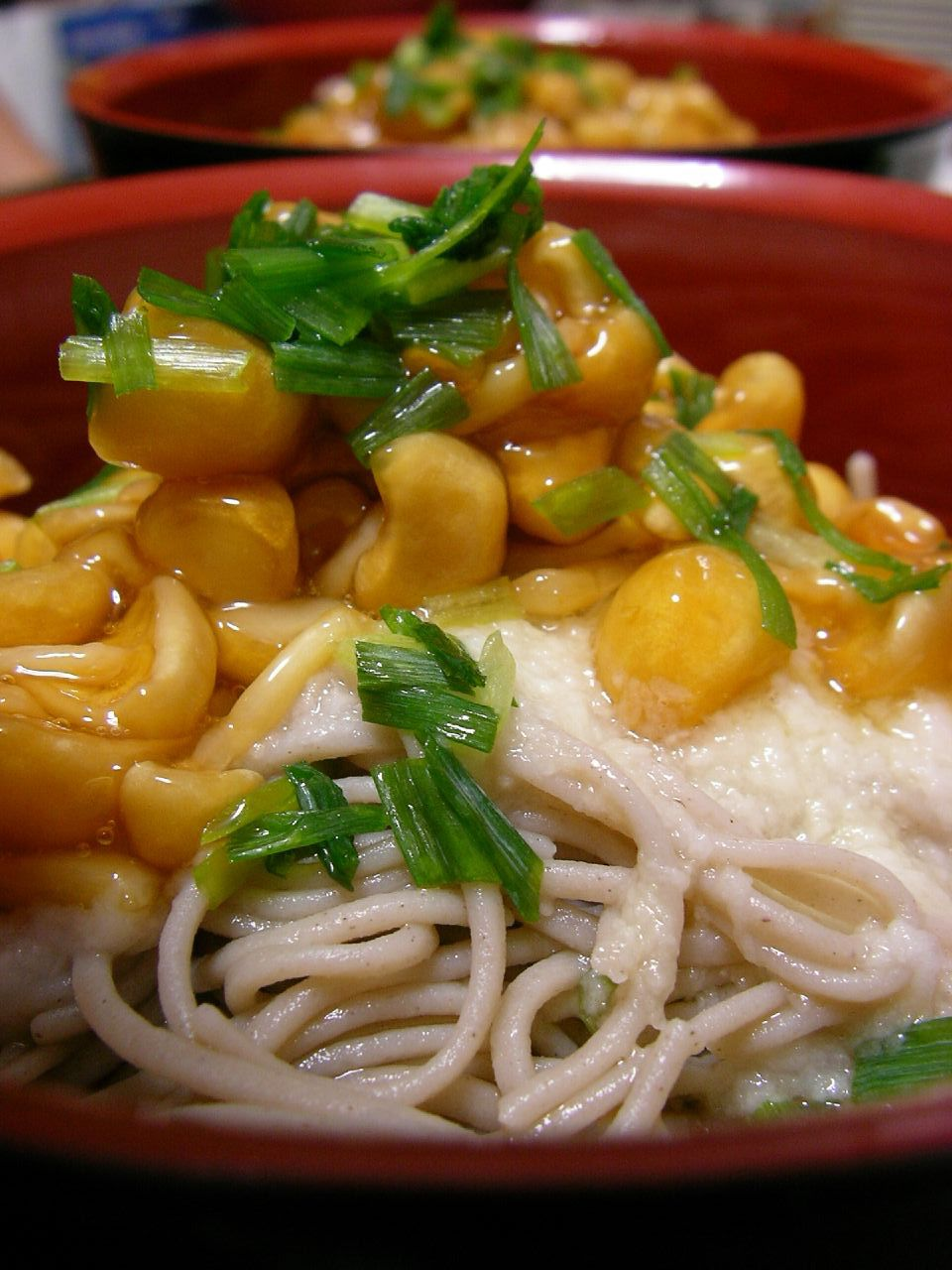
Nameko soba (nameko mushrooms)

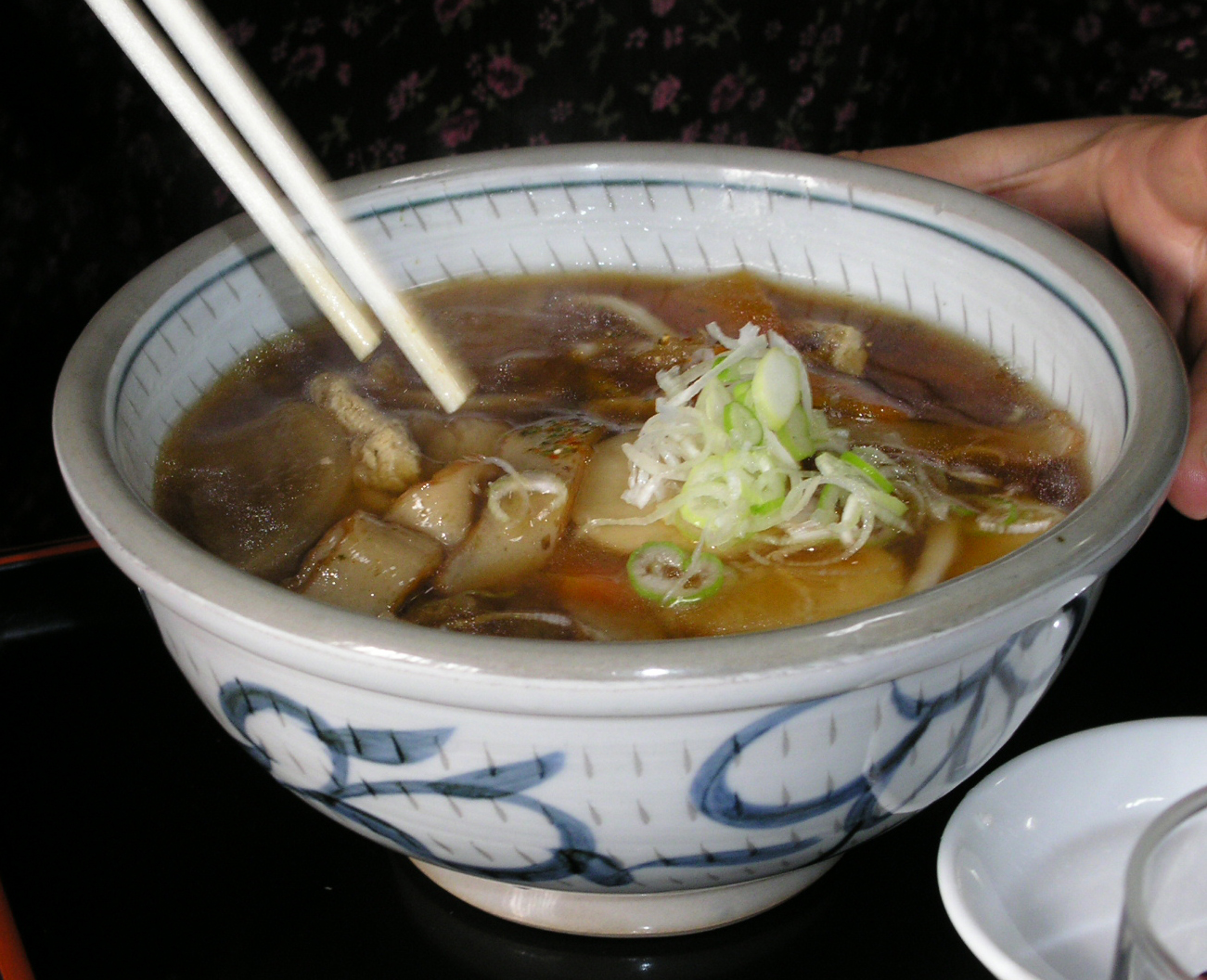
Kamonanban (duck)

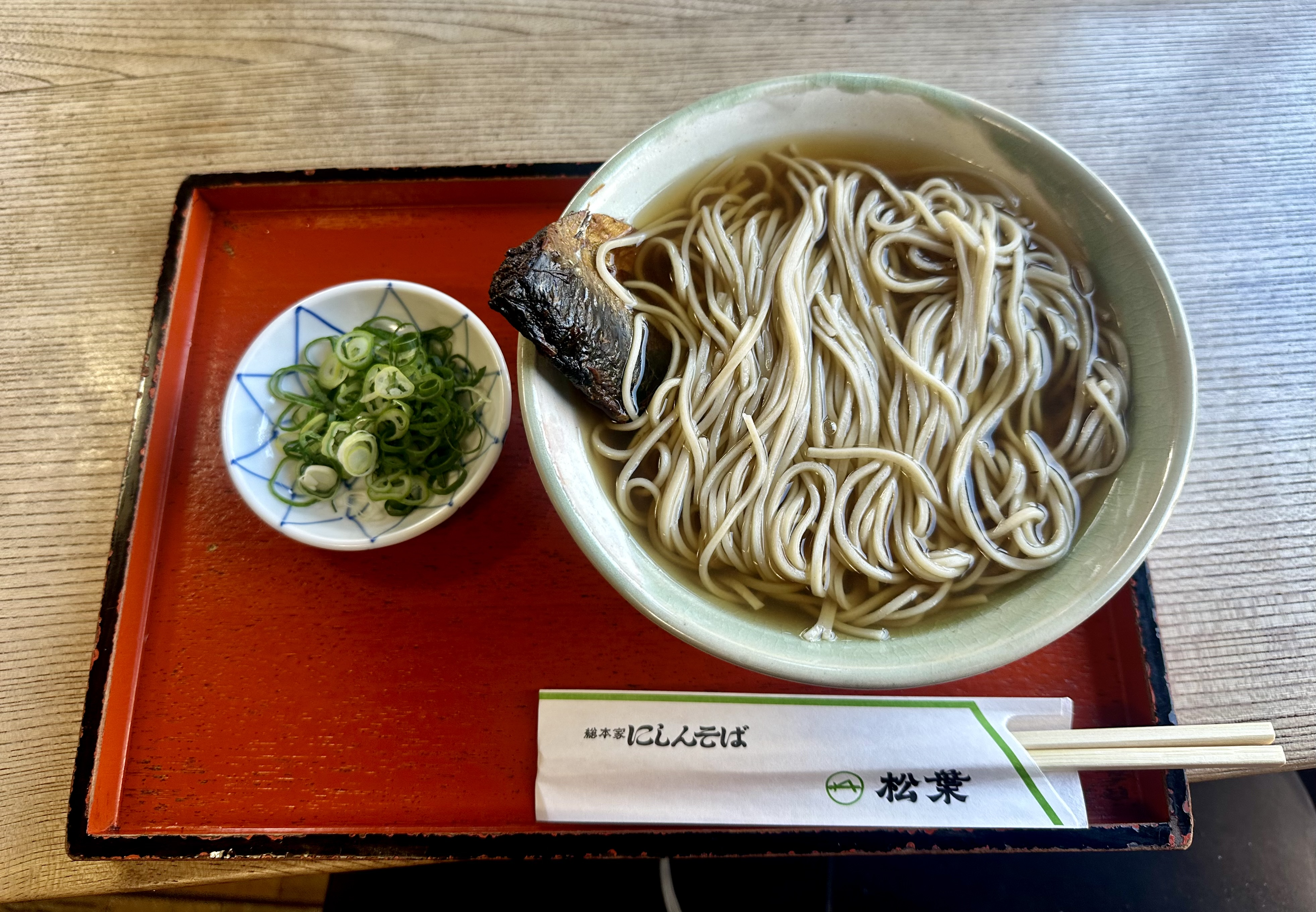
Nishin soba

Korokke soba

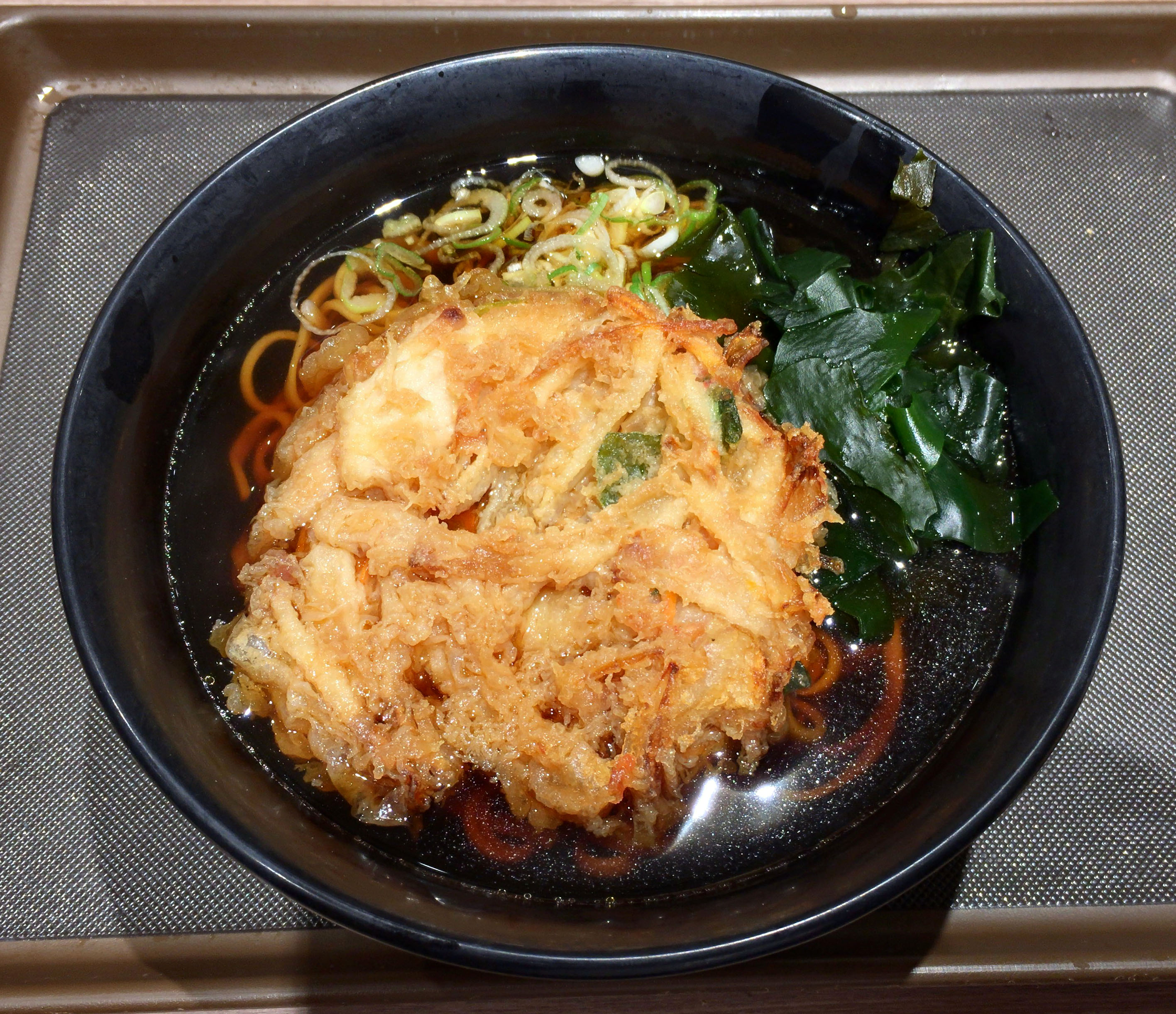
Tempura soba (kakiage)

== Noodle varieties ==
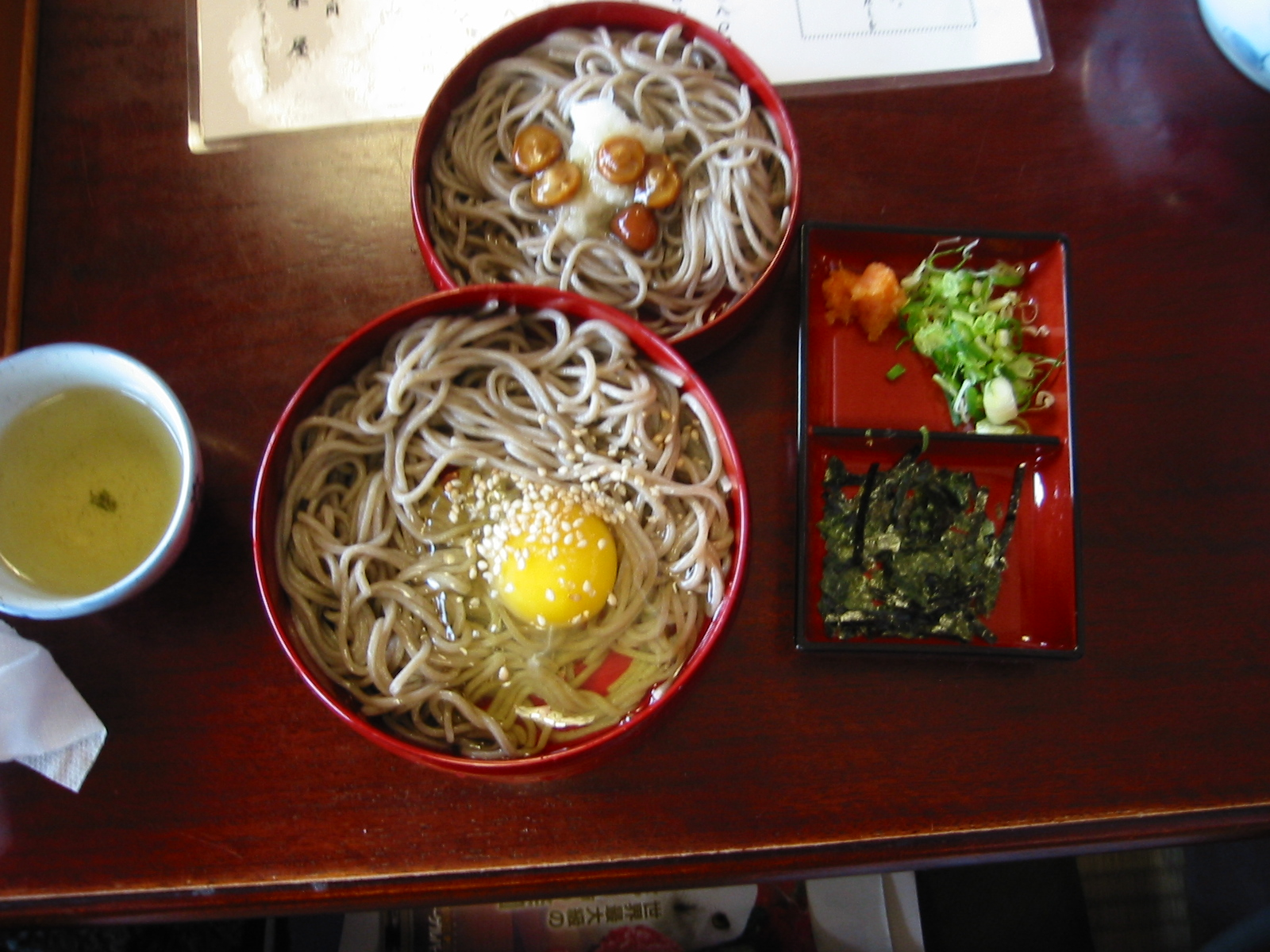
Izumo soba, named after Izumo, Shimane Prefecture

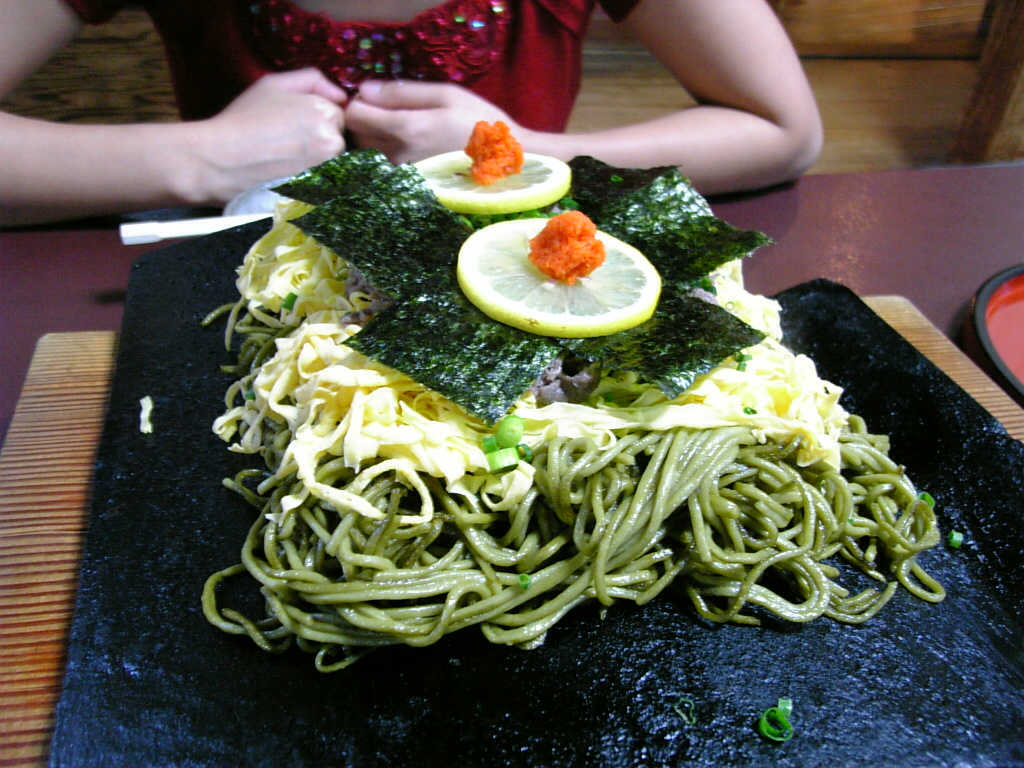
Matcha flavored soba

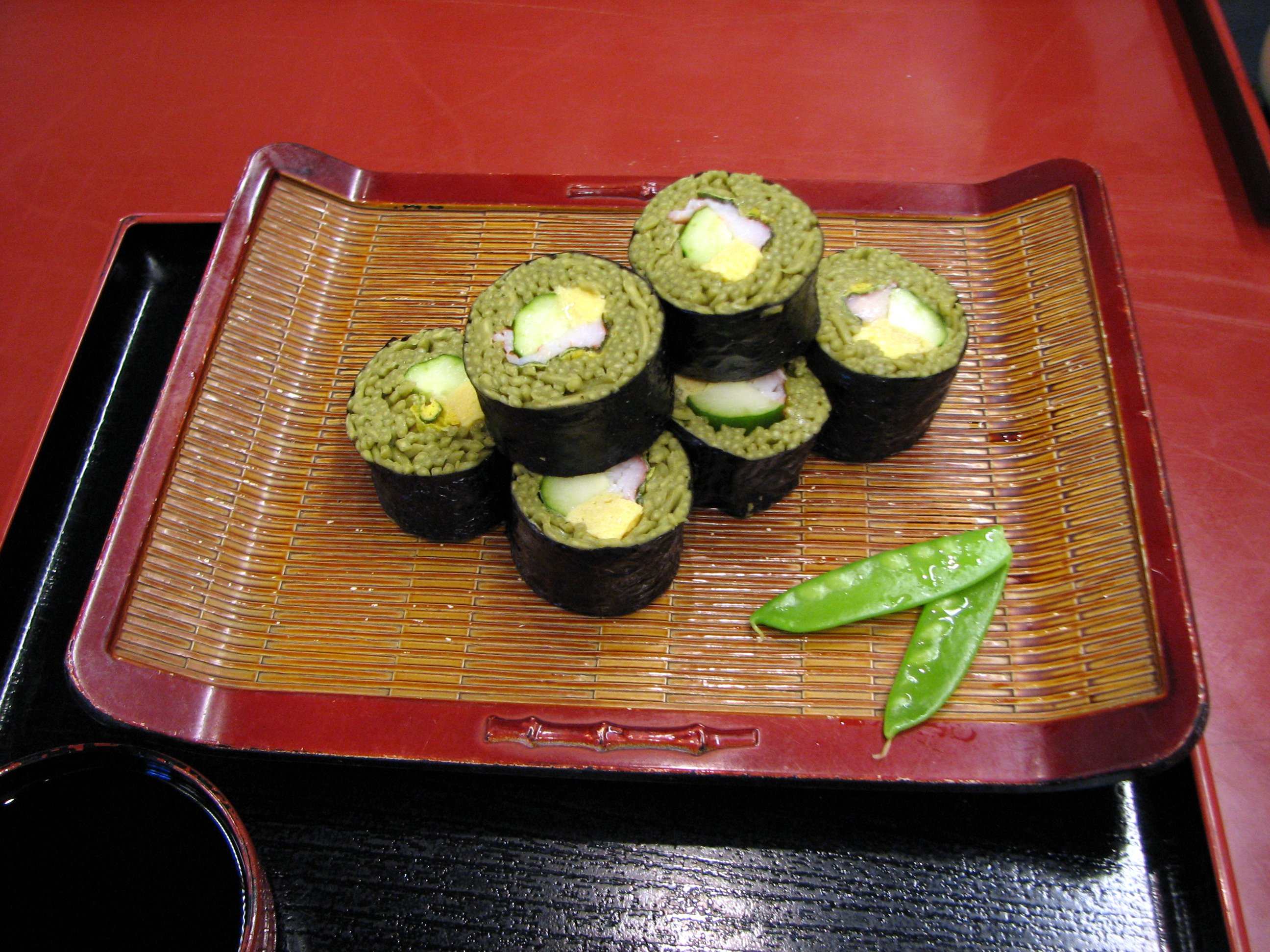
Sushi made with matcha flavored soba

Different flavors and types of soba noodles are available. In Japan, buckwheat is produced mainly in Hokkaido. Soba that is made with newly harvested buckwheat is called shin-soba. It is sweeter and more flavorful than regular soba.

Nagano Prefecture is famous for a variety of soba called shinshu soba, because the region's volcanic soil and temperature extremes are suited for growing buckwheat. From the Kurohime and Togakushi highlands in the north to the Kaida highlands in the south, and the prefecture boasts the second-highest production of soba in Japan. Many facilities integrate cultivation, milling and cutting, and provide soba cutting courses for customers, a major leisure activity in Nagano. Only noodles containing 40% or more buckwheat flour can carry the shinshu name.

=== By location ===
- Etanbetsu soba: named after the central region of Hokkaido (around Asahikawa city)
- Izumo soba: named after Izumo in Shimane
- Izushi soba: named after Izushi in Hyōgo
- Shinshu soba or Shinano soba: named after the old names of Nagano Prefecture

=== By ingredients ===
- Cha soba: flavored with green tea powder
- Hegi soba: flavored with funori seaweed. Originated in Uonuma, Niigata
- Jinenjo soba: flavored with wild yam, Japanese yam or Chinese yam flour
- Yomogi soba: flavored with mugwort
- Sarashina soba: thin, light-colored soba, made with refined buckwheat
- Inaka soba: "country soba", thick soba made with whole buckwheat
- Ni-hachi soba: "two-eight soba", soba containing 20% wheat and 80% buckwheat
- Towari soba or Juwari soba: 100% buckwheat soba.

== Outside Japan ==
A variation of Okinawa soba known as sobá is popular in the city of Campo Grande, in the Brazilian state of Mato Grosso do Sul due to influence of Okinawan immigrants. It is eaten all-year long at street markets or in special restaurants called "sobarias". As of 2019, the recipe has deviated from Okinawa style to suit Brazilian local preferences.

== Etiquette ==
Soba is typically eaten with chopsticks, and in Japan, it is considered acceptable to slurp the noodles noisily. This is especially common with hot noodles, as drawing up the noodles quickly into the mouth helps cool them. However, quiet consumption of noodles is no longer uncommon.

== Delivery ==
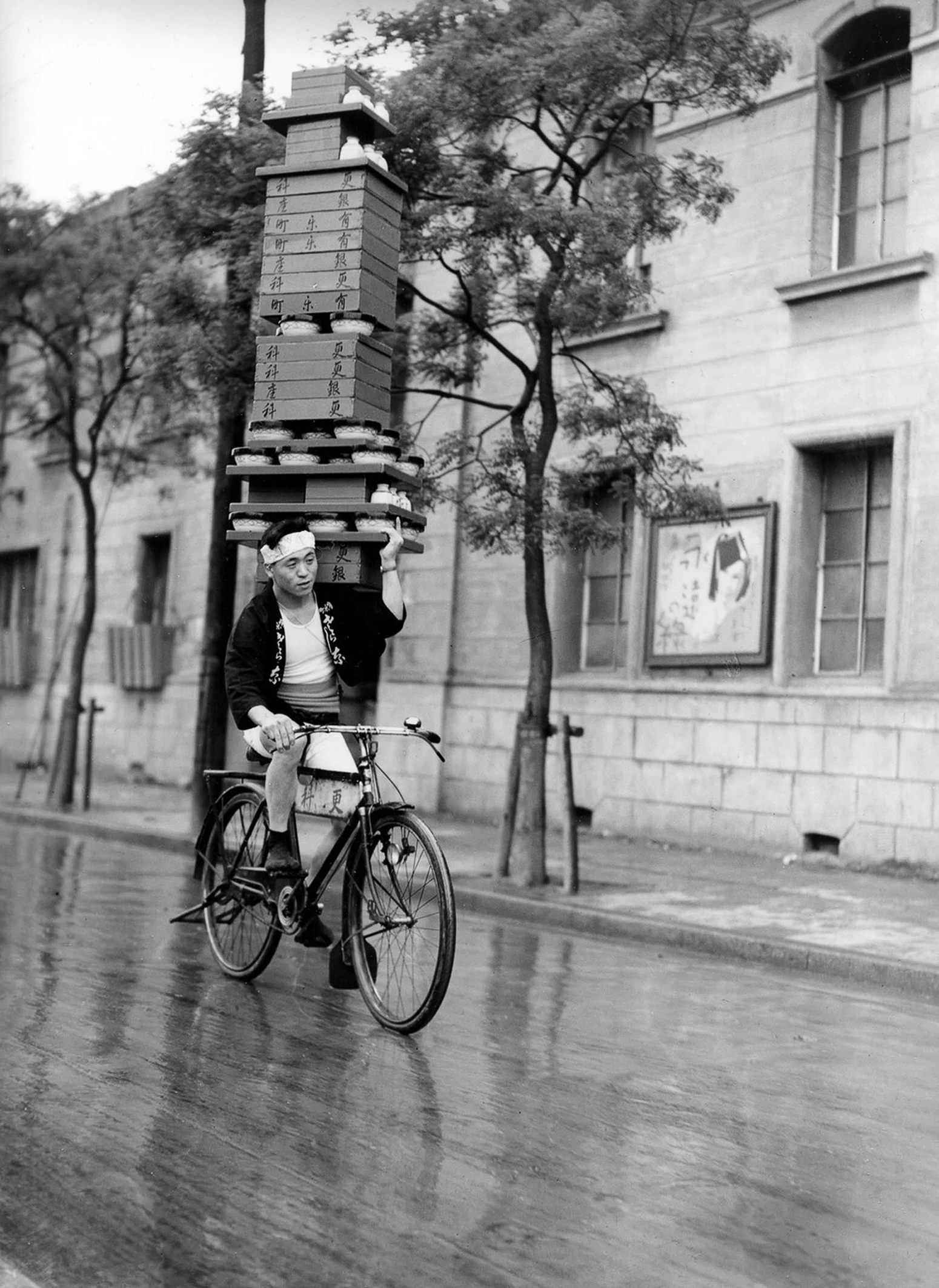
Soba noodle deliveryman carrying stacked bowls in Tokyo, 1935

Food delivery services called demae (出前) originally served wealthy daimyō (lords) in the 1700s. Until the late Shōwa period (1926–1989), stacks of soba bowls were carried on the shoulders of deliverymen on bicycles.

In March 1961, new cycling traffic laws added restrictions. Officials of the Tokyo Metropolitan Police Department stated: "To ride on a bicycle with piles of soba bowls on your shoulder is dangerous. It must be prohibited from the viewpoint of road traffic safety. But we will not place any stricter curb as they will lose more than half their customers", and, "With this police assurance to overlook the illegal traffic practice, soba delivery boys will continue to race through the streets of Tokyo."

Although soba is still delivered today, motorised scooters have replaced the bicycles. The Honda Super Cub motorcycle was designed with soba delivery in mind.

== Nutritional value ==
100 grams of cooked soba yields 99 kcal (410 kJ) of energy. Soba contains all nine essential amino acids, including lysine, which common wheat does not contain.

Soba contains a type of polysaccharide that is easily digested. Soba noodles also contain antioxidants, including rutin and quercetin, and essential nutrients including choline, thiamine and riboflavin.

== See also ==
- Frozen noodles
- Japanese cuisine
- List of buckwheat dishes
- List of noodles
- Ramen
- Toshikoshi soba
- Yakisoba
