= Wild duck =

The wild duck is the non-domesticated ancestor of the domestic duck.

Wild duck may refer to:

- Mallard
- Muscovy duck
