= Kakiage =

Japanese dish

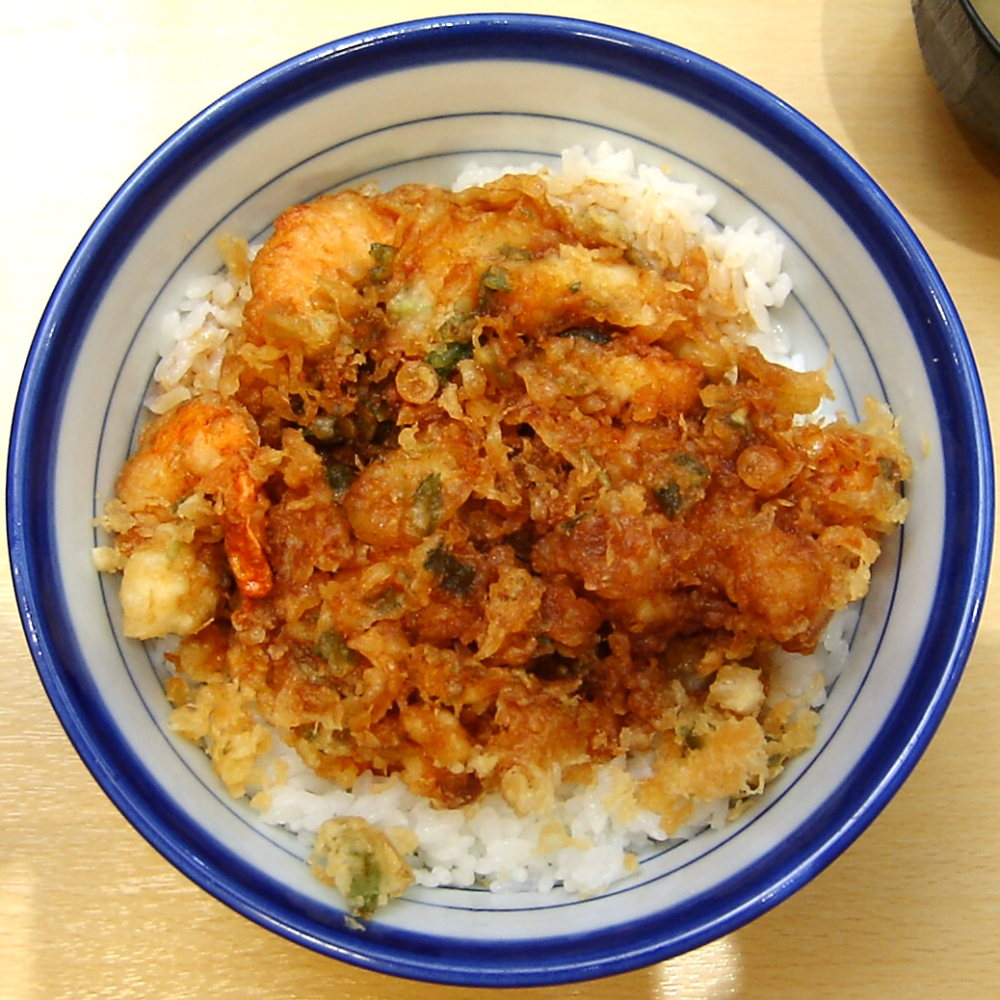
- Kaki age don (kaki age tendon)

Kakiage or kaki-age (かき揚げ, 掻き揚げ or かきあげ), a Japanese dish, is a type of tempura. It is made by batter-dipping and deep-frying a batch of ingredients such as shrimp bits (or a clump of small-sized shrimp). Kakiage may use other seafood such as small scallops, shredded vegetables or a combination of such ingredients.

== General description ==
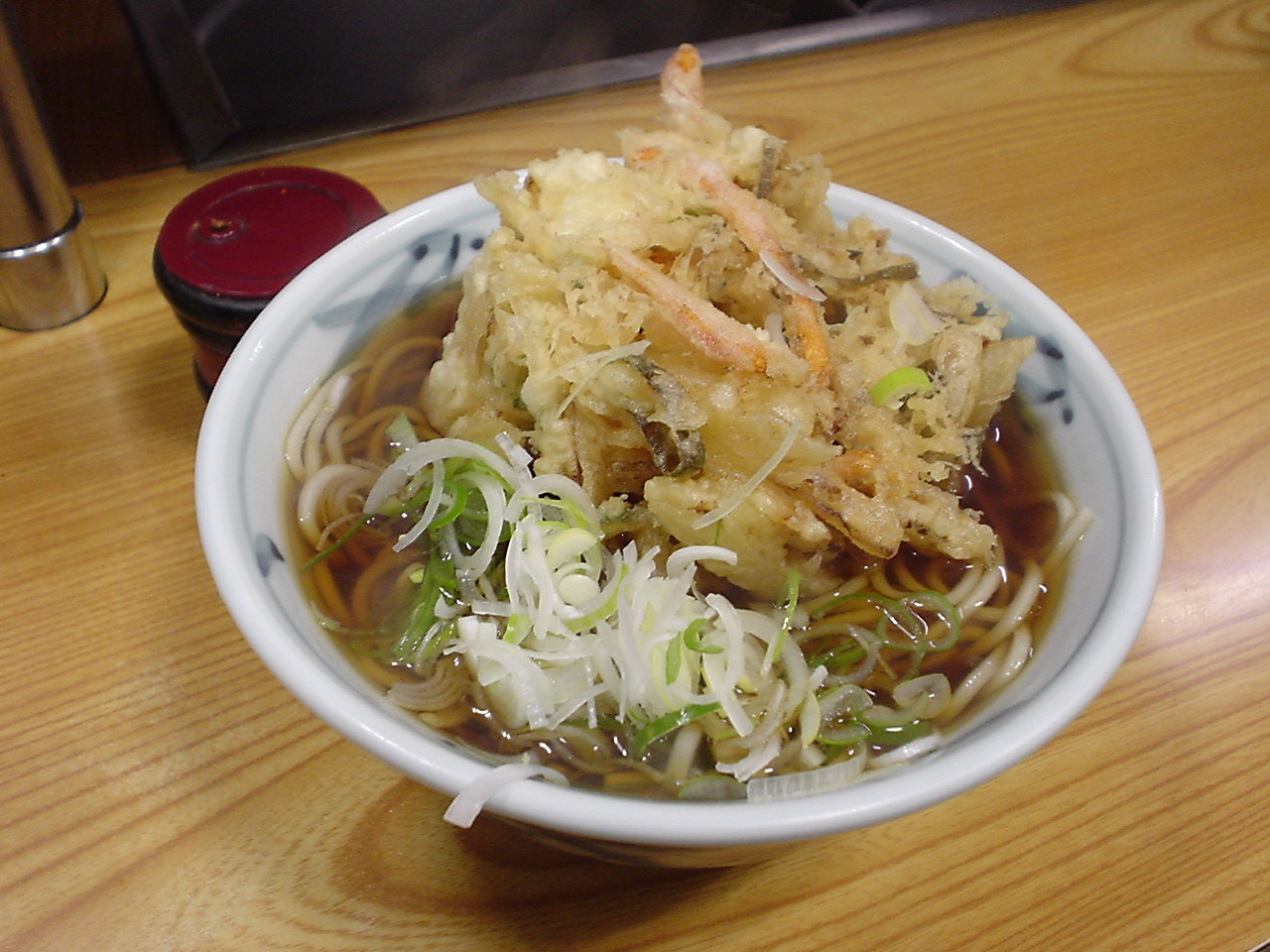
A kaki age soba (tempura soba)

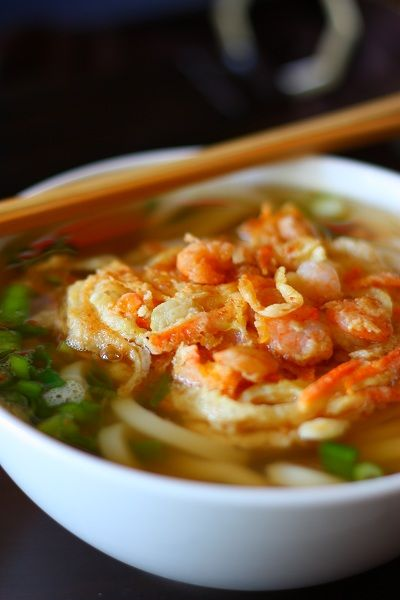
Kaki age udon

Kakiage is a type of tempura that uses small pieces of seafood, or vegetable or both.

Sometimes the main ingredients are clumps of fish or shellfish that are individually small, or chopped into small pieces.

The variety of seafood used include shrimp, mollusks like scallop, or fish, and can be combined with vegetables such as onion or mitsuba. The kakiage may also use vegetarian ingredients such as carrots, burdock, or onions chopped into matchsticks or into bits.

=== Preparation ===
The lump being fried is shaped into disks, (Note: Rather than into balls or other shapes.) and the kakiage are sometimes described as a pancake of sorts. It is also referred to as a type of fritter.

The recipe may call for gently sliding the dollop of battered ingredients into hot oil, and since it may try to break apart, a spatula may be used to hold it into place until the shape has set. There is a modern-day implement being sold called a kakiage ring to assist in its cooking—a cylindrical, perforated sheet-metal mold on a handle.

In traditional preparation, these small pieces breaking apart must be constantly "raked together" (Japanese: kakiageru (掻き上げる)).

=== Serving options ===
Kakiage may be eaten with tentsuyu or tempura dipping sauce and grated daikon radishes, or with seasoned salt, just like any other type of tempura.

It may also be served as a kakiage donburi or kakiage don, which is a rice bowl dish with a piece of kakiage placed on top of steamed rice. A tendon (tempura bowl) may also include a piece of kakiage among other tempura morsels.

Kakiage may top a bowl of kakesoba (hot soba in broth) or udon.

=== Ingredients used in Japan ===
The kakiage typically uses a type of shrimp called shiba ebi (Metapenaeus spp.), whereas the individual whole shrimp tempura commonly uses both the shiba ebi and saimaki ebi (juvenile kuruma ebi).

Another standard is using a type of small "scallops" called kobashira which are actually the adductor muscles of the bakagai or aoyagi clams (Mactra chinensis).

Kakiage using fresh sakura shrimp are usually offered in the vicinity of Suruga Bay, Shizuoka Prefecture where these are caught, although some recipes may call for the dried sakura shrimp which are more widely available.

== Etymology ==
The kakiage is so-named because one "mixes up" kakimazeru (かき混ぜる) the ingredients before they are fried, or so it has been claimed, e.g., by the tempura chef and proprietor of Tenkichi in Yokohama.

Scholar Ikeda Yasaburō also introduces the same etymology, anecdotally quoting another tempura chef. (Note: This chef was lecturing to a customer that the kakiage he ordered was not deep-fried kaki, which would be kaki furai.)

== History ==
Morisada mankō (written 1837–1853) stated that the tempura offered at soba noodle shops at the time used shiba ebi shrimp (Metapenaeus joyneri). According to a soba researcher, tempura soba was invented around the Bunsei era (1818–1830), using the shiba ebi shrimp kakiage as topping.

The former shogun Tokugawa Yoshinobu (1837–1913) was a regular customer at the tempura restaurant Tenkin, where he would order an especially large kakiage, served on a Nabeshima plate.

== See also ==
- Japanese cuisine
- List of Japanese dishes
- Crispy kangkóng
- Okoy

== Citations ==
=== Bibliography ===
- Hashimoto, Reiko (2016). Hashi: A Japanese Cookery Course. Bloomsbury Publishing. pp. 98, 117. ISBN 9781472933133.
- Okuyama, Masuaki 奧山益朗 (1972). Mikaku jiten 味覚辞典 (snippet). Tokyodo Shuppan. p. 141.
- Ono, Tadashi; Salat, Harris (2013). Japanese Soul Cooking: Ramen, Tonkatsu, Tempura, and More from the Streets and Kitchens of Tokyo and Beyond. Ten Speed Press. pp. 121–124. ISBN 9781607743521.
