= Agedashi dōfu =

Japanese tofu dish

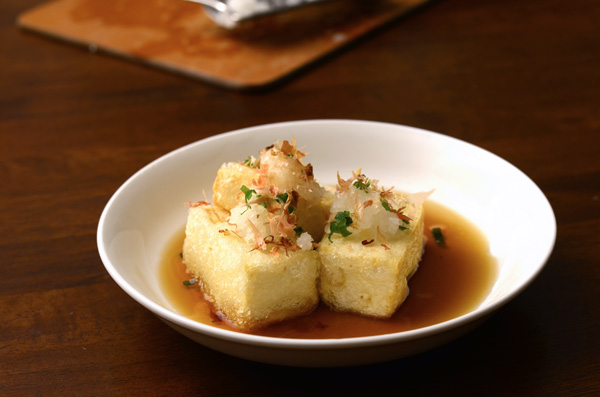
- Agedashi dōfu, fried tofu
- Place of origin: Japan
- Serving temperature: Side dish
- Main ingredients: Tofu, potato starch, corn starch, negi, daikon

Agedashi dōfu (揚げ出し豆腐, "lightly deep-fried tofu") is a Japanese hot tofu dish. Soft or medium-firm silken tofu (kinugoshi) is cut into cubes, before being lightly dusted with potato starch or cornstarch and then deep-fried until golden brown. It is then served in a hot broth (tentsuyu) made of dashi, mirin, and shō-yu (Japanese soy sauce), with finely-chopped negi (a type of spring onion) and grated daikon or katsuobushi (dried skipjack tuna flakes) sprinkled on top.

== History ==
Agedashi dōfu is an old and well-known dish. It was included in Japanese tofu cookbook entitled Tofu Hyakuchin (lit. 'one hundred tofu'), published in 1782, alongside other tofu dishes such as chilled tofu (hiyayakko) and simmered tofu (yudofu).

== Other agedashi dishes ==
While agedashi dōfu is the best-known agedashi dish, some other dishes may be prepared with similar techniques. These include agedashinasu (揚げ出し茄子), using eggplant.

== Gallery ==
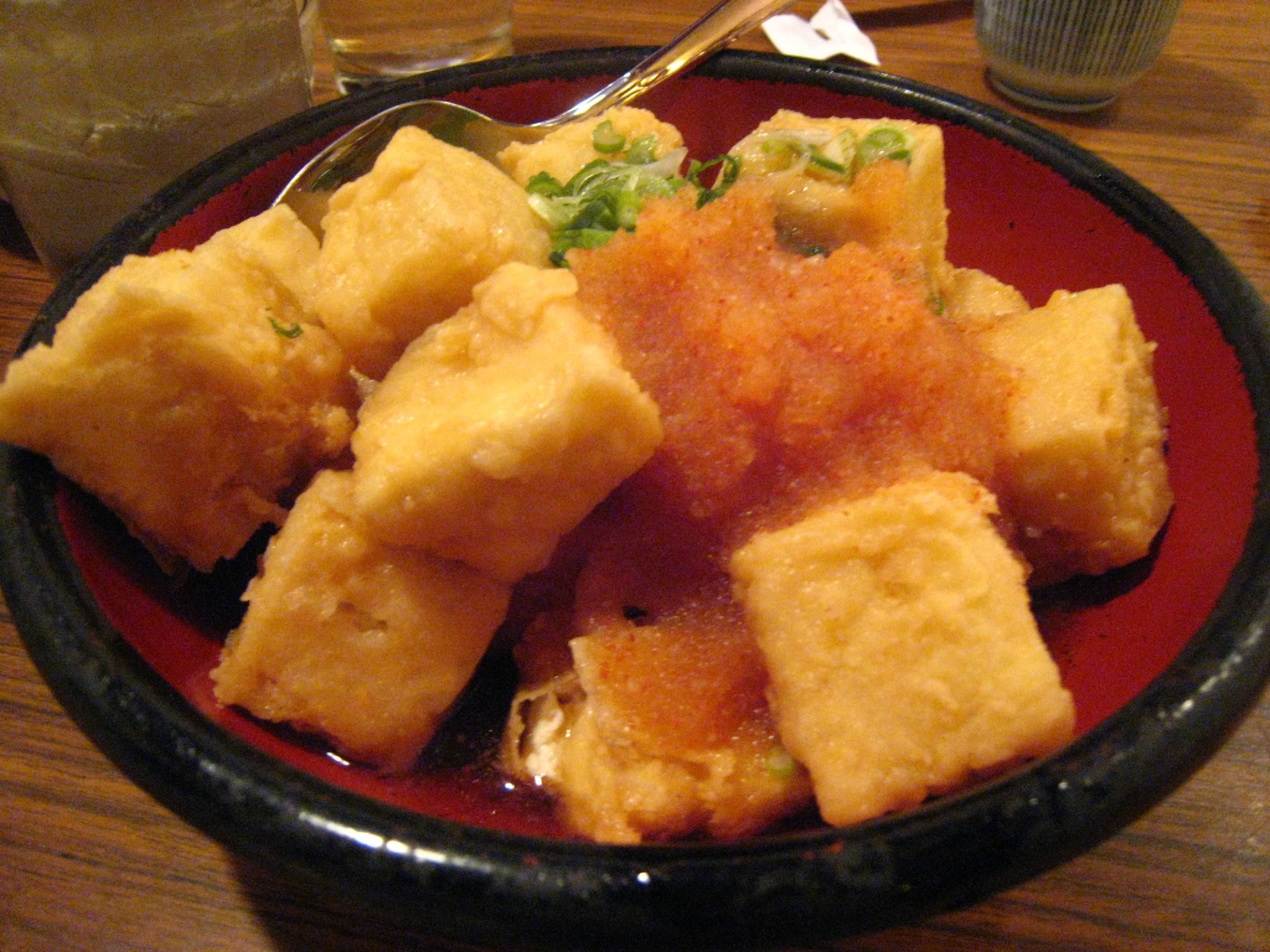

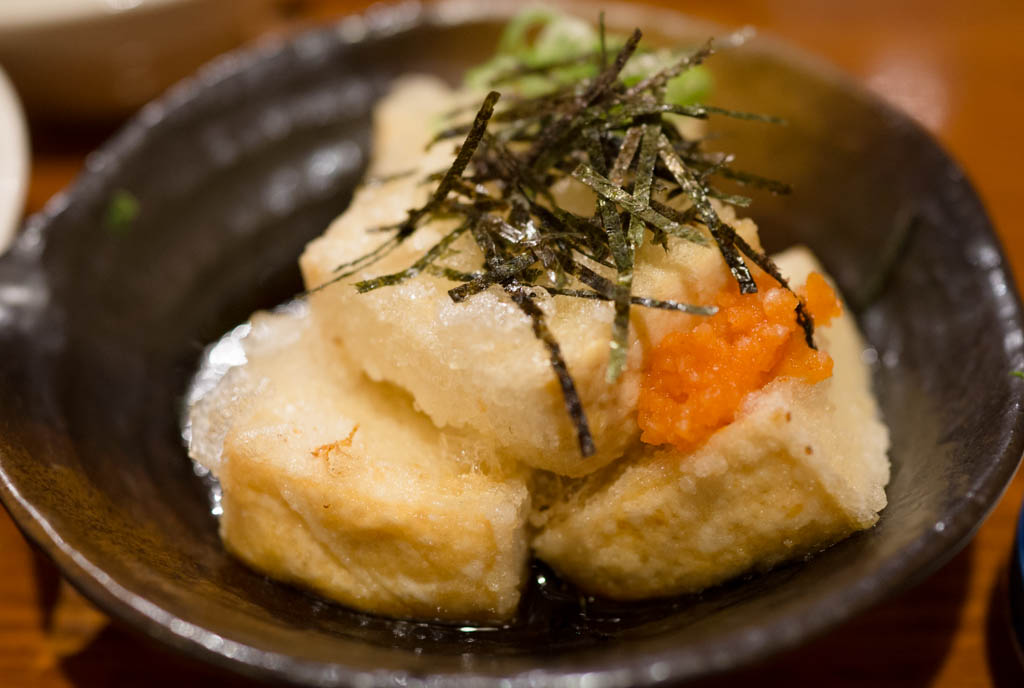

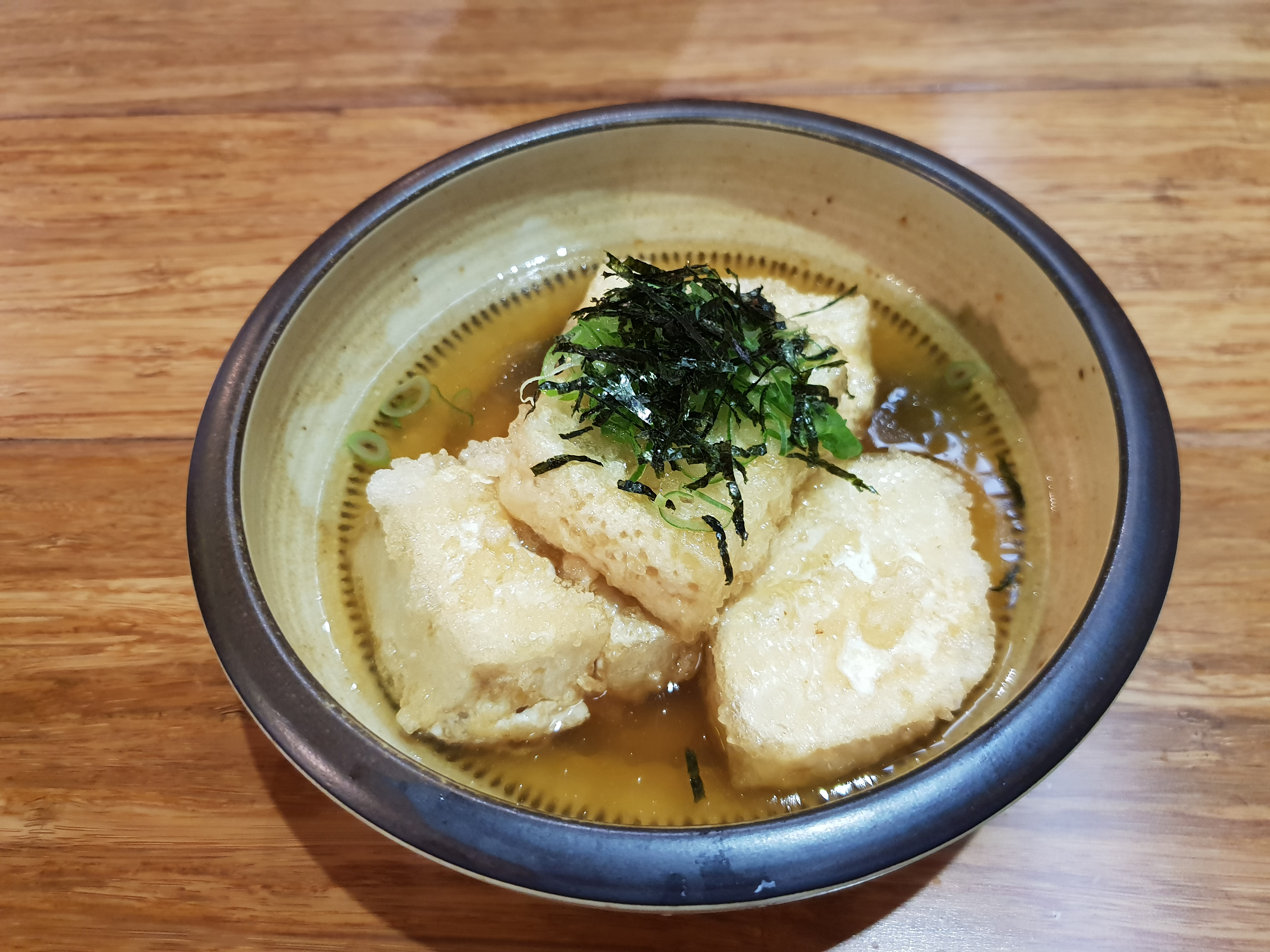

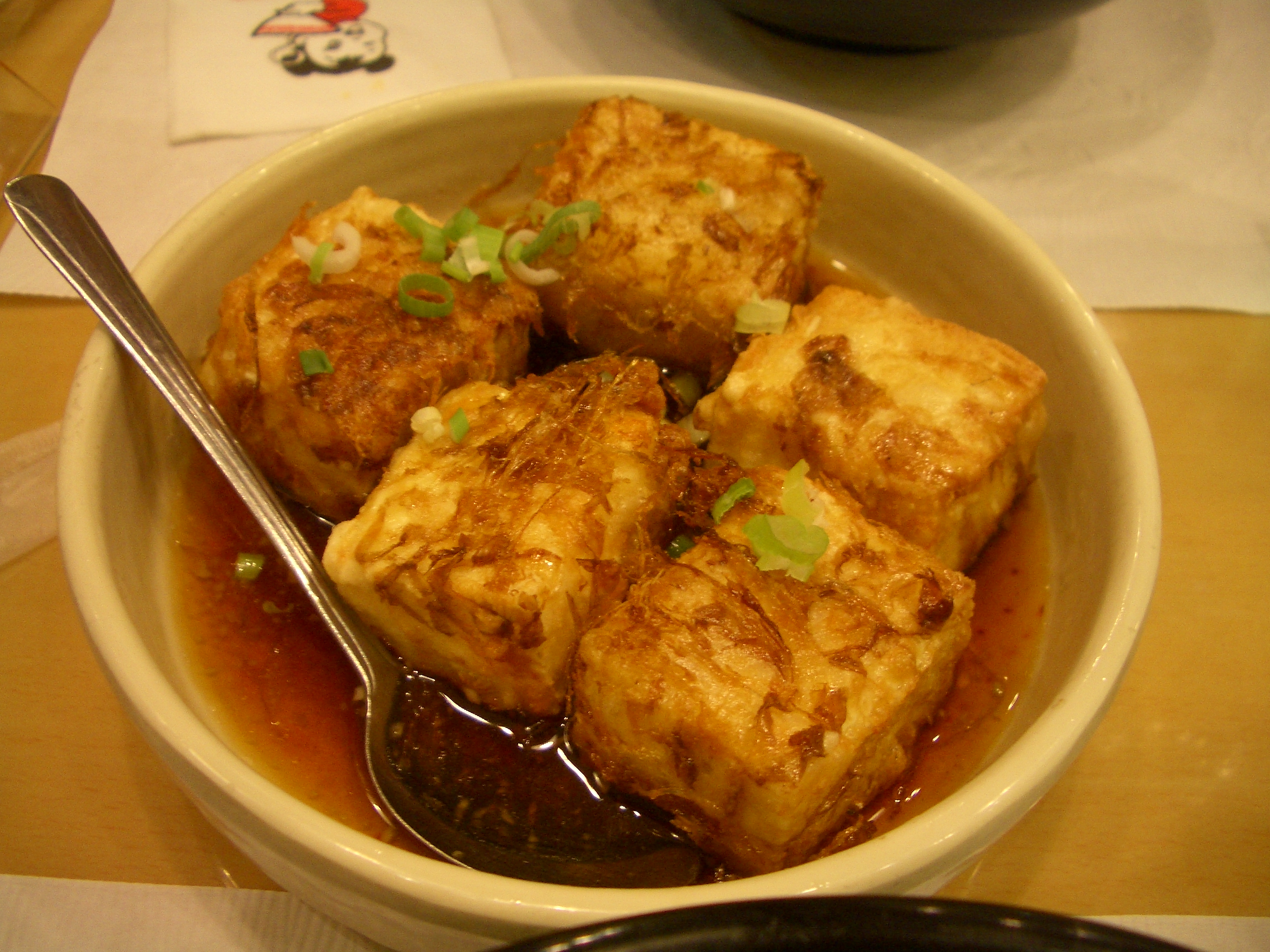

== See also ==
- List of tofu dishes
