= Furai =

Japanese deep-fried and breaded food

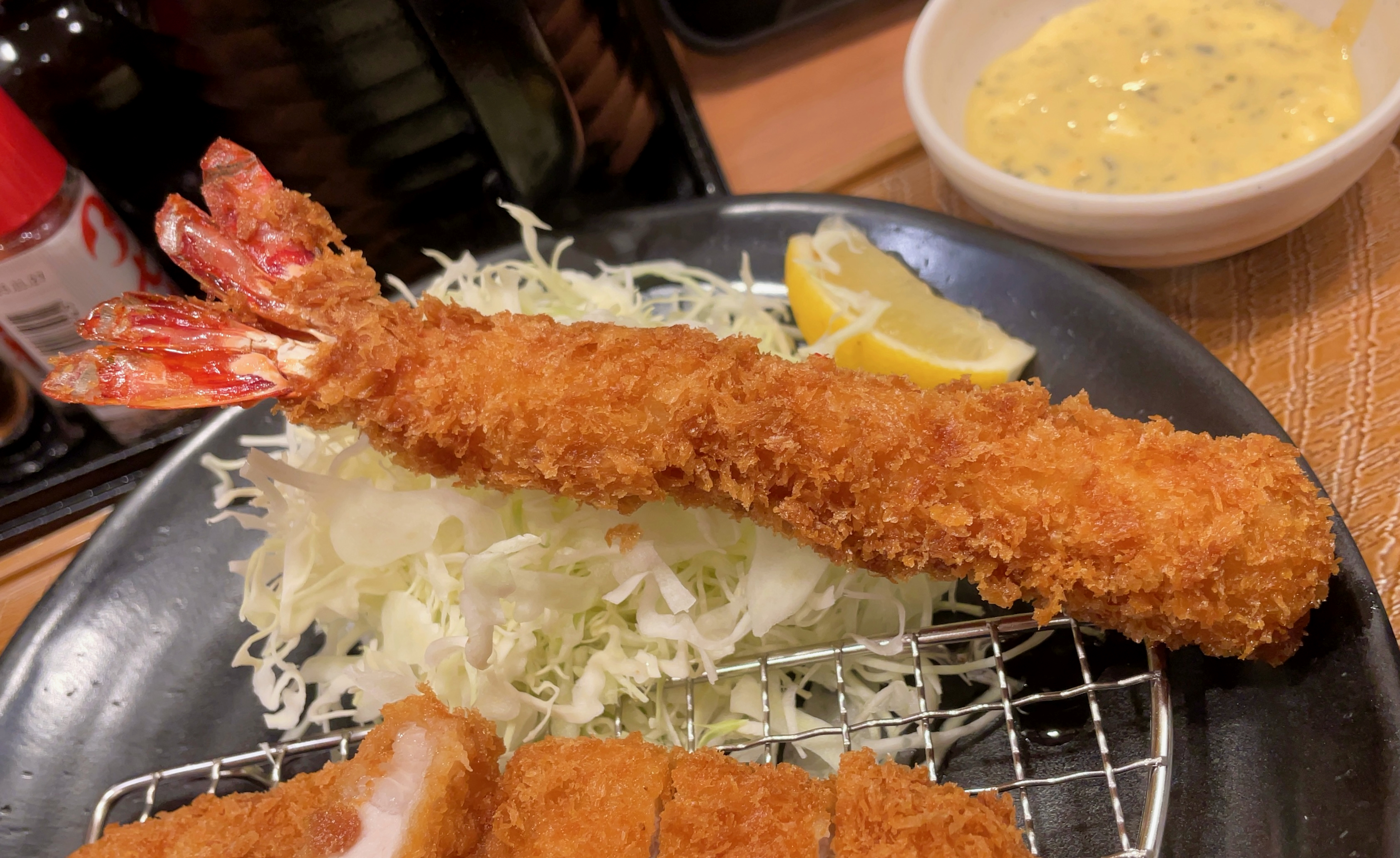
Ebi furai

Furai (フライ) is a form of yōshoku (Western-influenced Japanese cuisine) developed in the late 19th and early 20th century. The term refers to breaded seafood or vegetables, while breaded meats such as pork and chicken are considered to be another form of yōshoku known as katsu (cutlets). The word furai is a transliteration of the English word fry.

The main types of furai are:

- Ebi furai (エビフライ, 海老フライ) - breaded shrimp
- Kaki furai (カキフライ, 牡蠣フライ) - breaded oyster
- Aji furai (アジフライ, あじフライ, 鰺フライ) - breaded Japanese horse mackerel

They are usually served with shredded cabbage and/or shredded lettuce, Japanese Worcestershire sauce or tonkatsu sauce, and lemon.

Furai differs from tempura in that the latter is fried in a light batter, rather than breading, and is typically served with tentsuyu. Tempura is generally classified as washoku (traditional Japanese cuisine) due to the fact that it was integrated into the cuisine several centuries earlier.
