= Tempura =

Japanese dish of battered, deep-fried fish or vegetables

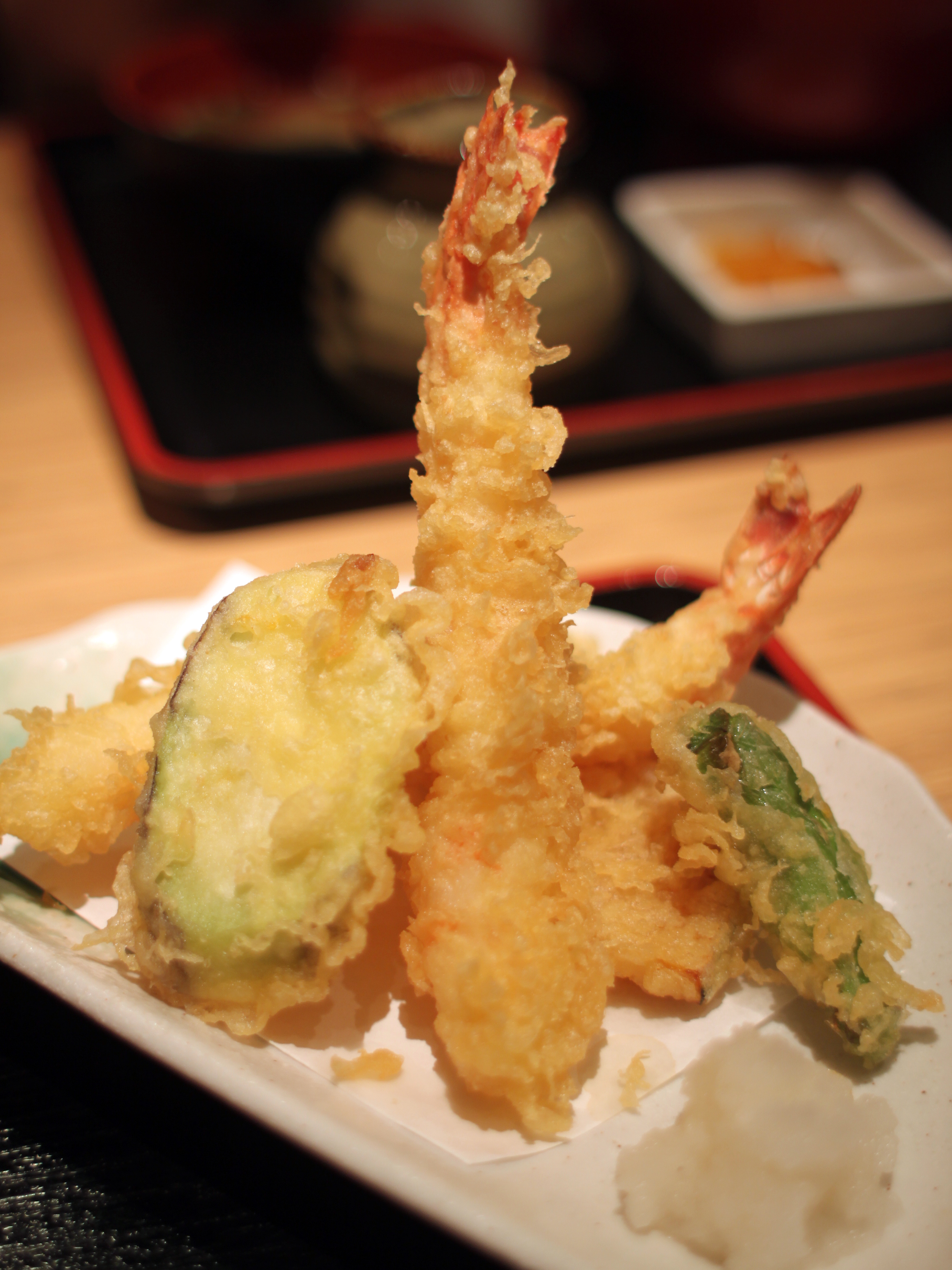
- Alternative names: Tenpura
- Place of origin: Nagasaki, by Portuguese missionaries
- Region or state: Western Europe; East Asia
- Associated cuisine: Japanese cuisine

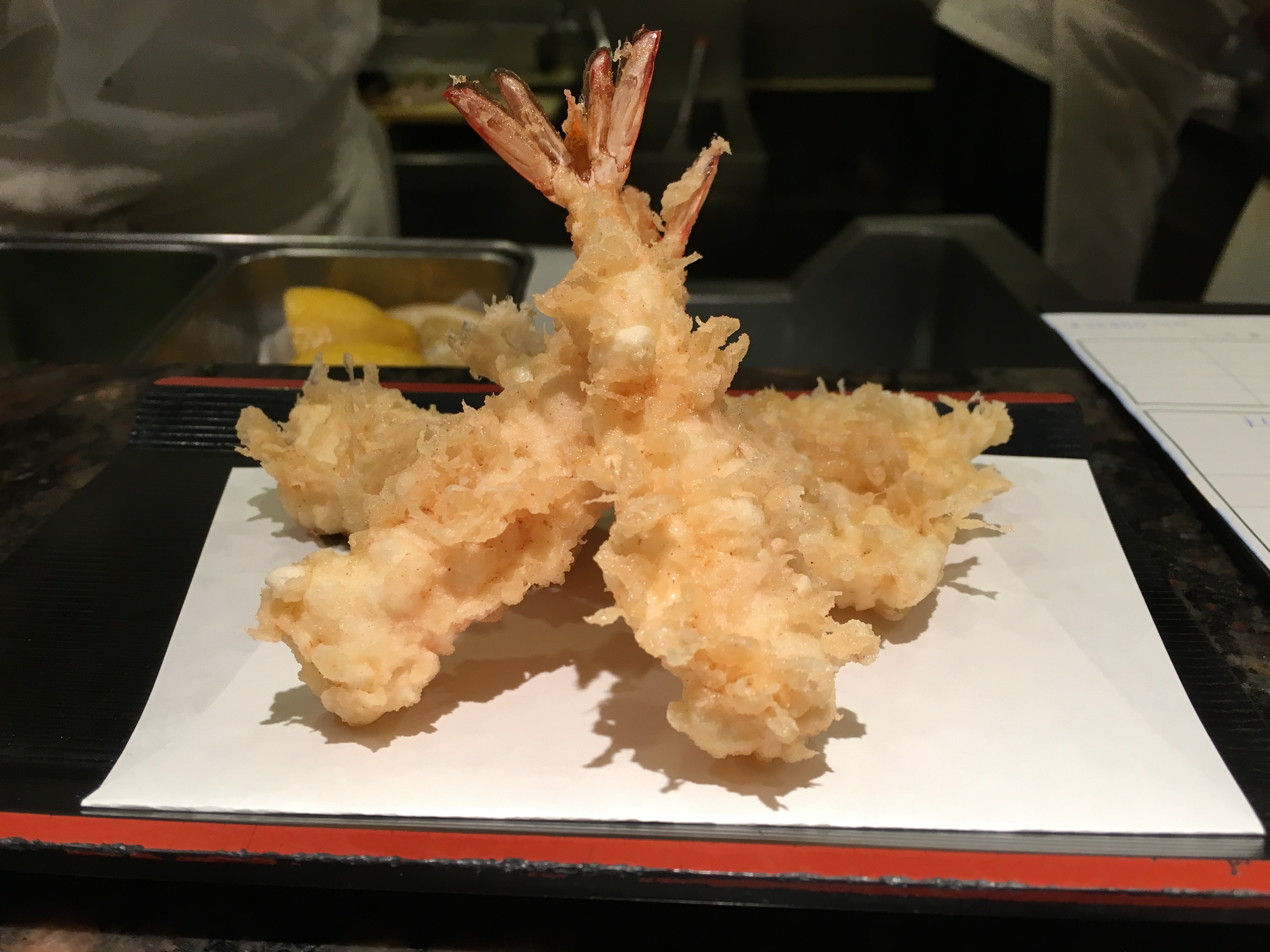
Tempura shrimp and vegetables

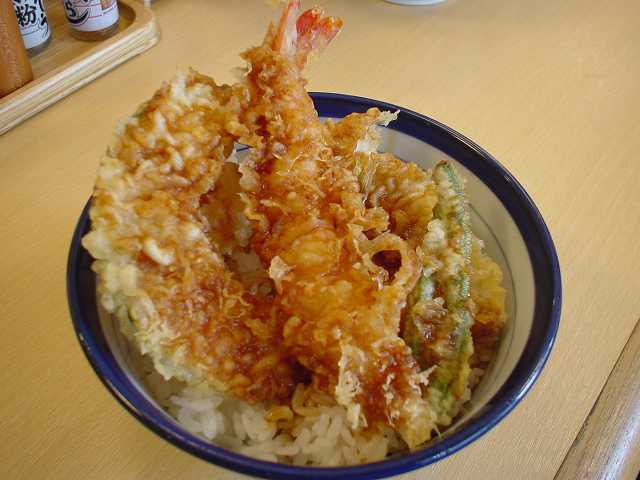
Tendon

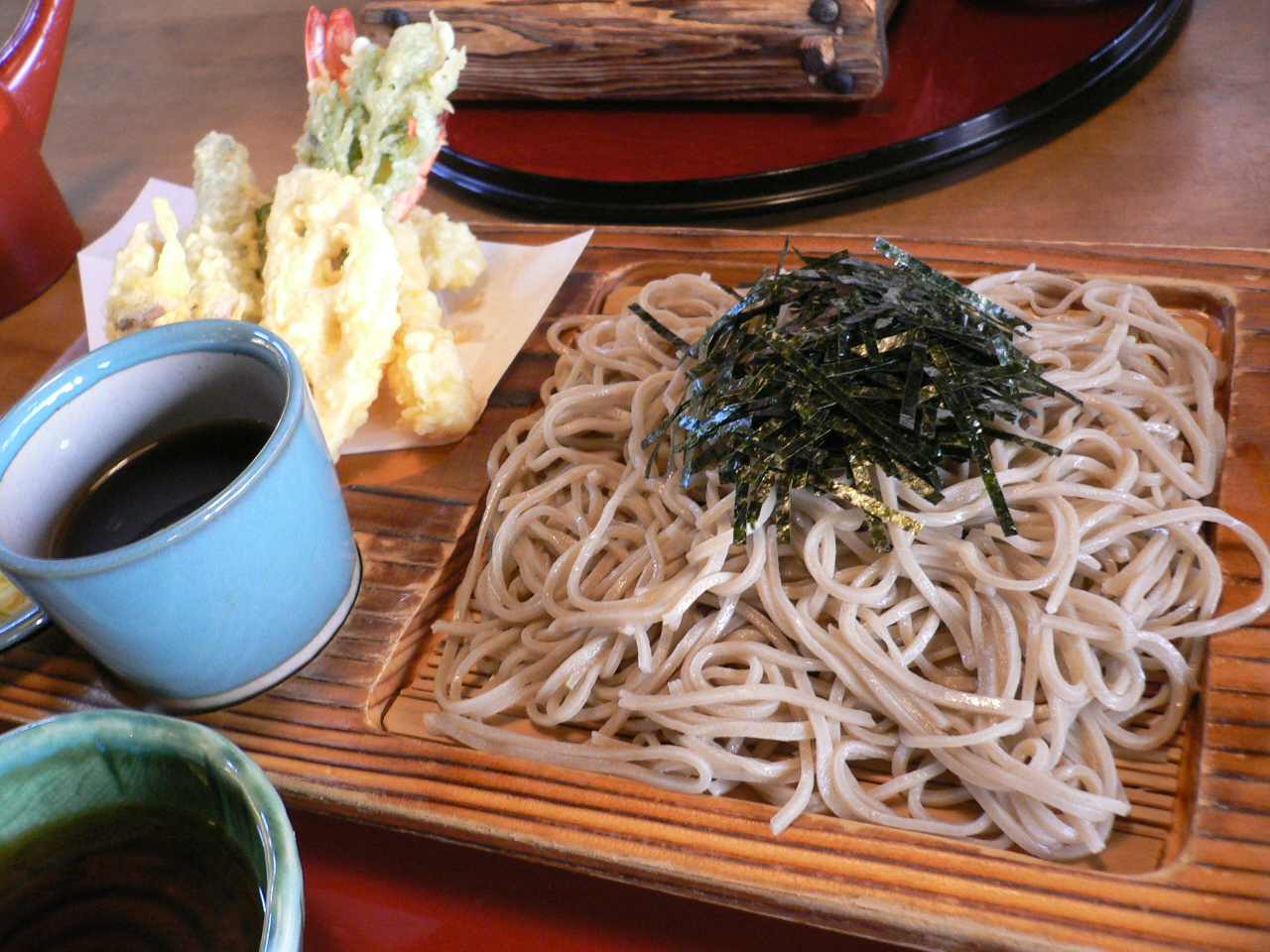
Tenzaru (tempura and soba)

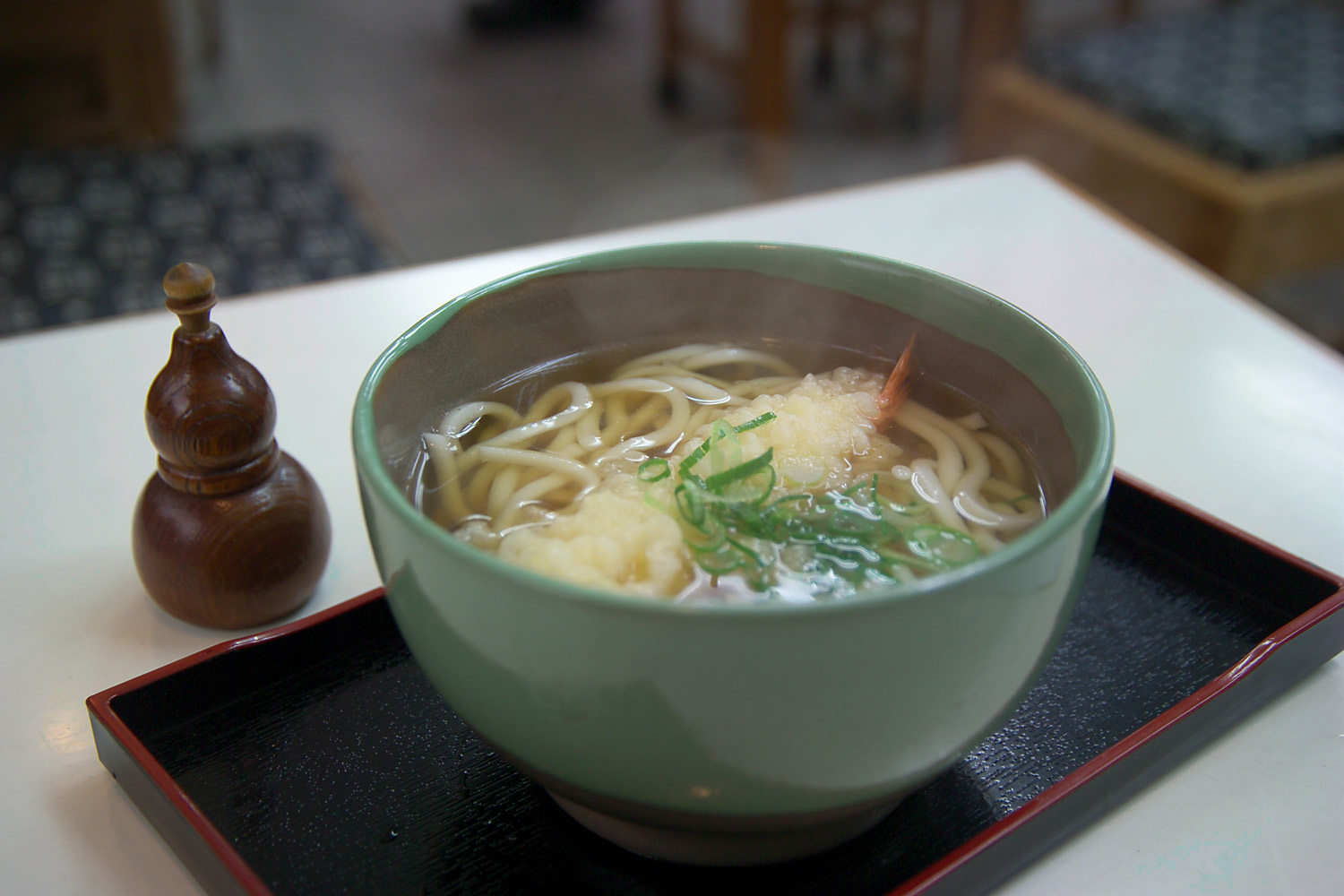
Tempura udon

Tempura (天(てん)ぷら or 天(てん)麩(ぷ)羅(ら); [tempɯɾa]) is a Japanese dish that usually consists of seafood and vegetables that have been coated in a thin batter and deep-fried. Tempura originated in the 16th century, when Portuguese Jesuits brought the Western-style cooking method of coating foods with flour and frying, via Nanban trade.

== Preparation ==
=== Batter ===
A light batter is made of iced water, eggs, and soft wheat flour (cake, pastry or all-purpose flour). Sometimes baking soda or baking powder is added to make the batter light. Using sparkling water in place of plain water has a similar effect. Tempura batter is traditionally mixed in small batches using chopsticks for only a few seconds, leaving lumps in the mixture that, along with the cold batter temperature, result in a unique fluffy and crisp tempura structure when cooked. The batter is often kept cold by adding ice or placing the bowl inside a larger bowl with ice. Overmixing the batter will activate wheat gluten, which causes the flour mixture to become soft and dough-like when fried.

Specially formulated tempura flour is available in supermarkets. This is generally light (low-gluten) flour and occasionally contains leaveners such as baking powder.

Tempura does not use breadcrumbs (panko) in the coating. Deep-fried foods that are coated with breadcrumbs are called furai, Japanese-invented Western-style deep-fried foods, such as tonkatsu or ebi furai (fried prawn).

No seasonings or salt are added to the batter, or the ingredients, except for some recipes recommending rinsing seafood in salt water before preparation.

=== Frying ===
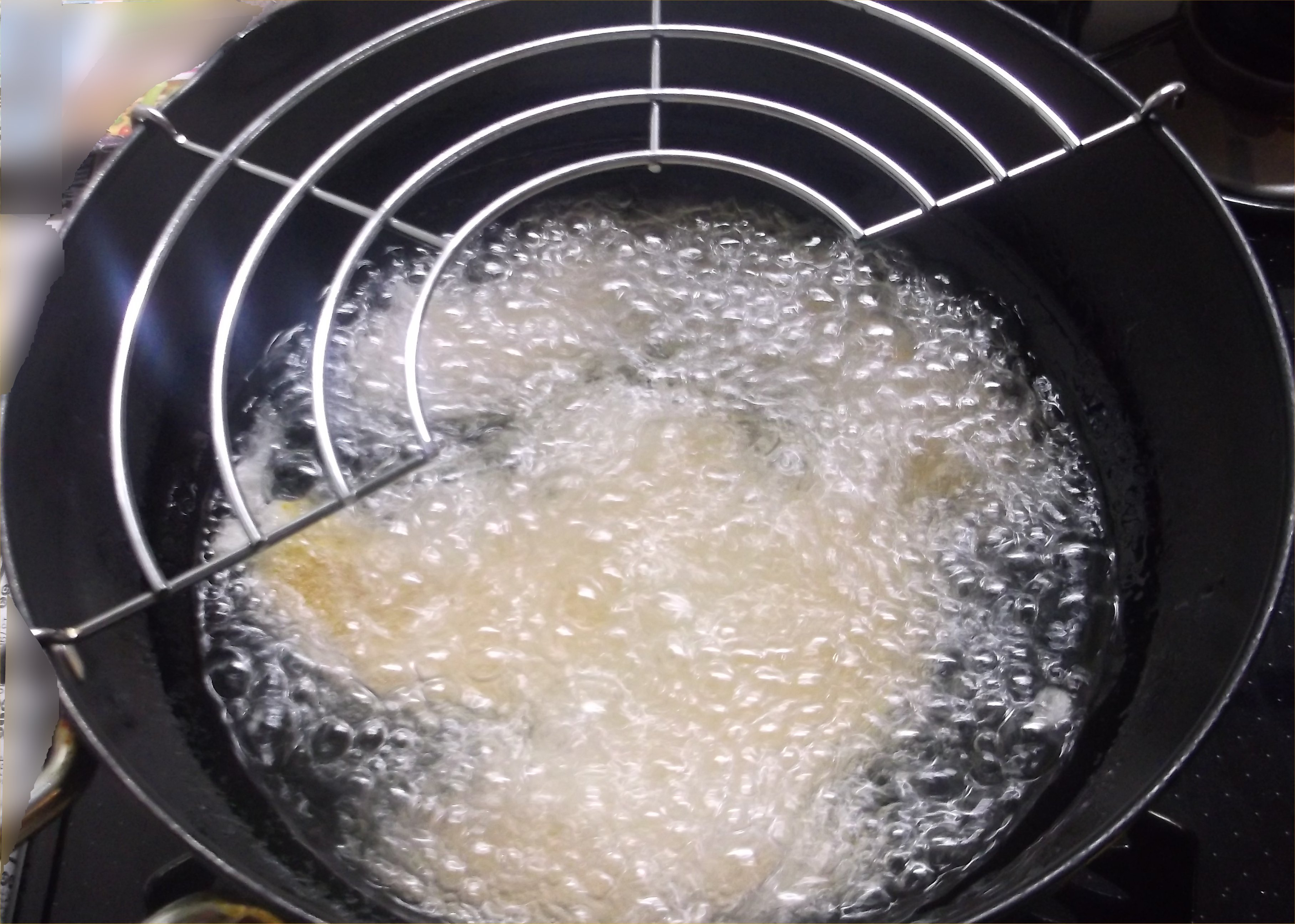
Frying tempura

Thin slices or strips of vegetables or seafood are dipped in the batter, then briefly deep-fried in hot oil. Vegetable oil or canola oil are most common; however, tempura was traditionally cooked using sesame oil. Many specialty shops still use sesame oil or tea seed oil, and it is thought certain compounds in these oils help to produce light, crispier batter.

The finished fry is pale whiteish, thin and fluffy, yet crunchy.

The bits of batter (known as tenkasu) are scooped out between batches of tempura so they do not burn and leave a bad flavor in the oil. A small mesh scoop (ami jakushi) is used for this purpose. Tenkasu are often reserved as ingredients in other dishes or as a topping.

=== Ingredients ===
Various seafood and vegetables are commonly used as the ingredients in traditional tempura.

==== Seafood ====
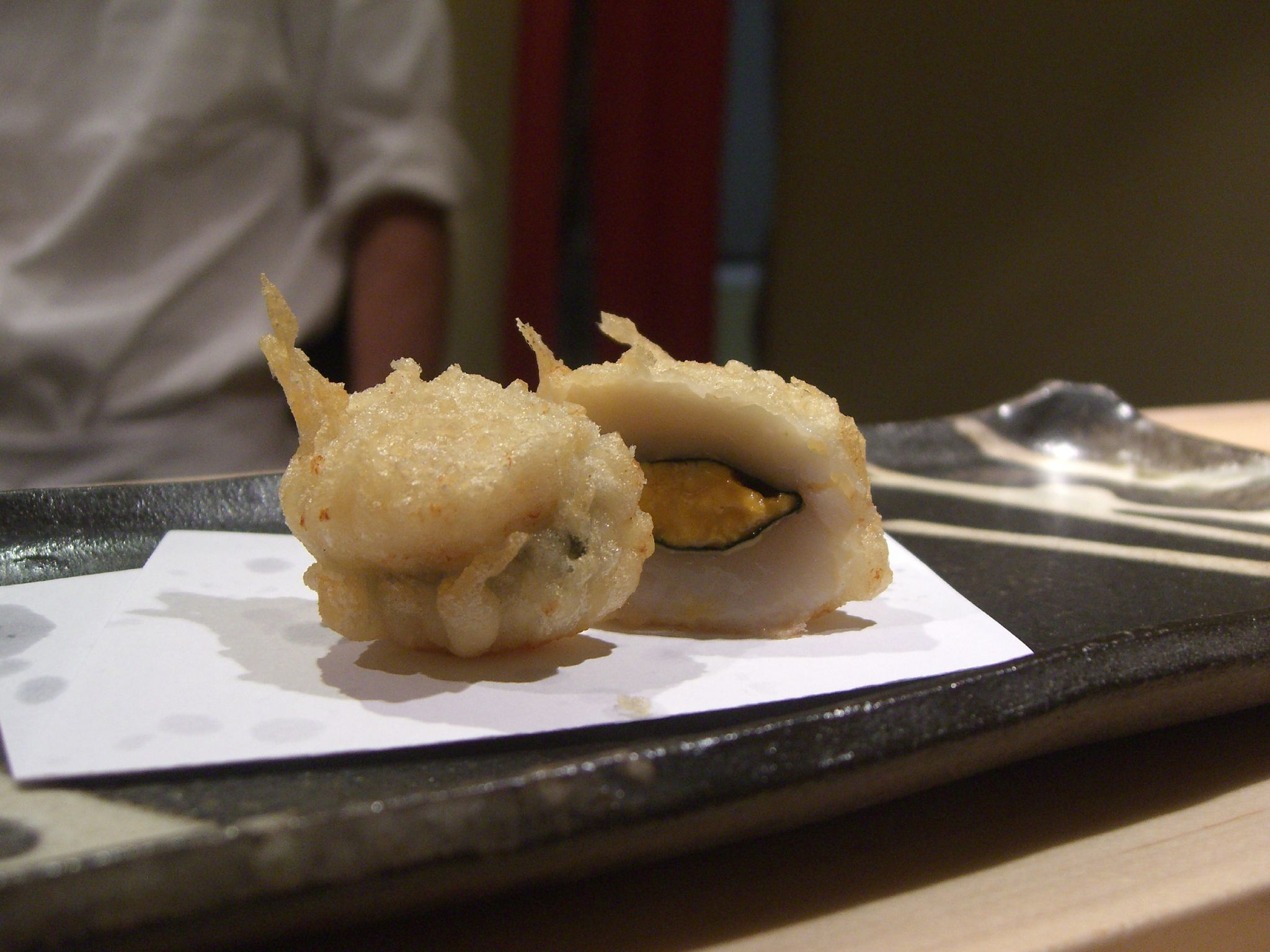
Scallop tempura with sea urchin roe

Types of seafood used in tempura include:

- prawn – ebi tempura
- shrimp
- squid
- scallop
- crab
- ayu (sweetfish)
- anago (conger eel)
- fish
- catfish
- white fish
- cod
- haddock
- pollock
- coley
- plaice
- skate
- ray
- Huss (Various fish species including Galeorhinus, Mustelus, Scyliorhinus, Galeus melastomus, Squalus acanthias – also known as spiny dogfish or "rock salmon")
- rock salmon (a term covering several species of dogfish and similar fish)
- whiting
- Japanese whiting – kisu
- sea bass
- sea perch

==== Vegetables ====
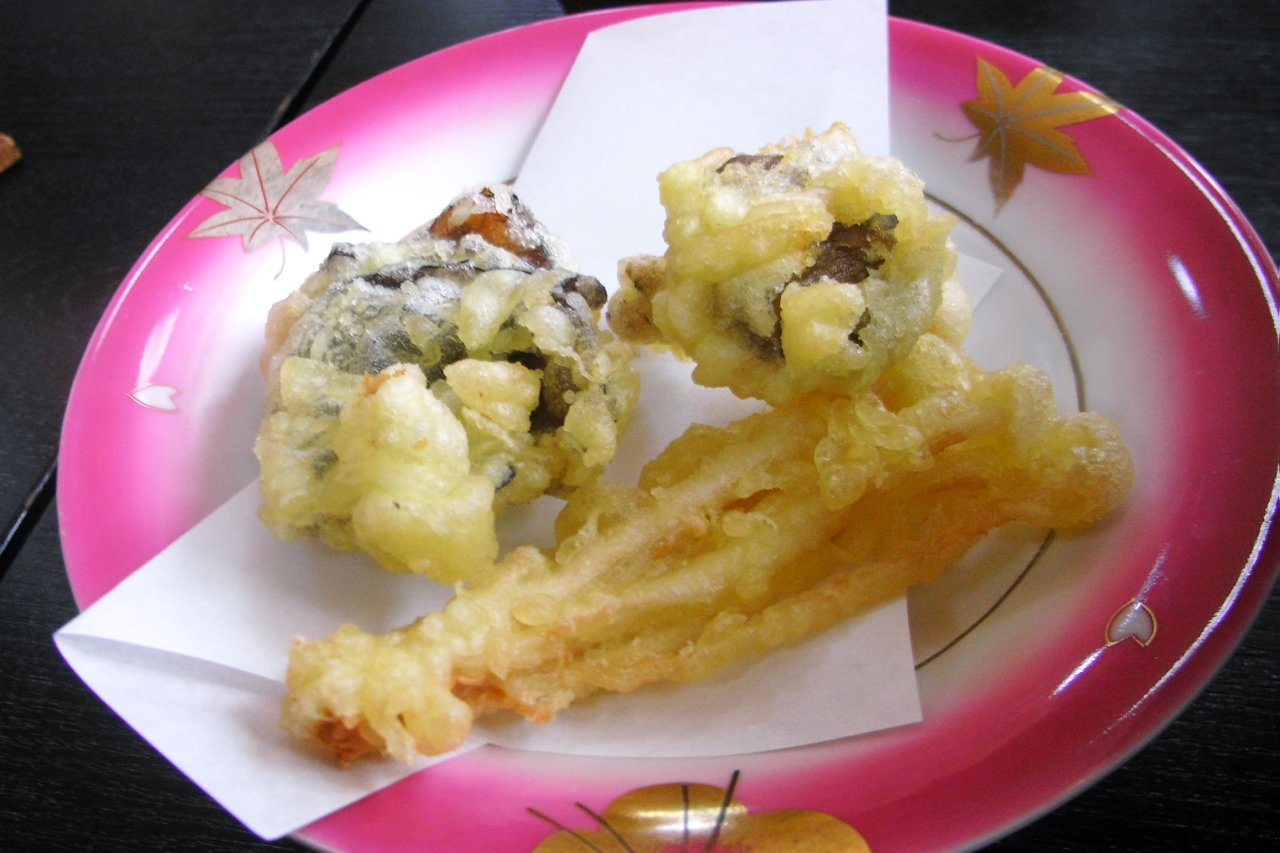
Mushroom tempura

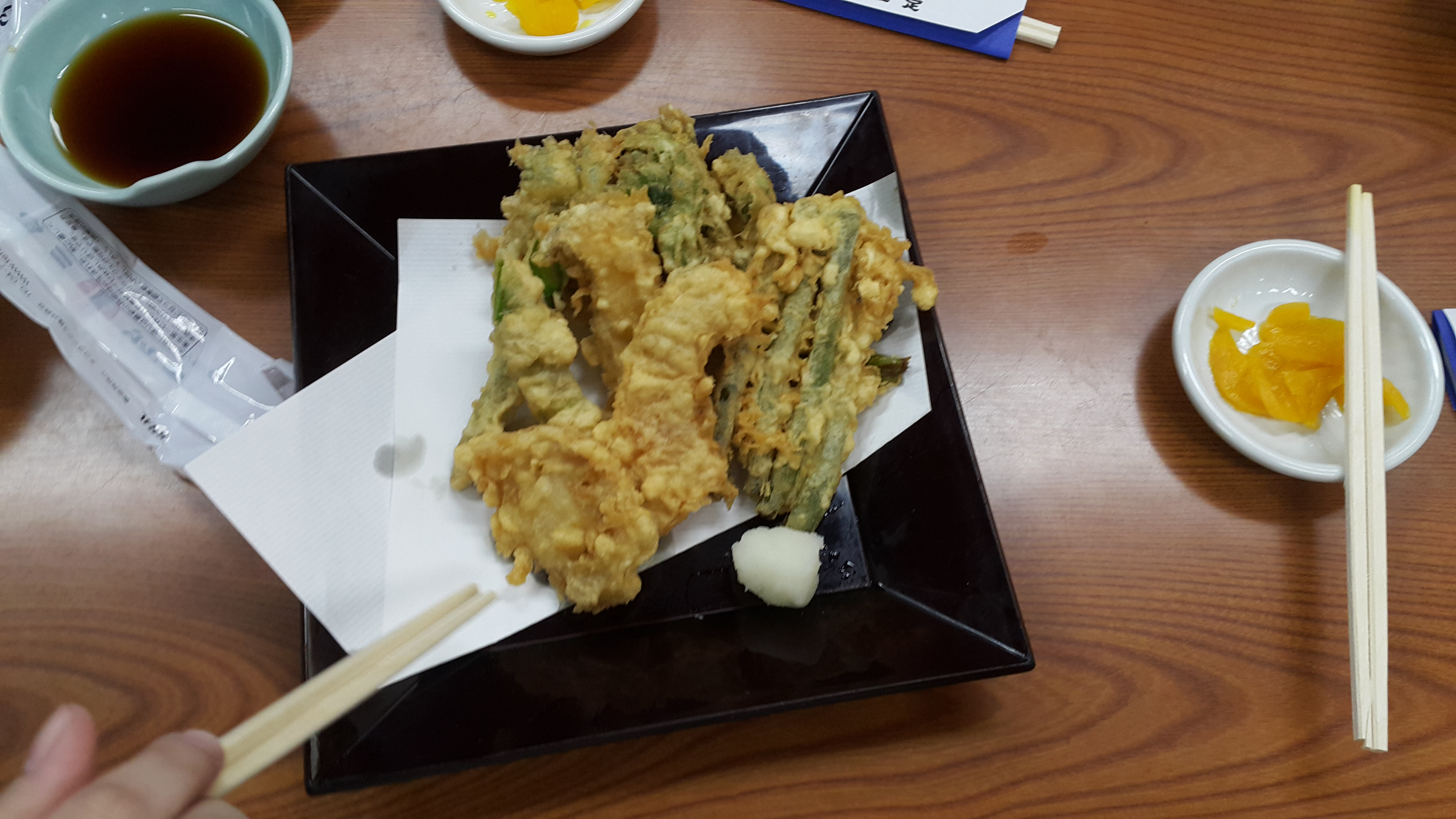
Assorted vegetable tempura served at San-Sada restaurant in Asakusa, Tokyo, Japan

Vegetable tempura is called yasai tempura. All-vegetable tempura may be served as a vegetarian dish. Types of vegetables include:

- bamboo shoots
- bell pepper
- broccoli
- butternut squash
- carrot
- maize
- eggplant
- gobo (burdock, Arctium lappa)
- ginger
- green beans
- kabocha squash
- Japanese mugwort
- mushrooms
  - maitake mushroom
  - shiitake mushroom
- okra
- onion
- pumpkin
- potato
- renkon (lotus root)
- seaweed
- shishito pepper
- shiso leaf
- sweet potato
- yam

==== Others ====
- egg
- kakiage

=== Serving and presentation ===
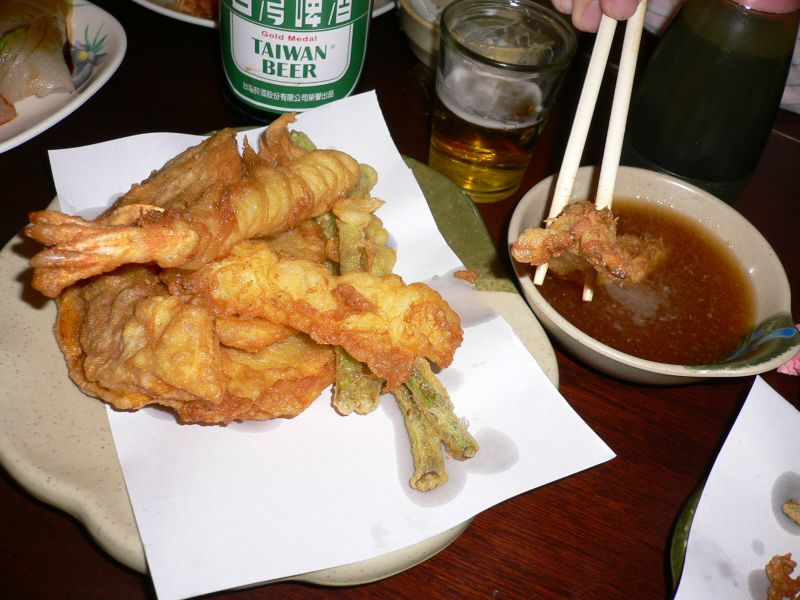
Tentsuyu is the most common sauce consumed with tempura.

Cooked pieces of tempura are either eaten with dipping sauce, salted without sauce, or used to assemble other dishes. Tempura is commonly served with grated daikon and eaten hot immediately after frying. In Japan, it is often found in bowls of soba or udon soup in the form of shrimp, shiso leaf, or fritter. The most common sauce is tentsuyu sauce (roughly three parts dashi, one part mirin, and one part shōyu). Alternatively, skim tempura may be sprinkled with sea salt before eating. Mixtures of powdered green tea and salt or yuzu and salt are also used. Kakiage is a type of tempura made with mixed vegetable strips, such as onion, carrot, and burdock, and sometimes including shrimp or squid, which are deep fried as small round fritters.

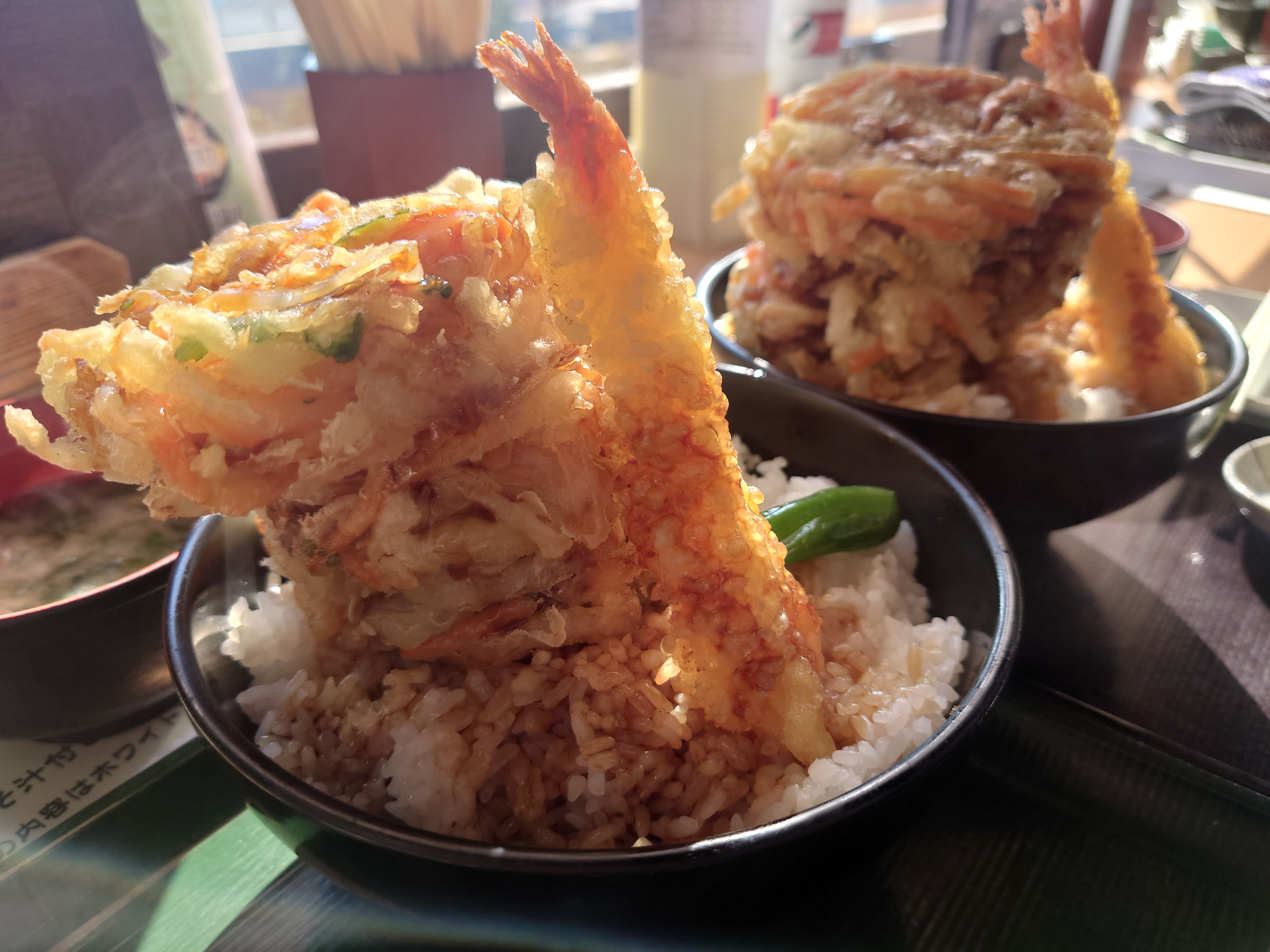
A tower-shaped kakiage bowl (temdon), a specialty of Ōarai, Ibaraki

Tempura is also used in combination with other foods. When served over soba (buckwheat noodles), it is called tempura soba or tensoba. Tempura is also served as a donburi dish where tempura shrimp and vegetables are served over steamed rice in a bowl (tendon) and on top of udon soup (tempura udon).

== History ==
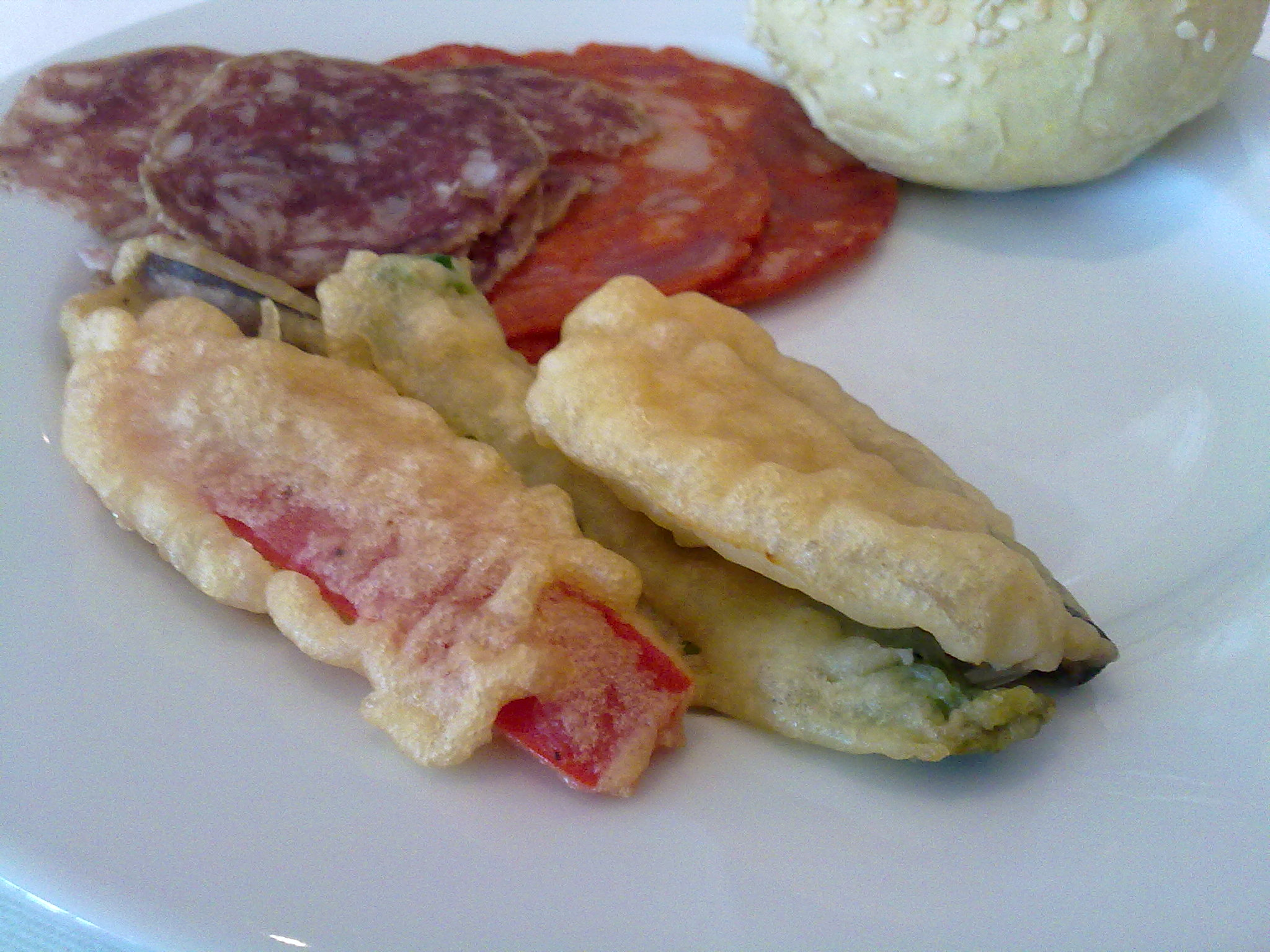
Peixinhos da horta ("little fishes from the garden"), the Portuguese ancestor of Japanese tempura

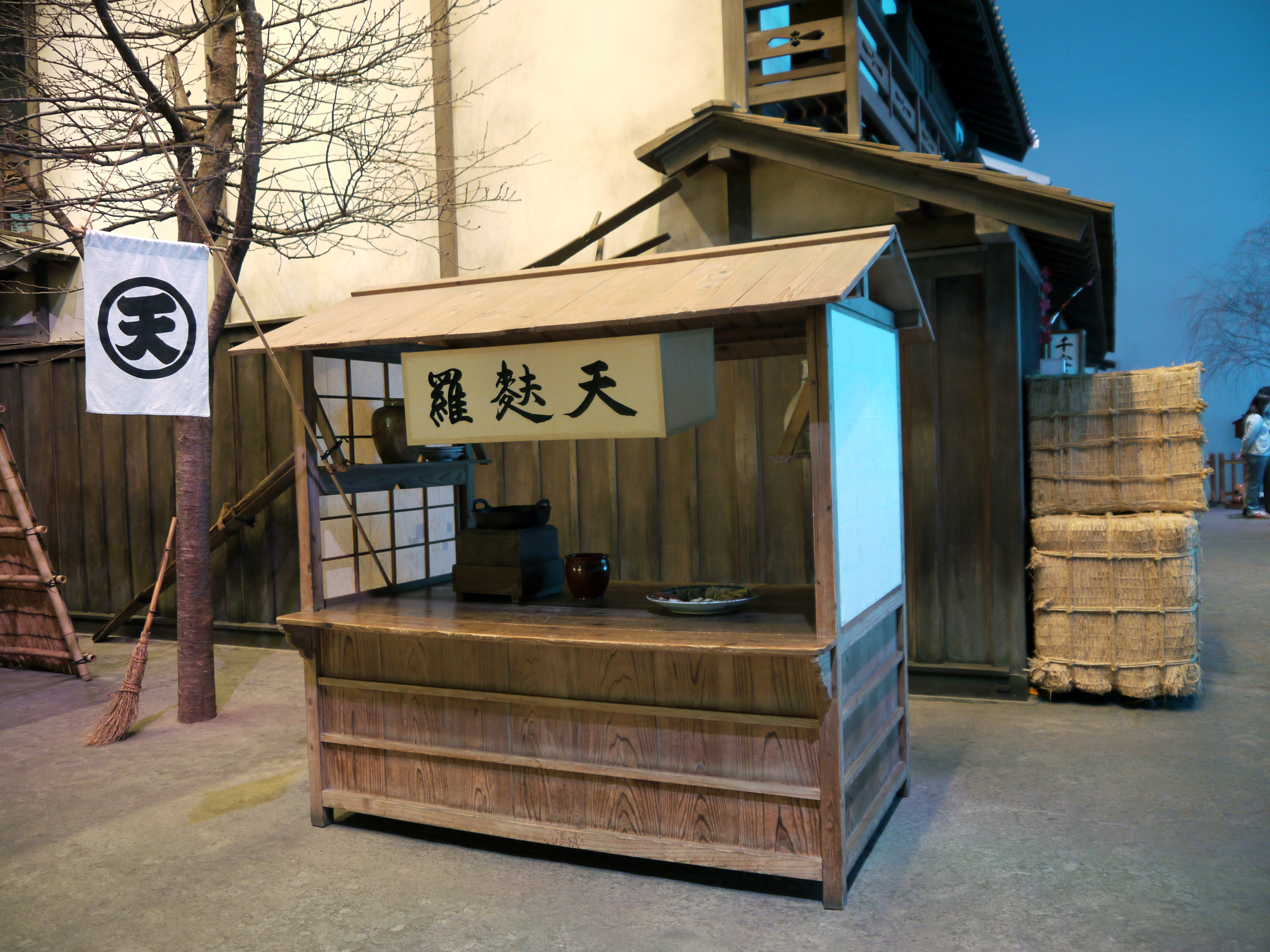
Tempura yatai (stall) of Edo period

=== Origins ===
Earlier Japanese deep-fried food was either simply fried without breading or batter or fried with rice flour. However, toward the end of the 16th century, the technique of fritter-cooking with a batter of flour and eggs was acquired in Nagasaki from Portuguese missionaries. Peixinhos da horta was a dish often eaten during Lent or Ember days to fulfill the fasting and abstinence rules for Catholics. The word "tempura" originates from the Latin word tempora, a term referring to these fasting times (Spanish: Témporas). In those days, the ingredients were covered in thick batter containing flour, sugar and sake, and then fried in lard. As the batter already contained seasoning, it was eaten without dipping sauce.

In the early 17th century, around the Tokyo Bay area, tempura ingredients and preparation changed as the yatai (food cart) culture gained popularity. Making the best use of fresh seafood while preserving its delicate taste, tempura used only flour, eggs, and water as ingredients, and the batter was not flavored. As the batter was mixed minimally in cold water, it avoided the dough-like stickiness caused by the activation of wheat gluten, resulting in the crispy texture now characteristic of tempura. It became customary to dip tempura quickly in a sauce mixed with grated daikon just before eating it.

Today in Japan, mainstream tempura recipes originate from "Tokyo-style" (also known as “Edo-style“) tempura, invented at the food stalls along the riverside fish market in the Edo period. Tempura became popular largely due to the abundance of seafood. In addition, as oil extraction techniques advanced, cooking oil became cheaper. Serving deep-fried food indoors was prohibited during Edo because tempura oil was a fire hazard in Japanese buildings, which were made of paper and wood. Therefore, tempura gained popularity as fast food eaten at outdoor food stalls. It was skewered and eaten with a dipping sauce. Tempura is considered one of "the Edo Delicacies" along with soba (buckwheat noodles) and sushi, which were also food stall take-outs.

The modern tempura recipe was first published in 1671 in the cookbook called "料理献立抄". After the Meiji period, tempura was no longer considered a fast-food item but developed as a high-class cuisine.

=== Etymology ===
The word "tempura", or the technique of dipping fish and vegetables into a batter and frying them, comes from the word tempora, a Latin word meaning "times", "time period" used by Portuguese missionaries to refer to the Lenten period or Ember Days (ad tempora quadragesima), Fridays, and other Christian holy days. Ember Days, or quatuor anni tempora in Latin, refer to holy days when Catholics avoid meat and eat fish or vegetables instead. The idea that the word "tempura" may have been derived from the Portuguese noun tempero, meaning a condiment or seasoning of any kind, or from the verb temperar, meaning "to season" is also possible as the Japanese language could easily have assumed the word tempero as is, without changing any vowels as the Portuguese pronunciation, in this case, is similar to the Japanese. There is still today a dish in Portugal very similar to tempura called peixinhos da horta, "garden fishes", which consists of green beans dipped in a batter and fried.

The term "tempura" is thought to have gained popularity in southern Japan; it became widely used to refer to any food prepared using hot oil, including some already existing Japanese foods. Today, particularly in western Japan, the word "tempura" is also commonly used to refer to satsuma-age, fried surimi fish cake which is made without batter.

== Variations ==
=== Japan ===
In Japan, restaurants specializing in tempura are called tenpura-ya. Many restaurants offer tempura as part of a set meal or a bento (lunch box), and it is also a popular ingredient in take-out or convenience store bento boxes. The ingredients and styles of cooking and serving tempura vary greatly throughout the country, with importance placed on using fresh, seasonal ingredients.

=== Outside Japan ===
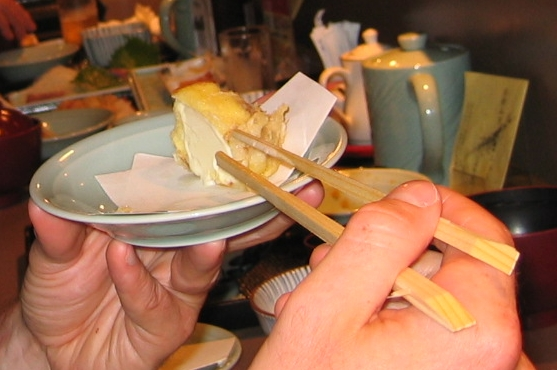
Tempura ice cream

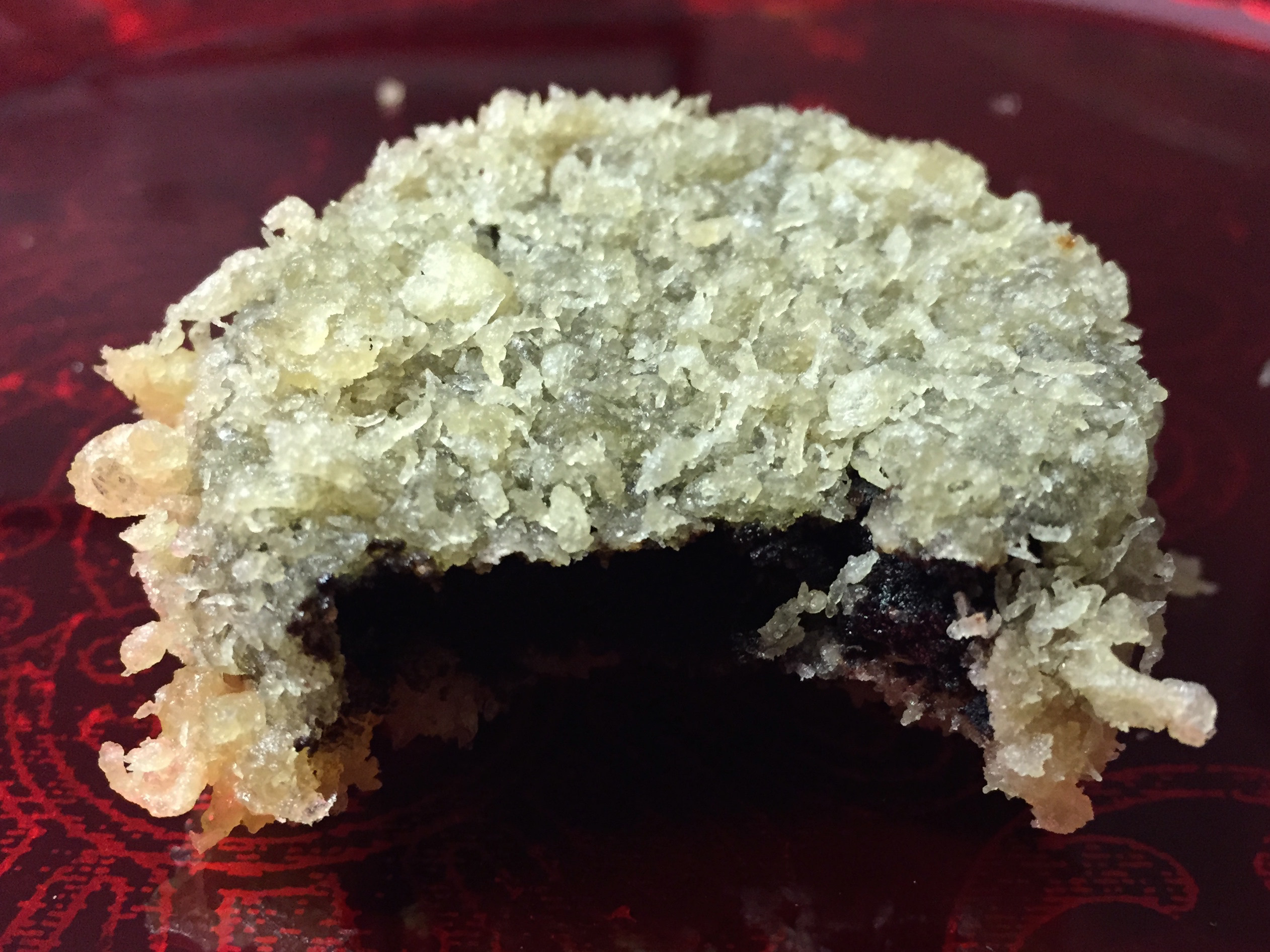
Chocolate cookie tempura

Outside Japan (as well as recently in Japan), there are many nontraditional and fusion uses of tempura. Chefs all over the world include tempura dishes on their menus, and a wide variety of different batters and ingredients are used, including nontraditional broccoli, zucchini, asparagus and chuchu. More unusual ingredients may include nori slices, dry fruit such as bananas, and ice cream (tempura-based fried ice cream). American restaurants are known to serve tempura in the form of various types of meat, particularly chicken and cheeses, usually mozzarella. A variation is to use panko (breadcrumbs), which results in a crisper consistency than tempura batter, although in Japan this would be classified as a furai dish. Tempura (particularly shrimp) is often used as a filling in makizushi. A more recent variation of tempura sushi has entire pieces of sushi dipped in batter and tempura-fried.

In Bangladesh, the blossoms of pumpkins or marrows are often deep-fried with a gram of rice flour spice mix, creating a Bengali-style tempura known as kumro ful bhaja.

==== Taiwan ====
In Taiwan, tempura, as described in the preceding, is known as tiānfùluó (天婦羅) and can commonly be found on the menu in Japanese restaurants all over the island. A similar-sounding dish, tianbula (Chinese: 甜不辣; pinyin: tiánbùlà; lit. 'sweet', 'not spicy') is usually sold at night markets. Tianbula is Japanese satsuma-age and was introduced to Taiwan under Japanese rule by people from Kyushu, where satsuma-age is commonly known as tempura.

== See also ==
- Glossary of Japanese words of Portuguese origin
- List of Japanese dishes § Deep-fried dishes (agemono, 揚げ物)
  - Ebi furai: a Japanese dish of breaded and deep-fried shrimp.
  - Karaage: a Japanese cooking technique in which various foods – most often chicken, but other meat and fish – are coated with flour and deep-fried in oil.
  - Kushikatsu: a Japanese dish of breaded and deep-fried skewered meat and vegetables.
  - Tonkatsu: Japanese breaded and deep-fried pork cutlet.
  - Toriten: a Japanese fritter of marinated chicken.
  - Karakudamono: a Japanese term used to collectively describe assorted pastry confections of Chinese origin (also called togashi).
- Unbreaded fritters:
  - Crispy kangkóng: Filipino deep-fried water spinach leaves in batter.
  - Pakora: a South Asian food resembling tempura.
  - Okoy: Filipino shrimp fritters.
  - Camaron rebosado: Filipino deep-fried battered shrimp.
  - Gambas con gabardina: Spanish deep-fried battered shrimp.
