= Peixinhos da horta =

Portuguese fried vegetable-based dish

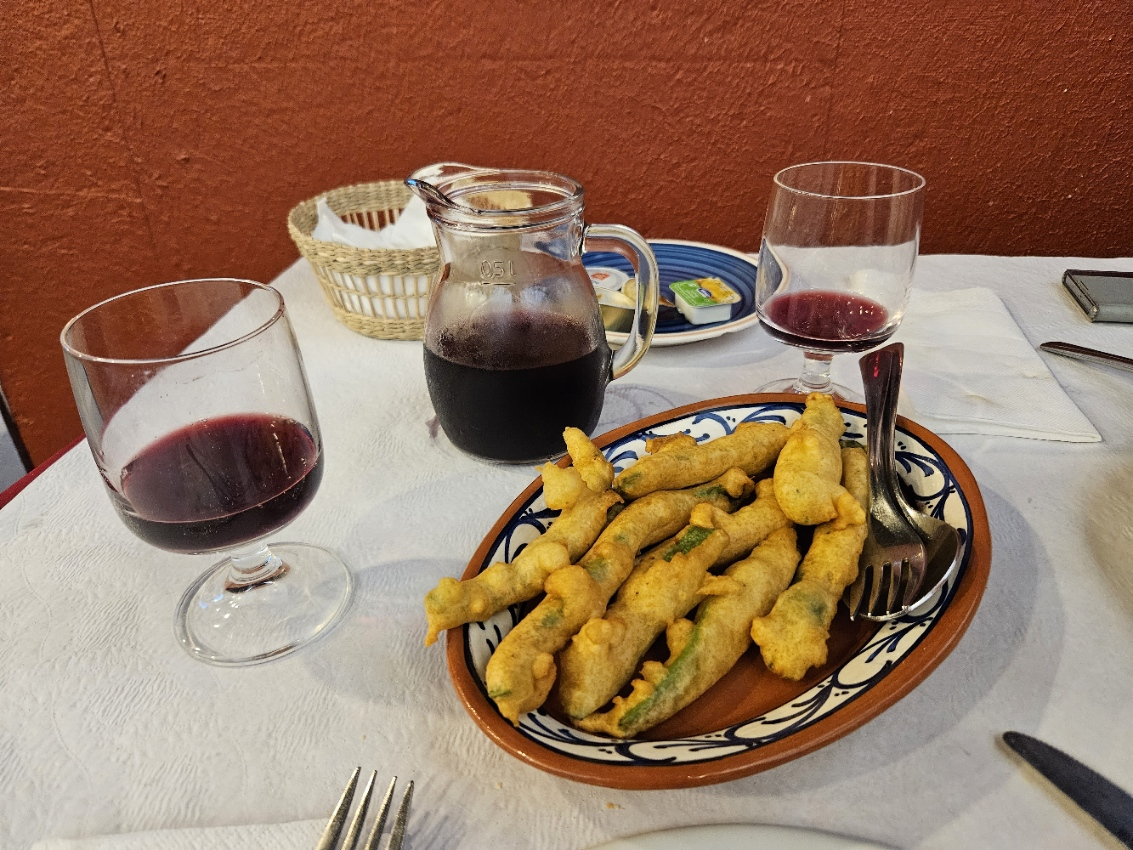
A plate of peixinhos da horta in Santarém, Portugal

Peixinhos da horta ([pɐjˈʃĩɲuʒ ðɐ ˈɔɾtɐ]) is a traditional dish in Portuguese cuisine. The name of the dish is literally translated as "little fish from the vegetable garden", as it resembles small pieces of colorful fish. It was introduced to Japan by Portuguese sailors Antonio da Mota and Francisco Zeimoto in the sixteenth century. The dish later gave rise to tempura, a typical Japanese dish.

== Preparation ==
Peixinhos da horta is usually prepared with green beans in a wheat-flour-based batter that are then deep-fried. Other vegetables such as bell peppers and squash are also used.
