= Toriten =

Japanese fried chicken dish

Toriten
Origin	Ōita Prefecture, Japan

Toriten is a Japanese tempura style fried chicken. It originated food in Ōita Prefecture, and is very popular there. Any part of the chicken can be used. The meat is cut into small pieces, dipped in soy sauce, sake and garlic powder, rolled in tempura powder and deep fried. Toriten is commonly served with fresh greens, and eaten hot immediately after frying. The most common sauce is Ponzu sauce (made with soy sauce and vinegar) with mustard. In Oita, it is also popular to eat with a Kabosu-based sauce.

According to the Oita City website, Toriten was invented by a restaurant in Oita City. However, there is another opinion that TOYO-KEN, a restaurant in Beppu City, first created toriten.
