= Hiyayakko =

Japanese tofu dish

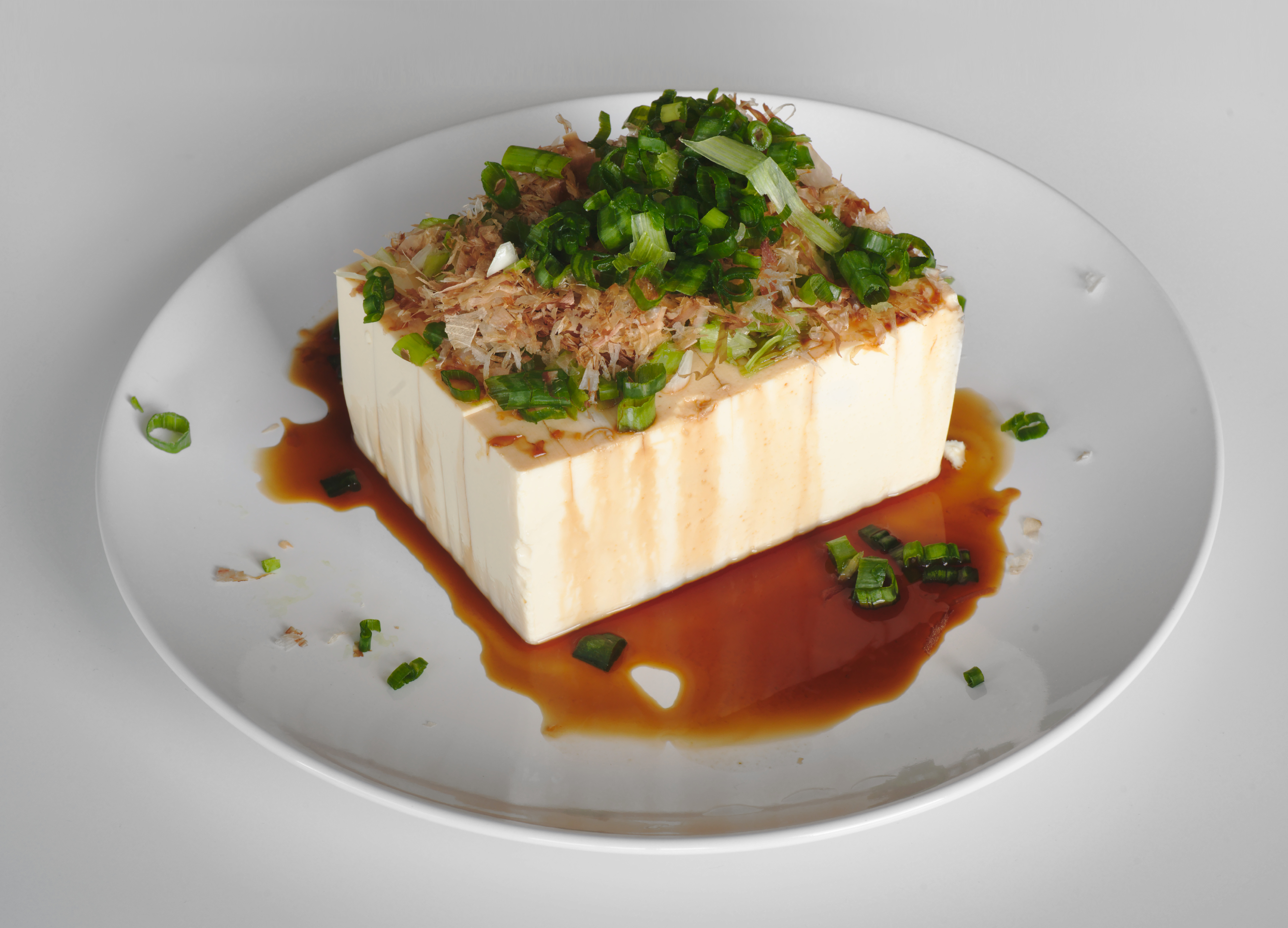
- Standard hiyayakko with chopped negi onion, katsuobushi and soy sauce
- Course: Main
- Place of origin: Japan
- Main ingredients: Tofu, katsuobushi, soy sauce, negi, shiso, daikon, myoga

Hiyayakko (冷奴; "cold tofu") is a Japanese dish made with chilled tofu and toppings.

== Variety of toppings ==
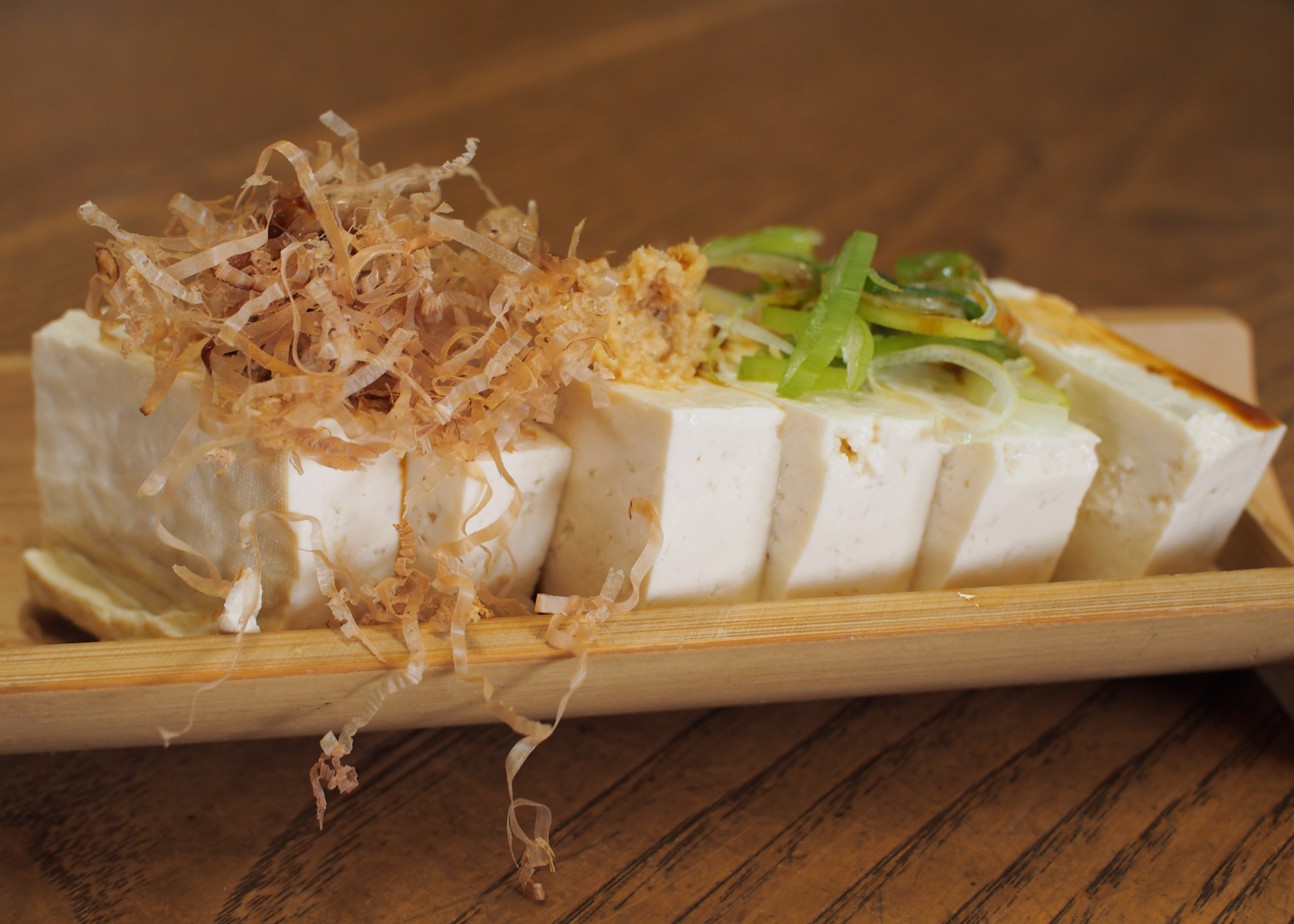
Hiyayakko topped with katsuobushi, grated ginger and chopped green onion

The choice of toppings on the tofu vary among households and restaurants, but a standard combination is chopped green onion with katsuobushi (dried skipjack tuna flakes) and soy sauce. Other toppings include:

- Shiso leaf
- Yuzu rind
- Daikon radish
- Sliced myoga ginger
- Grated ginger
- Sliced okra
- Plum paste

== History and background ==
Hiyayakko is also known as hiyakko or yakko-dōfu. Hiya means cold, and yakko refers to the servants of samurai during the Edo period in Japan. They wore a vest on which the "nail-puller crest" was attached, on the shoulders; therefore, cutting something (e.g. tofu) into cubes was called "cutting into yakko" (奴に切る, yakko ni kiru). "Hiyakkoi" or "hyakkoi", the Tokyo dialectal term equivalent to the standard Japanese "hiyayaka" (冷ややか), is also a possible etymology.

In the 1782 recipe book Tofu Hyakuchin, it is said that hiyayakko is so well known that it needs no introduction.

In haiku, hiyayakko is a season word for summer. This is because tofu is often enjoyed cold in the summer, warm and boiled in a broth in the winter.

== Gallery ==
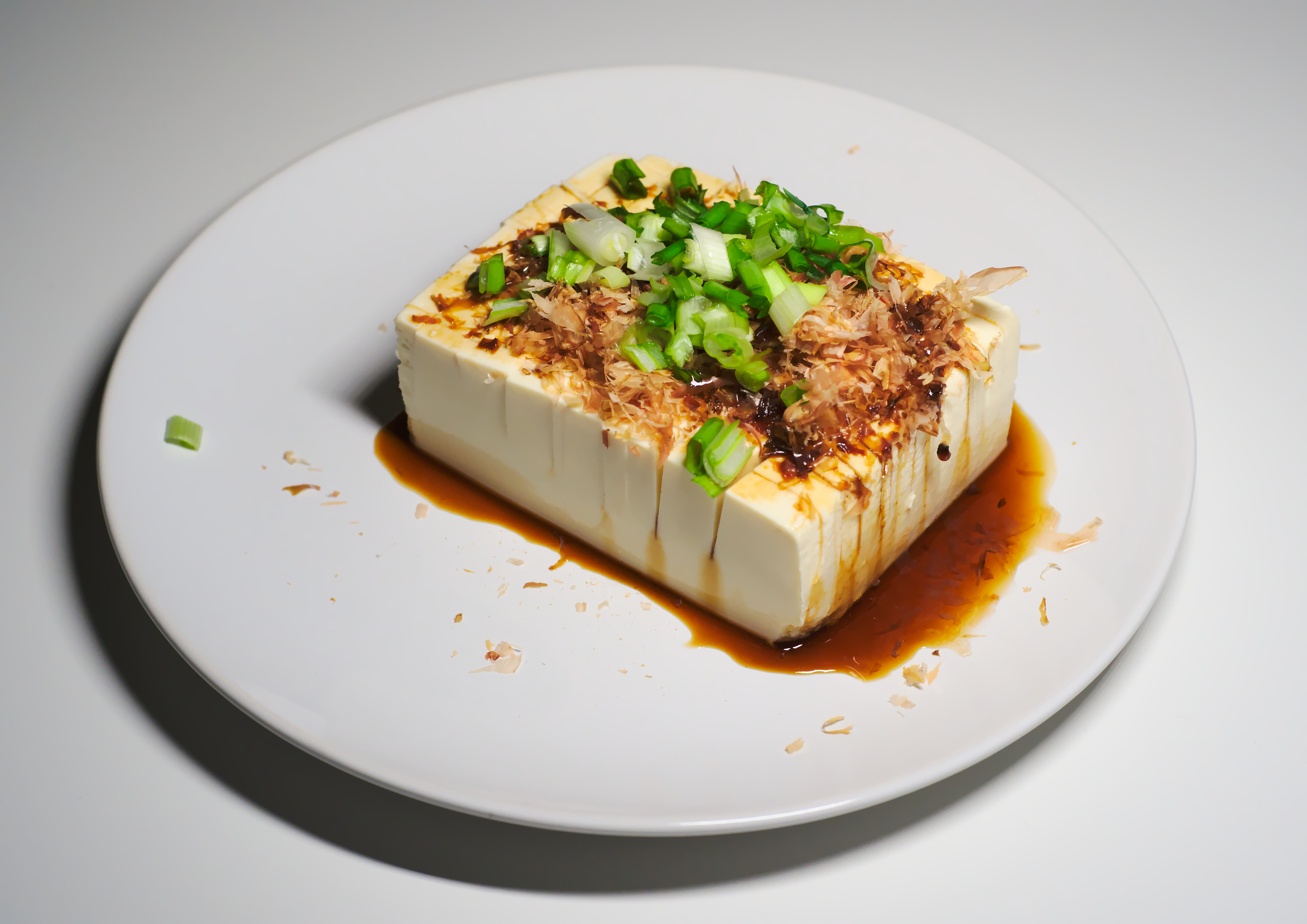

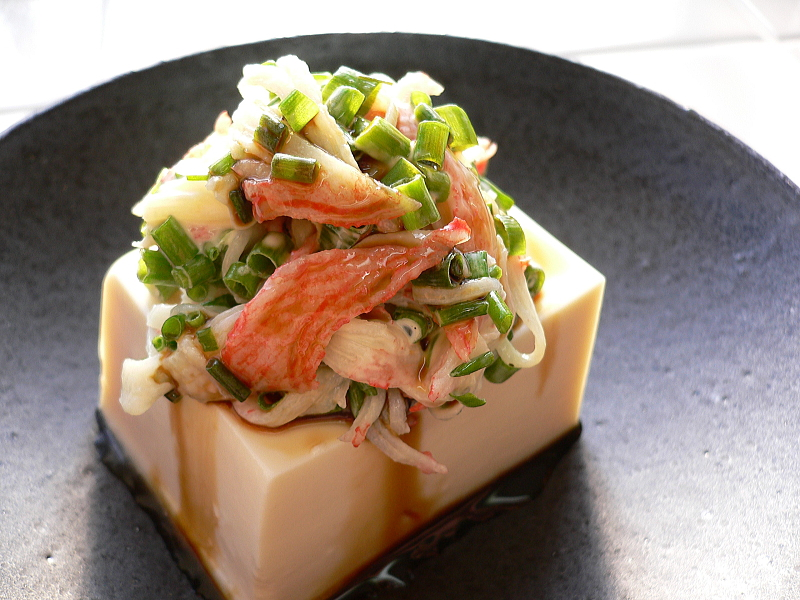
With crab kamaboko

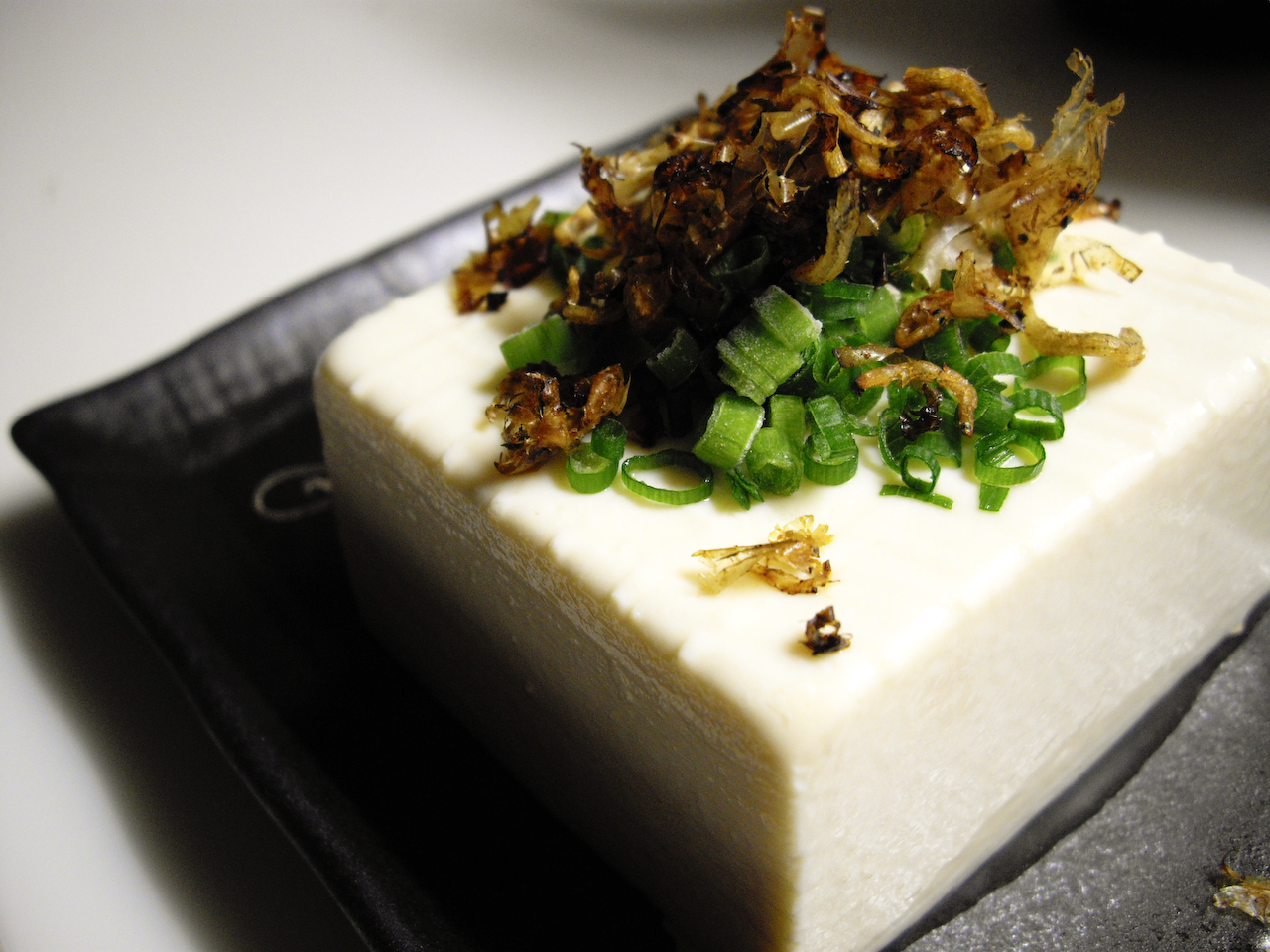
With shirasu

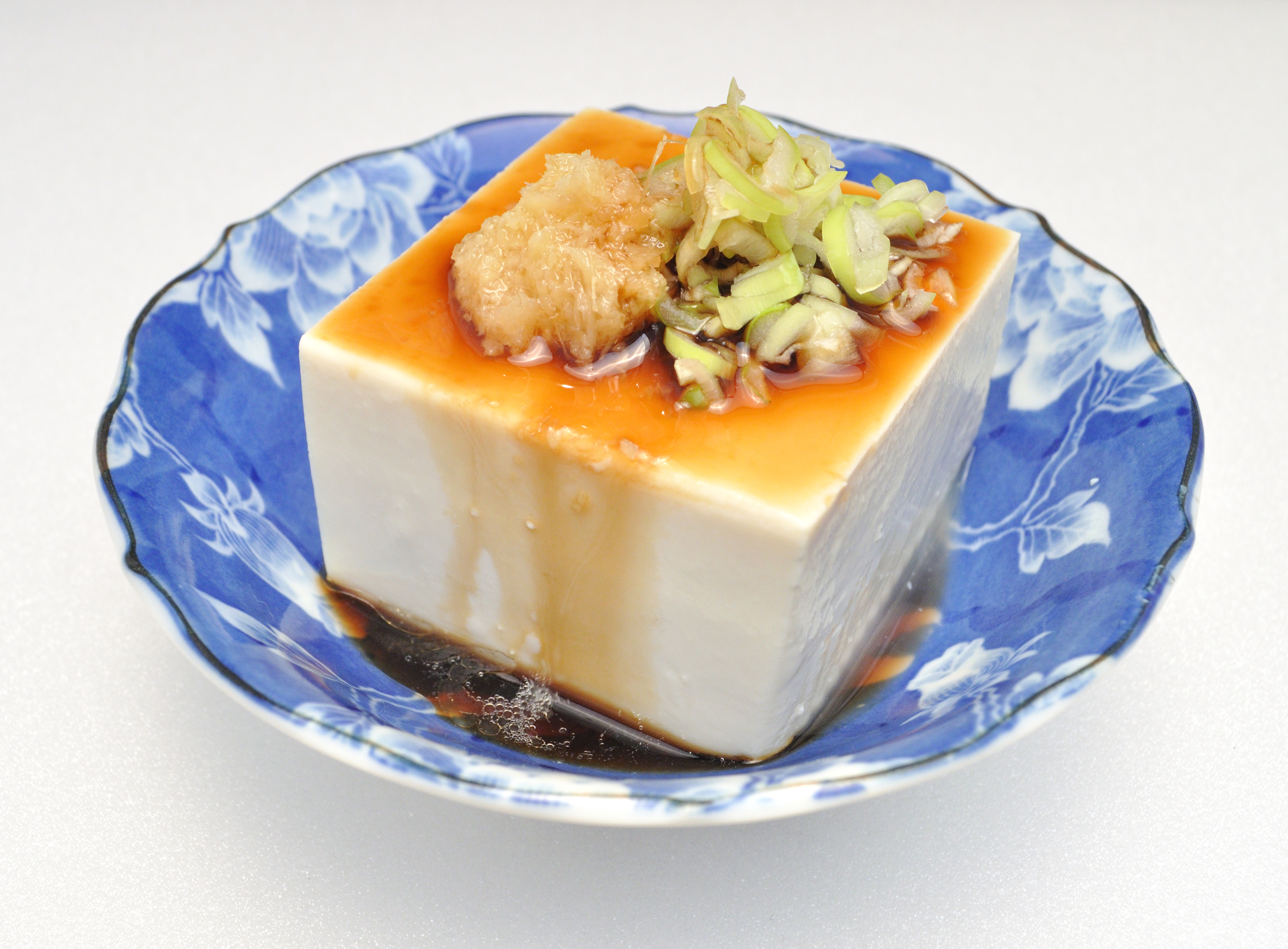
With negi and grated ginger

The nail-puller crest (釘抜紋, Kuginuki mon)

== See also ==
- List of tofu dishes
