= Gambas con gabardina =

Spanish tapa

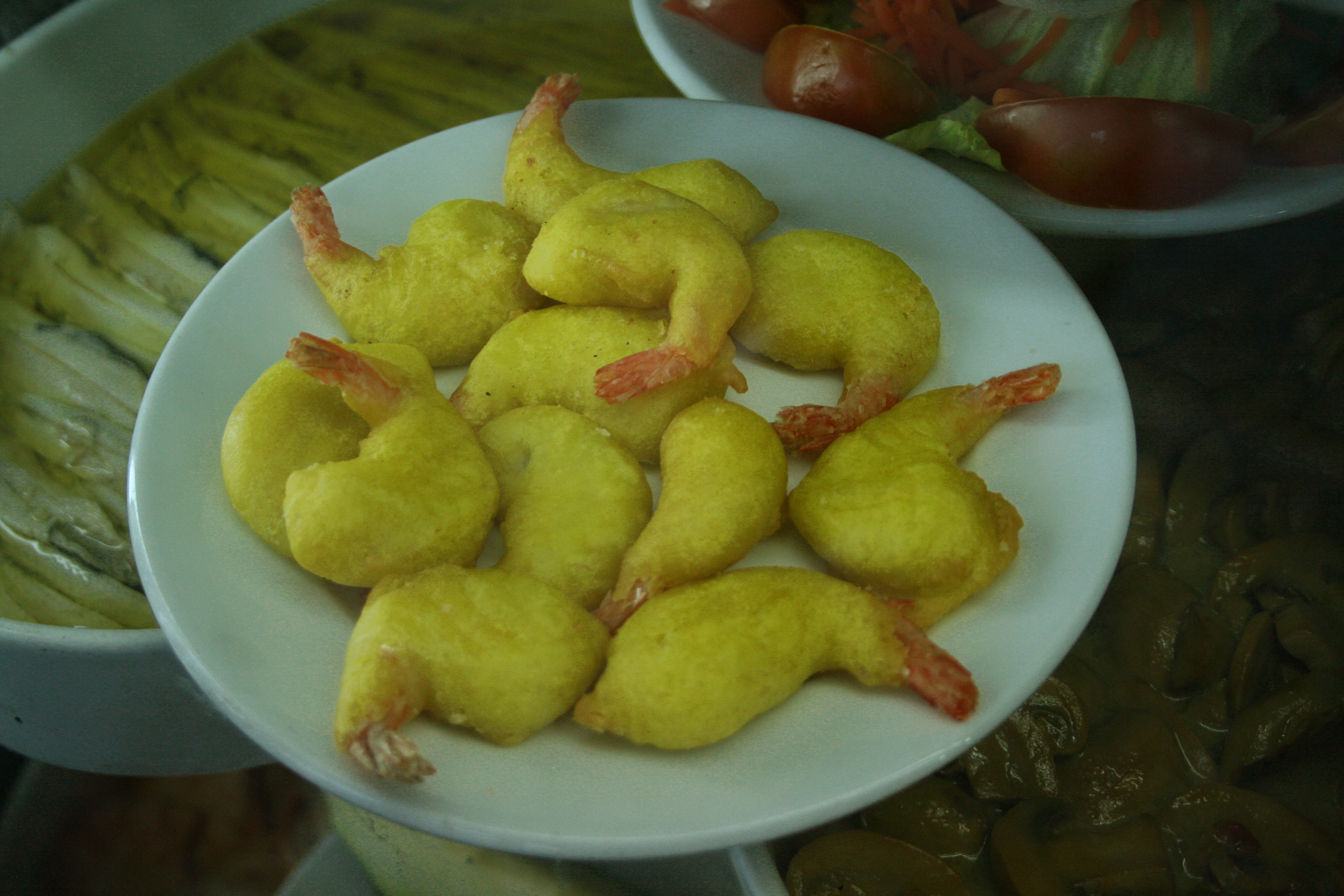
- The dish before being cooked
- Course: Appetizer
- Place of origin: Spain
- Main ingredients: Shrimp, batter (flour, egg, beer and cornstarch)

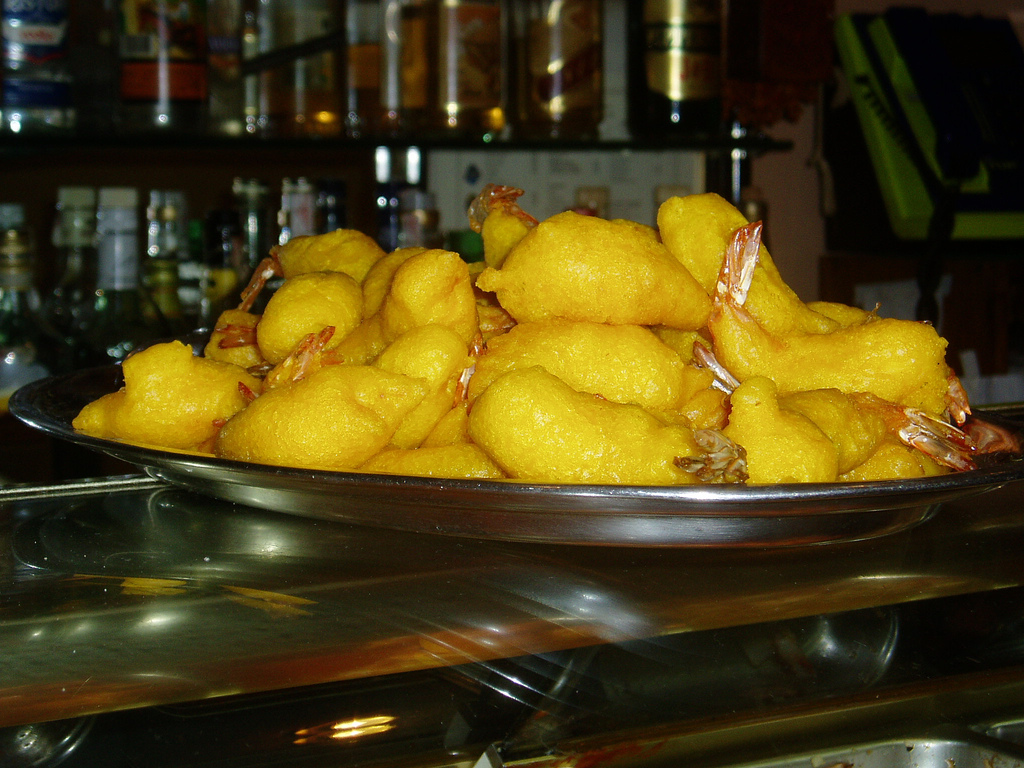
A serving of gambas con gabardina as eaten in Spanish bars

Gambas con gabardina (shrimp in a trenchcoat) is a popular Spanish tapa that started to gain prominence in the 1950s, when it was included in the Manual de Cocina, a cookbook published by the Sección Femenina and given to all Spanish housewives after they completed their Social Service, the female equivalent to conscription during the Francoist dictatorship. It consists of shrimp coated in a flour, egg, beer and cornstarch batter (known in French as à l'Orly) and then deep fried in olive oil. The tails are left during cooking as the shrimp is eaten by hand. The batter may have a yellow tint due to the use of saffron. The name of the dish comes from the way the batter covers the shrimp, as it does so in the fashion of a trenchcoat. A variant popular in Murcia is known as caballitos (seahorses), as the peeled shrimp takes the shape of this fish through the use of a toothpick which is then used to eat the snack.
