= Tentsuyu =

Tempura dipping sauce

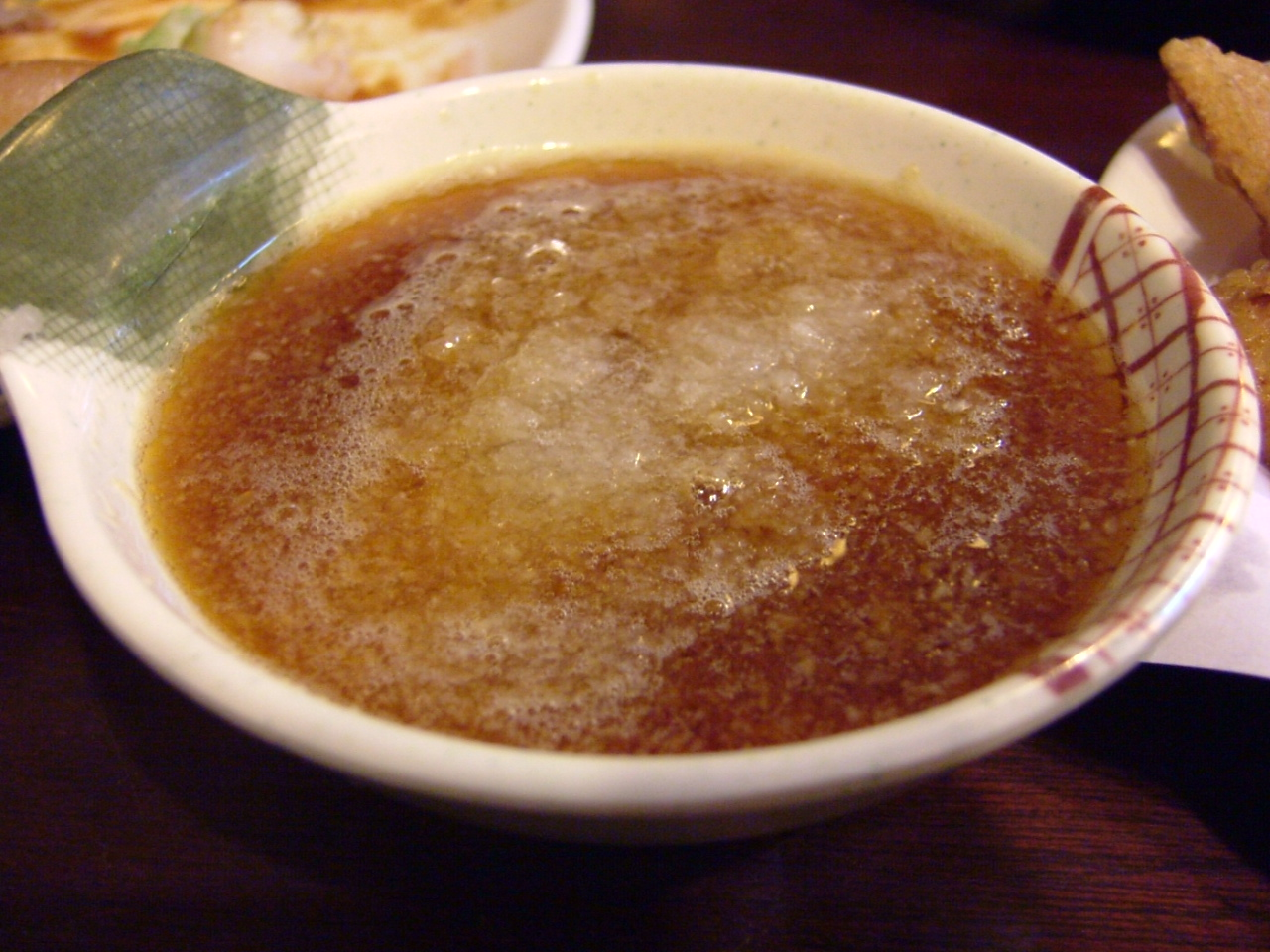
- Tentsuyu sauce
- Type: Tempura dip
- Place of origin: Japan
- Main ingredients: Dashi, mirin, and soy sauce

Tentsuyu (Japanese: てんつゆ/天汁) is Japanese tempura dip.

The recipe for tentsuyu depends on the seasons and on the ingredients for which tentsuyu is being prepared. A general, all-purpose, tentsuyu might consist of three parts dashi, one part mirin, and one part soy sauce. For ingredients with strong odors or flavors, however, sake and sugar might be used instead of mirin, or more or less shōyu might be used.

Similar ingredients make up the simmering sauce for donburi and the broth for dishes like agedashi tofu (deep-fried tofu in broth) and soba (buckwheat noodles).

Tentsuyu in concentrated form is commonly sold in a small bottles in supermarkets and grocery stores throughout Japan—and also in Asian grocery stores in the US.

When used for tempura, tentsuyu is commonly served with grated daikon white radish.

== See also ==
- List of dips
