= Tofu Hyakuchin =

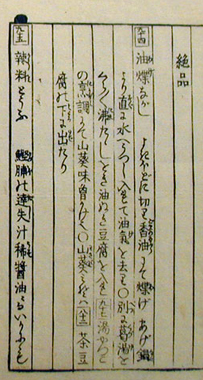
Page of section "Refined dishes" of the "Tofu hyakuchin"

The Tofu Hyakuchin (豆腐百珍, Tōfu Hyakuchin) is a Japanese recipe book published in 1782 during the Edo period. The author's name is given as Seikyōdōjin Kahitsujun (醒狂道人 何必醇); it is thought his real name was Sodani Gakusen (1738–1797), a seal-engraver from Osaka. It lists 100 recipes for preparing tofu. Due to its immense popularity, two successor volumes were published: Tōfu hyakuchin zokuhen (豆腐百珍続編) and Tōfu hyakuchin yōroku (豆腐百珍余録).
