= Katsu-sando =

Japanese sandwich

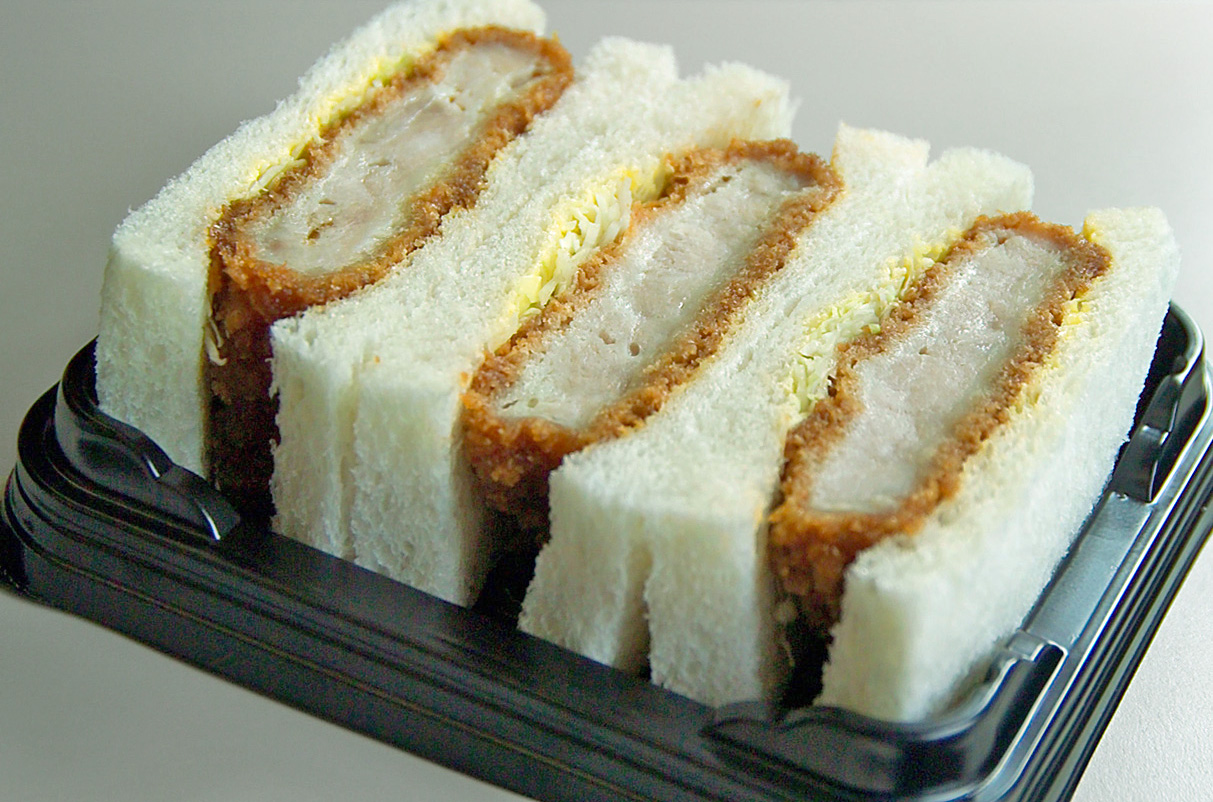
- Katsu-sando, or tonkatsu sandwich
- Type: Sandwich
- Place of origin: Japan
- Region or state: Tokyo
- Invented: 1935
- Main ingredients: Japanese milk bread; Tonkatsu

Katsu-sando (Japanese: カツサンド or かつサンド; lit. 'cutlet sandwich') is a Japanese sandwich which is made from Japanese-style cutlet (mainly tonkatsu) between slices of bread, and there are many variations.

The price and quantity of it are reasonable, so it is also served as a hassle-free snack or bento (e.g.,Tokyo Station's ekiben, Haneda Airport's soraben).

== History ==
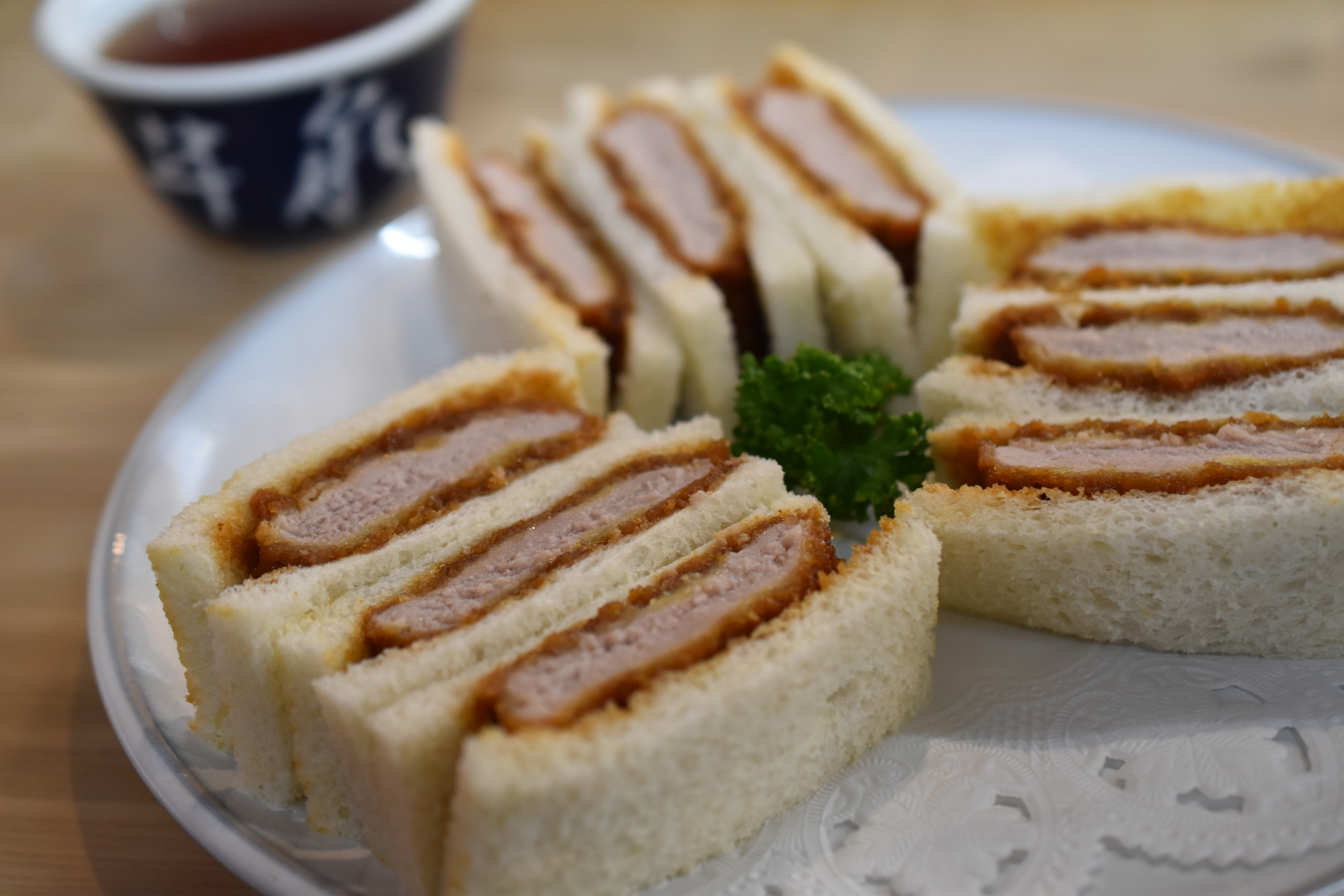
A katsu-sando from the restaurant Isen, where it was invented in 1935

Katsu-sando was invented in 1935 by Toki Ishizaka, the landlady of the tonkatsu restaurant "Isen" in Ueno, Tokyo. She was inspired by the ham sandwich, and officially called her creation "かつサンド" (not "カツサンド"). At the time of its invention, Isen was frequented by geishas of a hanamachi, so Isen made it with special ordered small breads to prevent their lipstick from coming off, and Isen was famous for its tender cutlet made with carefully pounded meat which could be cut with chopsticks.

== Manufacturing method ==
A typically katsu-sando made from tonkatsu between Japanese milk bread and served cut into rectangular or triangular pieces. Tonkatsu sauce is used as a seasoning, and sometimes karashi is also used. The bread may be toasted. Julienned cabbage is often placed on between slices of the bread along with tonkatsu.

In Tokyo, "hirekatsu-sando" (ヒレかつサンド; lit. 'pork fillet cutlet sandwich') of Maisen (a restaurant in Omotesandō) and "mankatsu-sando" (万かつサンド; lit. 'Mansei's cutlet sandwich') of Mansei (a restaurant in Akihabara) are well known, and these are sometimes featured as rokeben for television programs and movie shoots. "hirekatsu-sando" of Maisen made from pork fillet cutlet and "mankatsu-sando" of Mansei made from pork loin cutlet.

Katsu-sando is sometimes eaten the night before an important exam or competition like other Japanese cutlet dishes. This is because "katsu" is a homophone of the verb katsu (勝つ), meaning "to win" or "to be victorious".

== Types ==
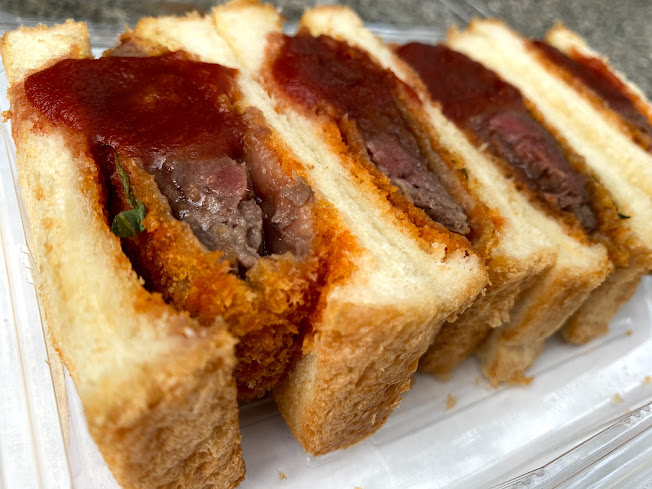
Gyūkatsu-sando, or beef cutlet sandwich

There are many types of katsu-sandos, including those which use bread other than Japanese milk bread, those which use cutlet other than tonkatsu such as gyū-katsu or chicken katsu, those which use different seasonings, and those which use vegetables, and there are also differences depending on the region.

In Aomori Prefecture, katsu-sando is known as a sandwich which made from chicken katsu between koppe pan.

In Nagoya and its suburbs, "misokatsu-sando" (味噌カツサンド; lit. 'miso cutlet sandwich') is sold in many places, and katsu-sando made with worcestershire sauce is sometimes called "sōsukatsu-sando" (ソースカツサンド; lit. 'sauce cutlet sandwich').

In the Kansai region, katsu-sando is often made with gyū-katsu, and it using tonkatsu is sometimes called "tonkatsu-sando" (豚カツサンド; lit. 'tonkatsu sandwich'). In addition, "aburamisokatsu-sando" (油味噌かつサンド; lit. 'andansū cutlet sandwich') which use andansū as a seasoning is also sold.

Katsu-sando made with round buns are also sold in hamburger restaurants in Japan, and in addition to tonkatsu, it also use chicken katsu, menchi-katsu, and ebi-katsu.

== See also ==
- Japanese cuisine
- List of sandwiches
