= Gyū-katsu =

Japanese dish of deep-fried beef

Gyū katsu
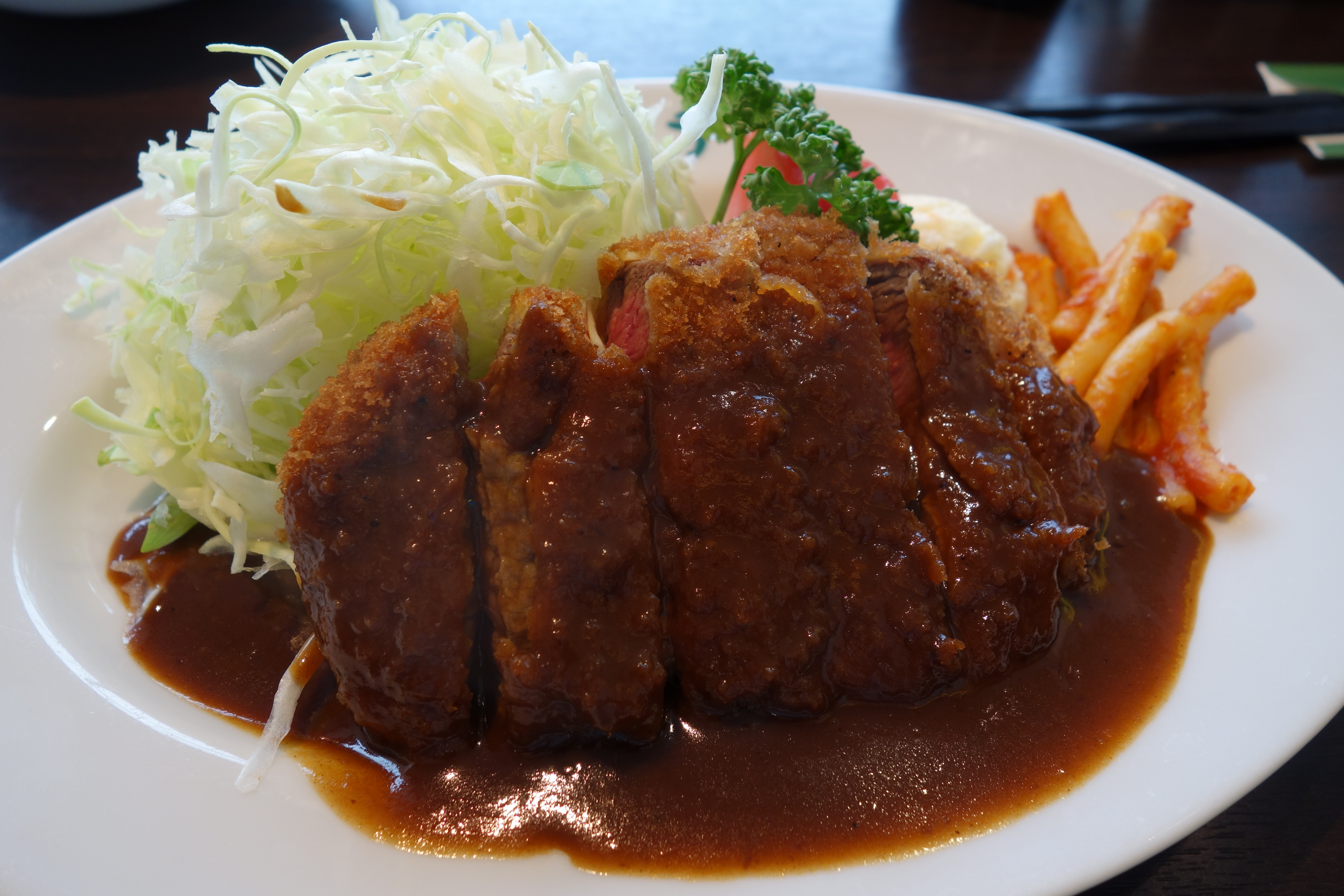
- Beef cutlet
- Place of origin: Japan
- Region or state: Kansai region
- Associated cuisine: Japanese cuisine
- Invented: Taishō era
- Main ingredients: Beef; Wheat flour; Chicken egg; Breadcrumbs; Oil
- Ingredients generally used: Worcestershire sauce; Sesame; Karashi; Salt
- Variations: Tonkatsu
- Similar dishes: Cutlet; Côtelette; Veal Milanese; Schnitzel

Gyūkatsu is a Japanese yoshoku (Western-style) dish consisting of sliced beef coated in breadcrumbs and deep-fried in cooking oil. It is also known by names such as beef katsu, bifukatsu, and beef cutlet.

== Overview ==
=== History ===
In the early Meiji era, a Western-style dish known as a "cutlet"—consisting of breaded veal pan-fried in oil—was introduced to Japan. Over time, the preparation method evolved into deep-frying (cooking in a large amount of oil), resulting in the form we recognize today.

From the Taishō era onward, the primary ingredient for cutlets in the Tokyo metropolitan area shifted from veal to pork. (Note: Katsudon (cutlet rice bowls) also transitioned from using beef cutlets to pork cutlets.) This shift is attributed to the demand for more affordable and accessible ingredients as Western-style cuisine became popularized among the general public, as well as the fact that pork suited the tastes of the Japanese people—particularly those in the Kanto region, where there is a strong culture of pork consumption.

In contrast, within the Kinki region—which includes Kobe, Osaka, and Kyoto—beef cutlets remained the standard rather than pork. Even today, with tonkatsu (pork cutlets)—which originated in Tokyo—having become widespread throughout Japan, beef cutlets continue to be a common staple in both home cooking and dining out within the Kinki region.

Although beef cutlets had become a relatively niche dish nationwide, they experienced a surge in popularity in Tokyo around 2015, and their recognition has since spread rapidly from the Tokyo metropolitan area to the rest of the country. This style of gyukatsu (breaded, deep-fried beef cutlet)—characterized by thick-cut, rare-cooked, and Japanese-style preparation—was conceived by "Bifukatsu Misono" (which opened in Nishi-Shinbashi in 1972 and closed in 2011) and later standardized by "Shimbashi Gyukatsu Okada" (which opened in 1996).

=== Varieties of Gyukatsu ===
- Katsumeshi – A local specialty of Kakogawa City, Hyōgo Prefecture; it consists of a beef cutlet served over white rice and topped with sauce.
- Kushikatsu – In the Kansai region (centered around Osaka), the primary meat used for kushikatsu (deep-fried skewers) is not pork, but rather lean beef or beef tendon.

Similar to steak, gyukatsu can be categorized by its level of doneness—such as rare, medium, or well-done—depending on how it is fried. Furthermore, as with other meats like pork, terms such as fillet cutlet (hire-katsu) and lion cutlet (rosu-katsu) are used to denote the specific cut of beef.

=== Gyukatsu Restaurant Chains ===
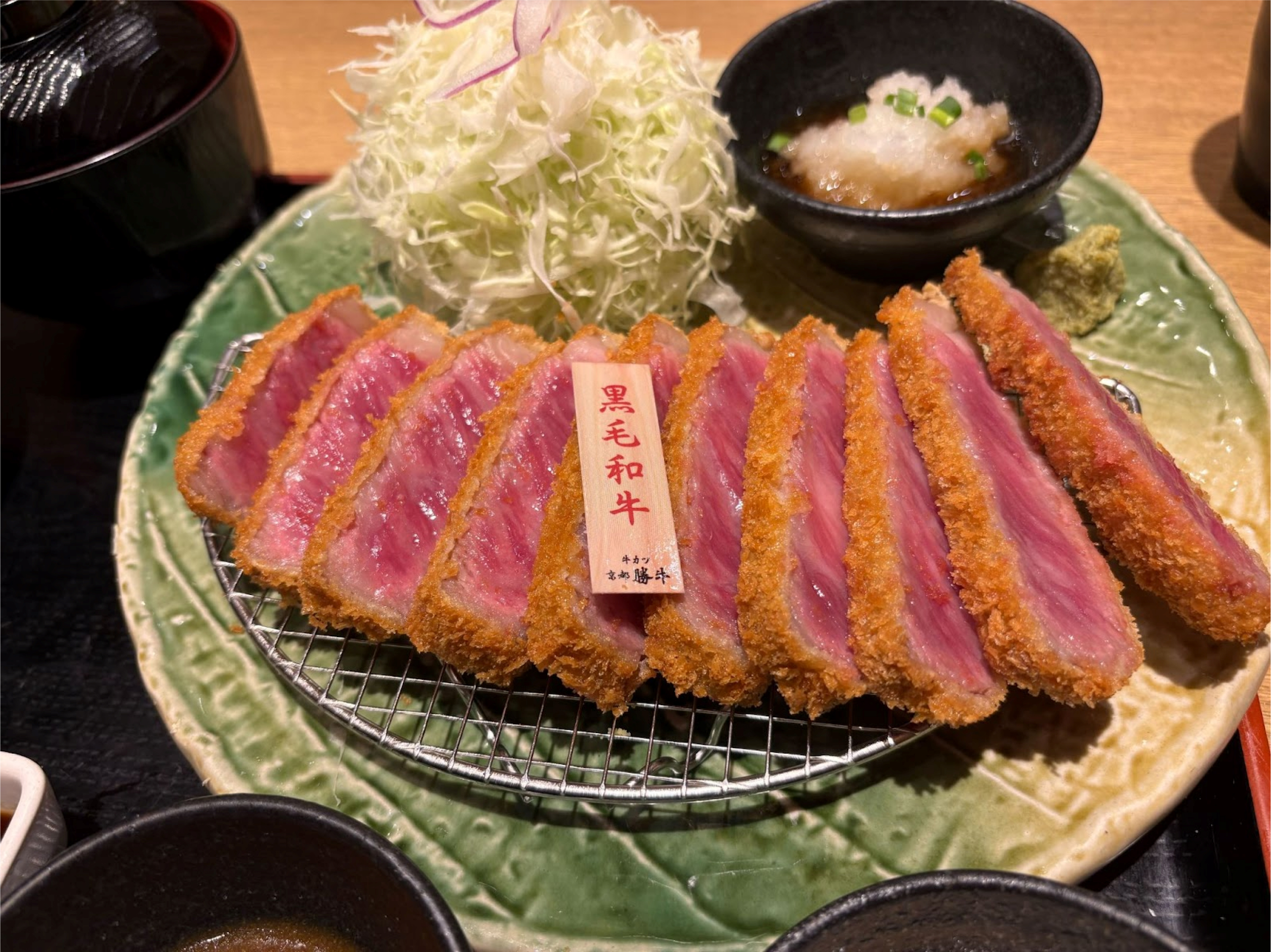
WAGYU GYUKATSU by Gyukatsu Kyoto Katsugyu

In 2024, Saint Marc Holdings acquired the operating companies for "Gyukatsu Kyoto Katsugyu" and "Gyukatsu Motomura," effectively controlling the majority of gyukatsu restaurant chains in Japan.

- Gyukatsu Kyoto Katsugyu – A gyukatsu (beef cutlet) specialty restaurant chain founded in 2014. It is the largest chain of its kind, with locations across Japan and numerous branches overseas. Operated by Golip Co., Ltd.—a company also known for its samgyeopsal (Korean-style pork belly) specialty restaurants—and based in Kyoto, it offers a style of gyukatsu that has gained popularity in recent years: a Japanese set-meal (teishoku) format. This differs from the traditional "beef cutlet" (bifukatsu) long favored in the Kansai region (particularly in Hyogo Prefecture). Customers can choose from various cuts, such as loin, tongue, or fillet, and enjoy them with a wide array of condiments and sauces. The chain uses whole cuts of beef—sourced from both Japan and abroad—and serves them in a medium-rare style.
- Gyukatsu Motomura – A gyukatsu specialty restaurant chain that originated in Tokyo in 2015. It is the second-largest gyukatsu chain after Kyoto Katsugyu. The menu is simple, offering essentially only one type of gyukatsu. As noted in the restaurants and on their website, the beef used is "injection-processed" (lean beef infused with beef tallow and food additives). Each customer is provided with their own individual grill, allowing them to cook the meat to their preference. It is highly popular among international tourists.
- Gyukatsu Aona – Another gyukatsu specialty restaurant chain, founded in Tokyo in 2014. It currently operates only five locations, all within Tokyo. Like Kyoto Katsugyu, it uses whole cuts of beef, offering various lean options that differ in origin and grade. The gyukatsu is served thinly sliced and very rare; it is intended to be eaten as-is, without further grilling. The chain is also known for its colorful, vibrant salads.

== See also ==
- Katsudon
- Chicken katsu
