= Katsudon =

Japanese rice meal

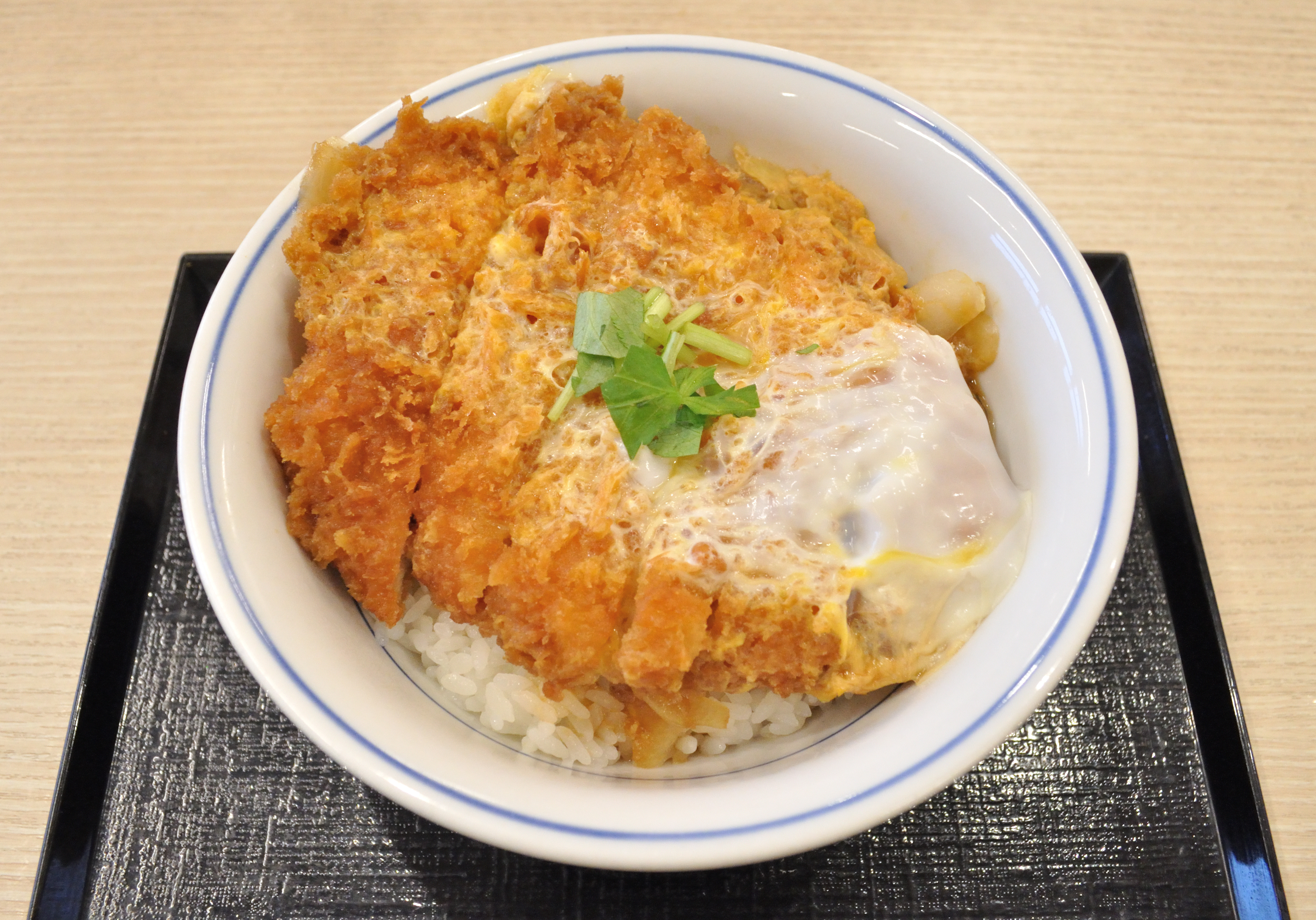
- Katsudon, or tonkatsu with rice
- Course: Main
- Place of origin: Japan
- Main ingredients: Tonkatsu, tonkatsu sauce, panko, egg, Japanese rice

Katsudon (Japanese: カツ丼; IPA: [katsɯdoɴ]) is a popular Japanese food, a bowl of rice topped with a fried tonkatsu pork cutlet, egg, vegetables, and condiments. The dish's name is a portmanteau of the Japanese words tonkatsu (pork cutlet) and donburi (rice bowl).

== Preparation ==
The tonkatsu for the katsudon dish is prepared by dipping the cutlet in flour, followed by egg, then dipping in panko breadcrumbs, and deep-frying. Next, into a boiling broth of dashi, soy sauce and onions, the sliced tonkatsu and a beaten egg is cooked.

== Variants ==
Other bowls, made of cutlet and rice but without eggs or stock, may also be called katsudon. Such dishes include:

- sōsu katsudon (sauce katsudon): with tonkatsu sauce or Worcestershire sauce, from regions such as Fukui, Kōfu, Gunma, Aizuwakamatsu and Komagane
- demi katsudon or domi katsudon: with demi-glace and often green peas, a specialty of Okayama
- shōyu-dare katsudon: with soy sauce-based tare sauce, Niigata-style
- misokatsu-don: misokatsu tonkatsu with a sauce made with hatchō miso on rice, a favorite in Nagoya
Variants of katsudon

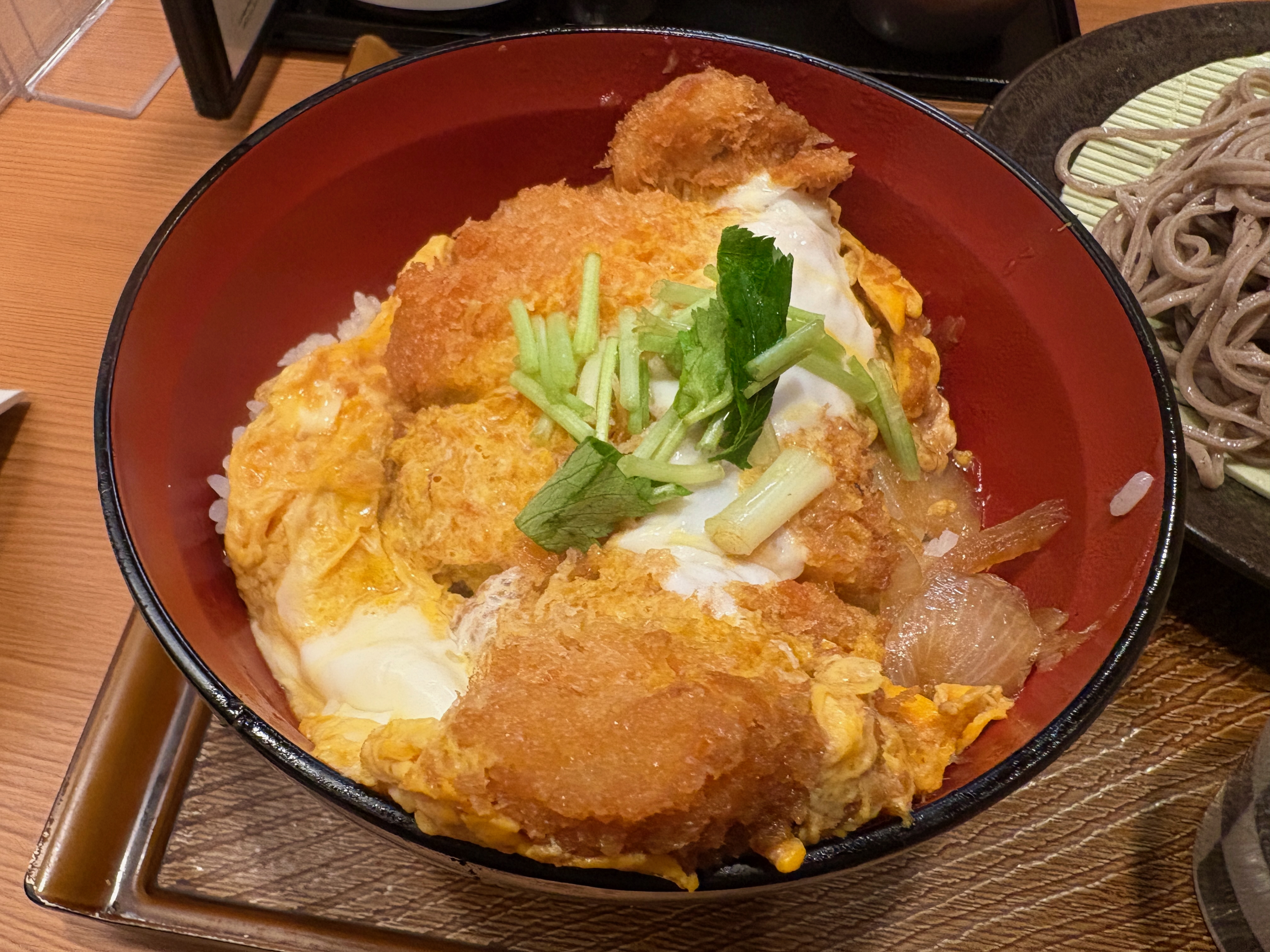
With egg and onion

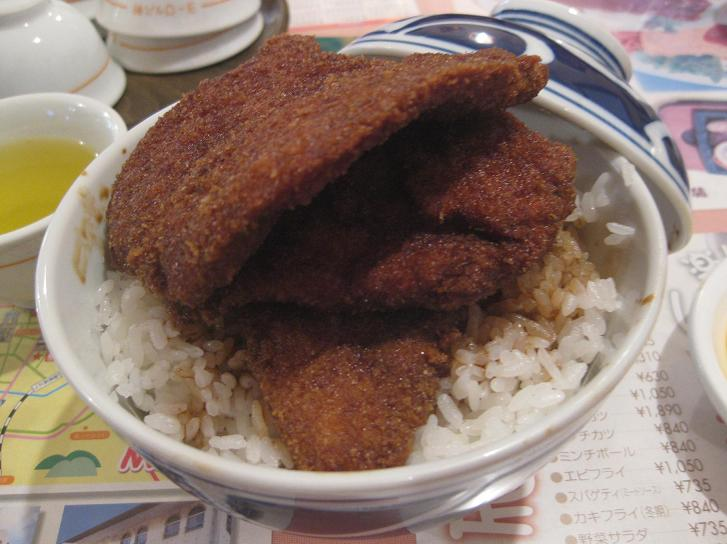
Marinated in Worcestershire sauce

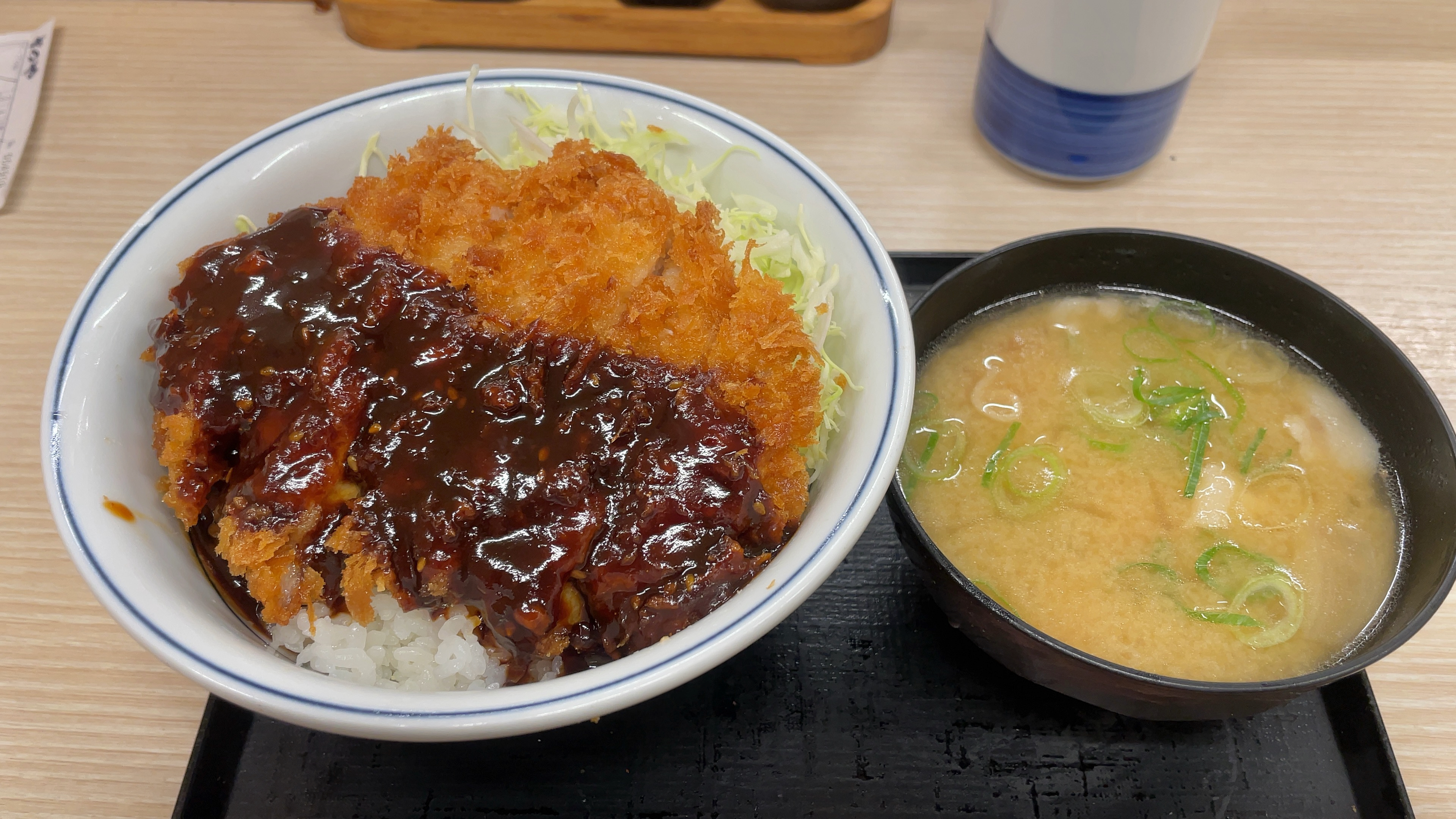
With tonkatsu sauce and tonjiru

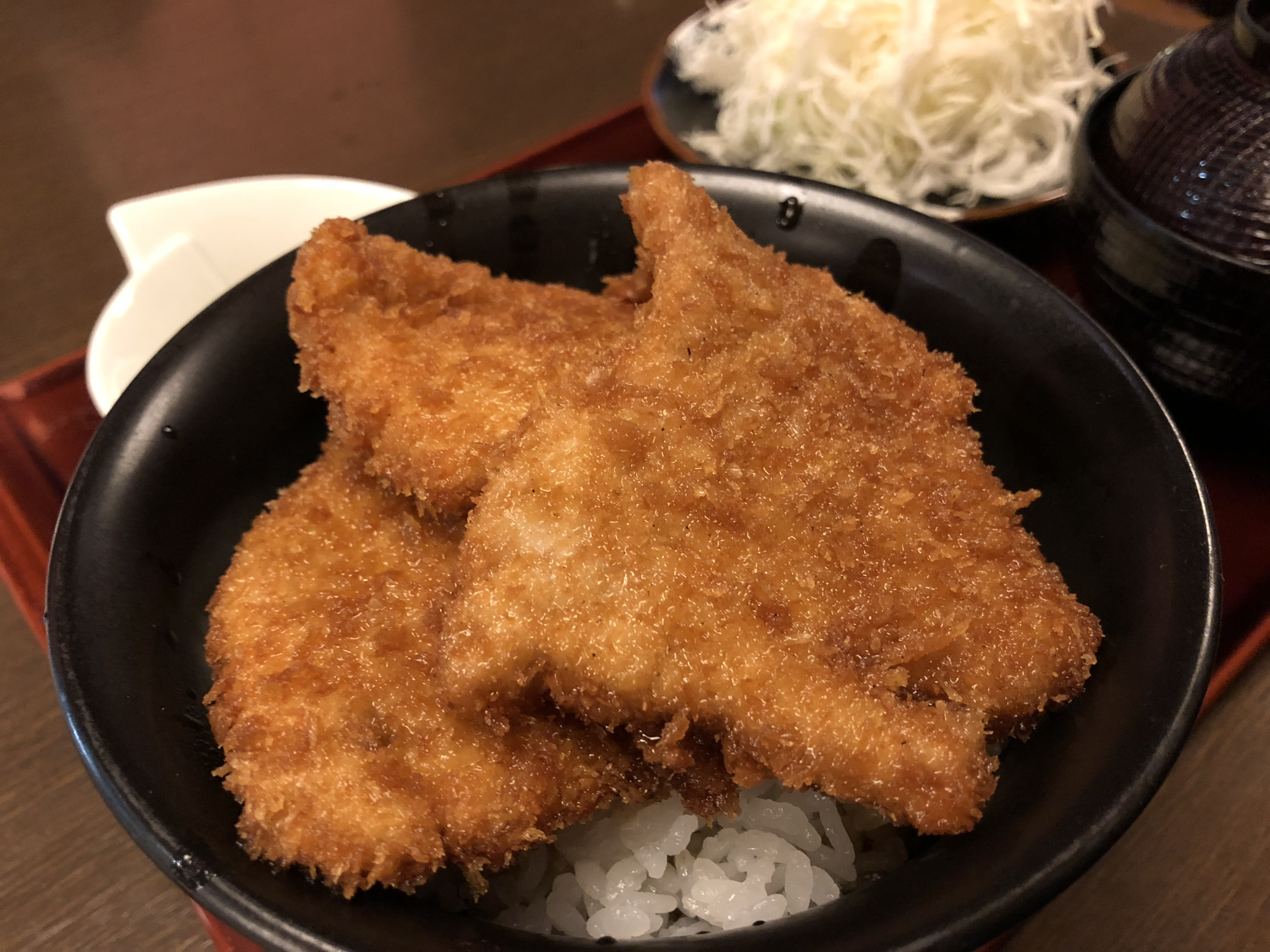
Shōyu-dare katsudon, soy sauce flavor

If pork is substituted with beef, it will be gyū-katsu-don. A variation made with chicken katsu and egg is called oyako katsudon, which is distinguished from oyakodon where the meat in the latter is not fried.

== In culture ==
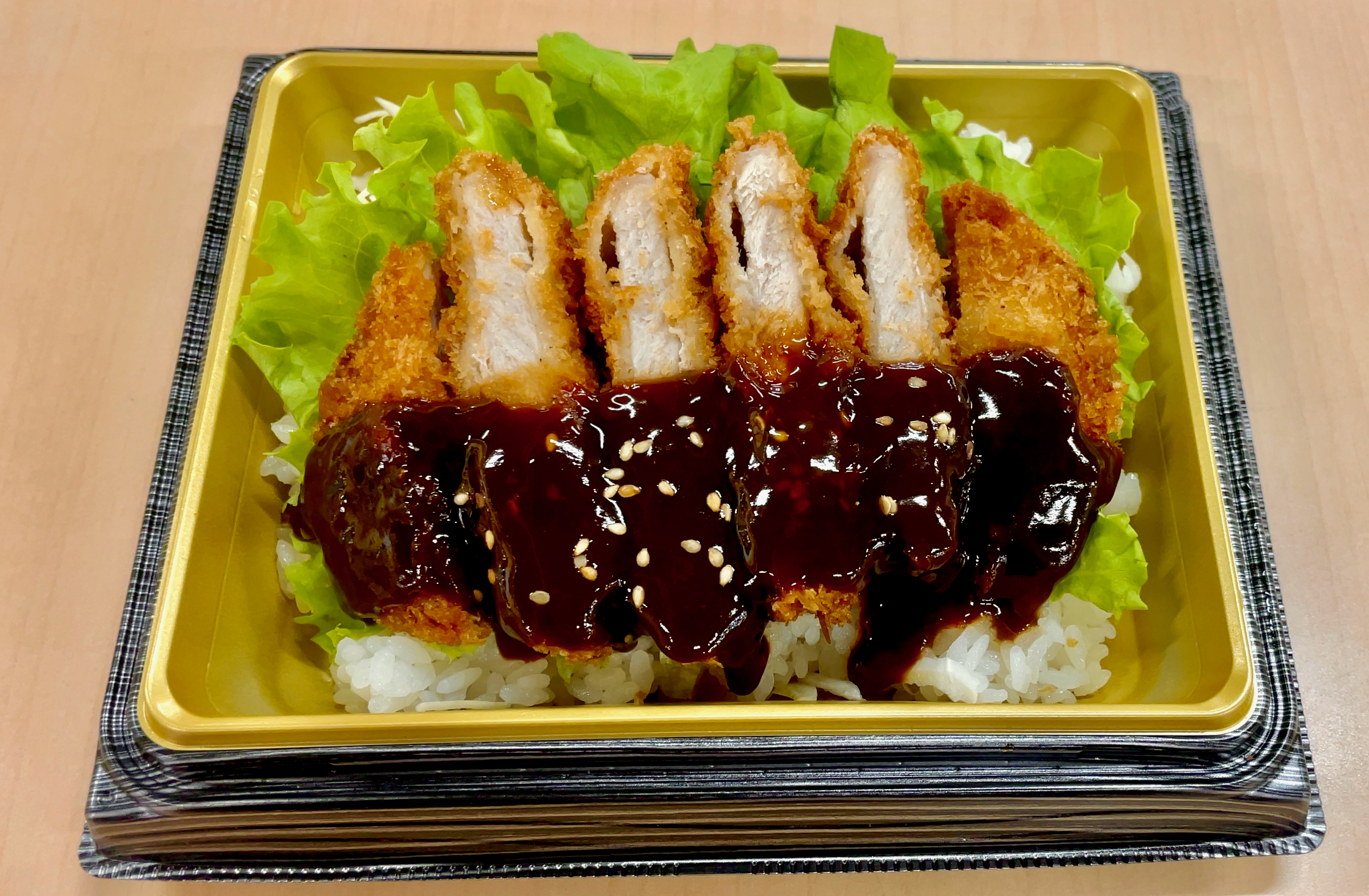
Katsudon with miso sauce

It has become a modern tradition for Japanese students to eat katsudon the night before taking a major test or school entrance exam. This is because "katsu" is a homophone of the verb katsu (勝つ), meaning "to win" or "to be victorious". It is also a trope in Japanese police films: that suspects will speak the truth with tears when they have eaten katsudon and are asked, "Did you ever think about how your mother feels about this?" Even nowadays, the gag of "We must eat katsudon while interrogating" is popular in Japanese films. However, as of 2019, police will never actually feed suspects during interrogation.

== See also ==
- Donburi: Japanese bowls of food on rice
  - Gyūdon: with simmered beef
  - Oyakodon: with chicken and egg
  - Unadon: with eel
- Tonkatsu: deep-fried pork cutlet
  - Katsu curry: another tonkatsu dish with curry sauce and without eggs, served in a plate with spoon, not in a bowl with chopsticks.
- Escalope
