= Tonkatsu =

Japanese dish of deep-fried pork

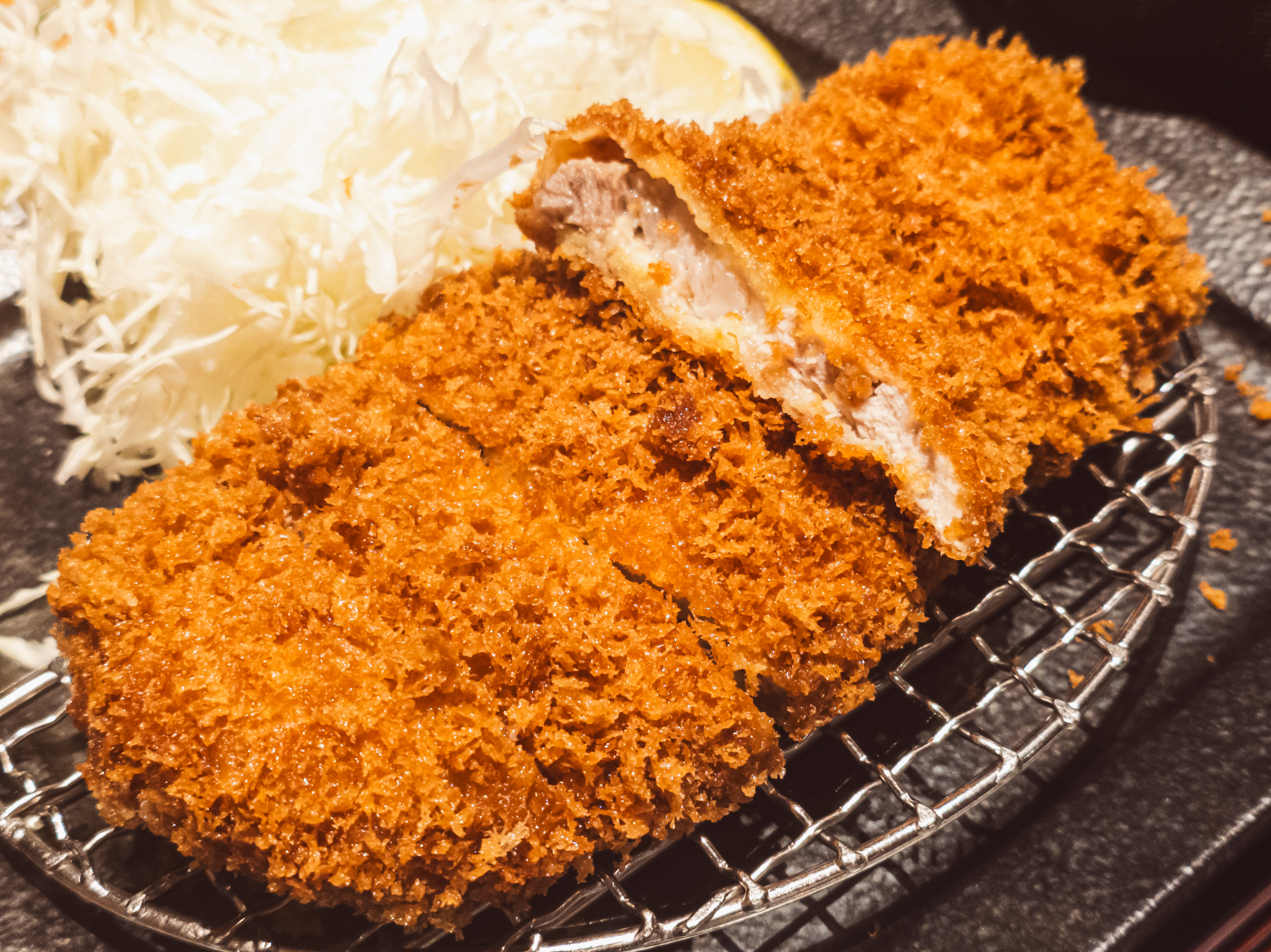
- Tonkatsu, fried pork cutlet
- Place of origin: Japan
- Region or state: East Asia
- Main ingredients: Cutlet (pork fillet or loin), panko, cooking oil

Tonkatsu (豚カツ, とんかつ or トンカツ; pronounced [toŋkatsɯ]; "Japanese pork cutlet") is a type of Japanese cutlet (カツレツ, katsuretsu) made from pork. Slices of pork loin or fillet are coated with panko (bread crumbs) and then deep-fried in oil.

Along with karē raisu and korokke, tonkatsu was considered one of the "three great yōshoku", popular Western-style Japanese dishes that were introduced to Japan.

== Etymology ==
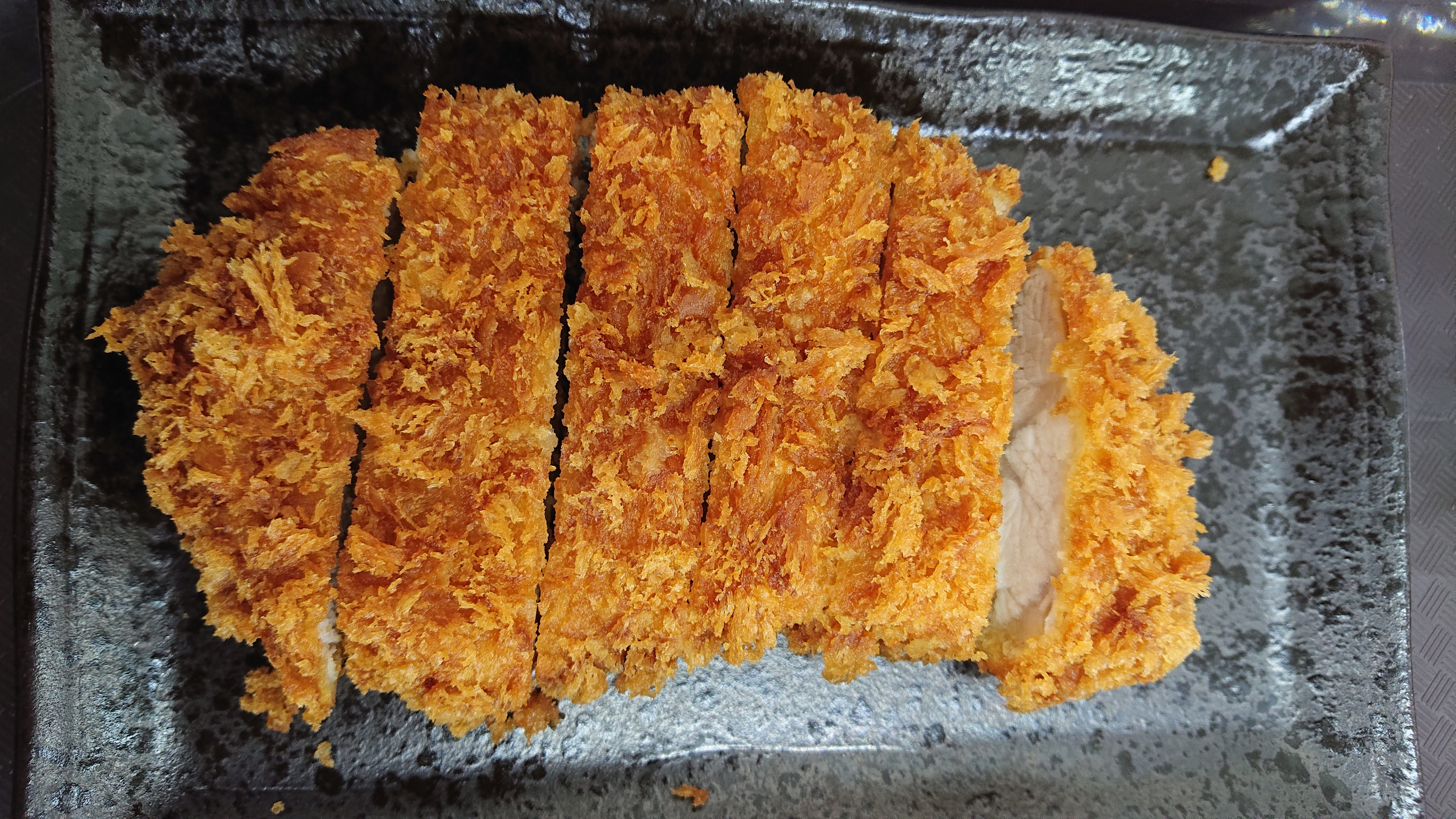
Sliced tonkatsu

The word tonkatsu is a combination of the Sino-Japanese word ton (豚) meaning "pig", and katsu (カツ), which is a shortened form of katsuretsu (カツレツ), an old transliteration of the English word "cutlet", which was in turn adopted from the French word côtelette.

== History ==
Tonkatsu originated in Japan during the Meiji era in the late 19th century, a dish derived from a French dish known as côtelette de veau, a veal cutlet coated in breadcrumbs and fried in a pan with butter.

European katsuretsu (loanword/gairaigo for 'cutlet') was usually made with beef; the pork version was created in 1899 at a restaurant serving European-style foods named Rengatei in Tokyo, Japan. It is a type of yōshoku—Japanese versions of European cuisine invented in the late 19th and early 20th centuries—and was called katsuretsu or simply katsu.

In the early Meiji era, several variations of katsuretsu were developed. These included beef cutlets (ビーフカツレツ, bīfu katsuretsu), chicken cutlets (チキンカツレツ, chikin katsuretsu), and pork cutlets (ポークカツレツ, pōku katsuretsu). Of these variations, it was the pōku katsuretsu that became the direct predecessor of modern tonkatsu.

Pork cutlets (ポークカツレツ, pōku katsuretsu) began to gain popularity around 1907 and eventually became established as one of the "three great yōshoku" (三大洋食, sandai yōshoku) during the Taishō era. As its popularity grew among the Japanese public, the modern form of tonkatsu, distinguished by its use of a thick cut of pork, began to be sold in 1929 (Shōwa 4) in the Okachimachi neighborhood of Ueno, Tokyo.

== Preparation and serving ==
Freshly-served tonkatsu with shredded cabbage

Either a pork fillet (ヒレ, hire) or pork loin (ロース, rōsu) cut may be used; the meat is usually salted, peppered, dredged lightly in flour, dipped into beaten egg and then coated with panko (bread crumbs) before being deep-fried.

Tonkatsu is then sliced into bits and served, commonly with shredded cabbage. It is most commonly eaten with a thick Worcestershire-style sauce called tonkatsu sauce or simply sōsu (sauce), karashi (mustard), and perhaps a slice of lemon. It is usually served with rice, miso soup and tsukemono and eaten with chopsticks. It may also be served with ponzu and grated daikon instead of tonkatsu sauce.

== Variations ==
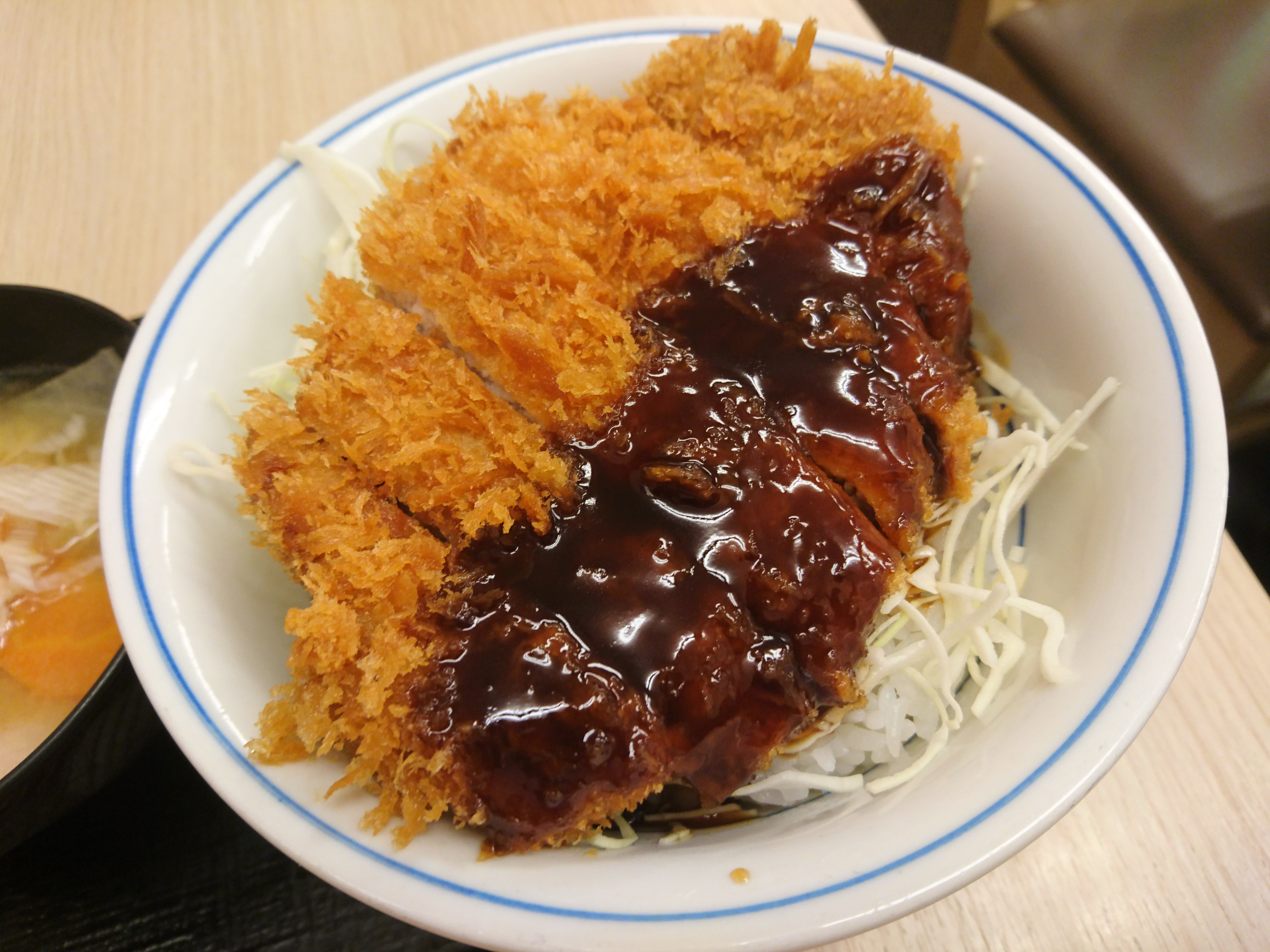
Katsudon, or tonkatsu with rice

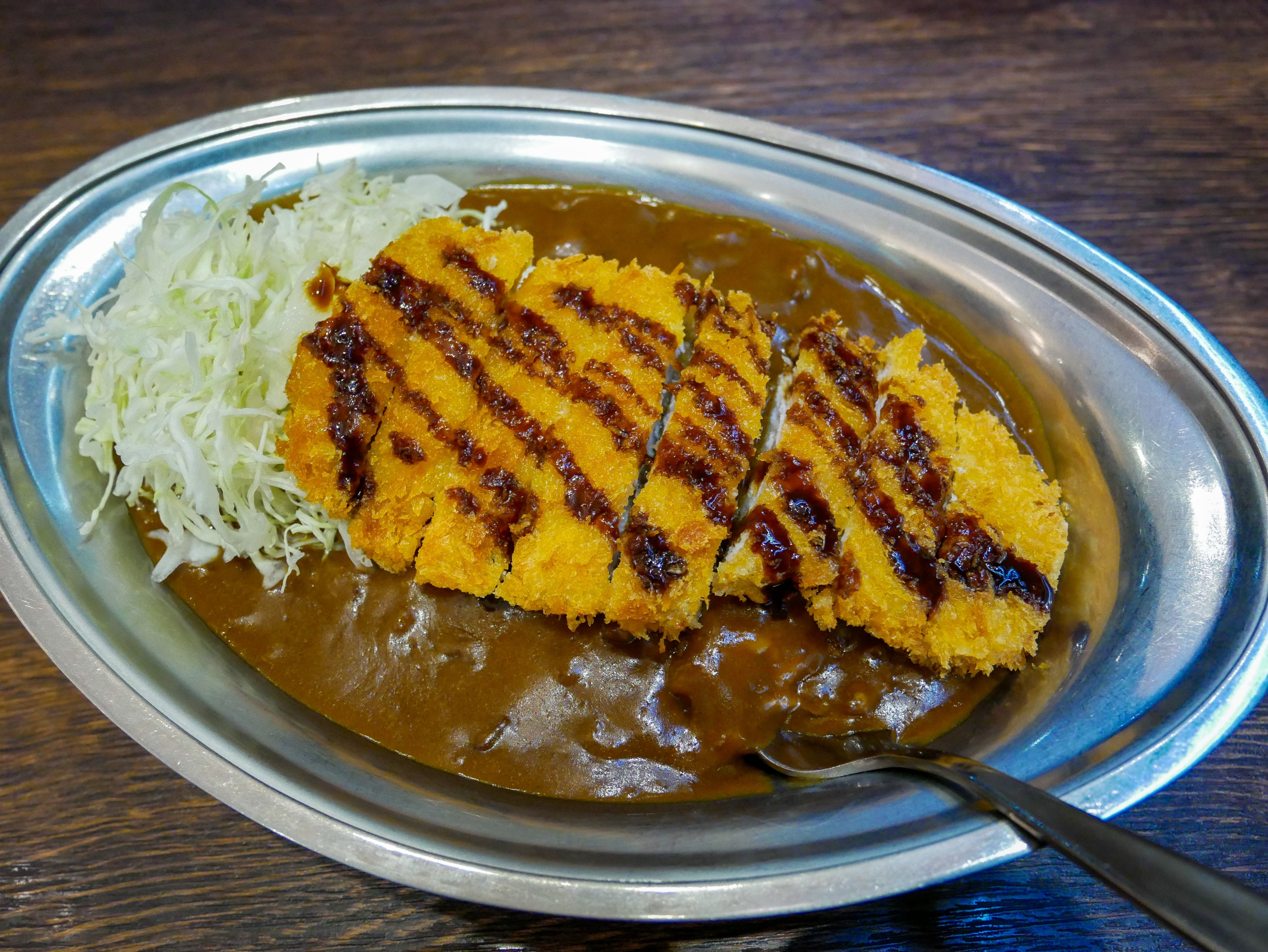
Tonkatsu on katsu curry

Tonkatsu is also popular as katsu curry, where it is served with Japanese curry, or as katsudon, simmered with egg and broth, then served on a big bowl of rice; there is also katsu rice, which is pork cutlet served on rice topped with demi-glace sauce. Another popular variation, katsu-sando or pork cutlet sandwich, is said to be originated from the Isen, a tonkatsu restaurant. In the 1930s, the manager of the Isen came up with the concept, then improved it by making the sandwich smaller so that its clientele of local geishas could enjoy it without wearing off their lipstick.

In Nagoya and surrounding areas, miso katsu, tonkatsu eaten with a hatchō miso-based sauce, is a speciality.

Variations on tonkatsu may be made by sandwiching an ingredient such as cheese or shiso leaf between the meat, and then breading and frying.

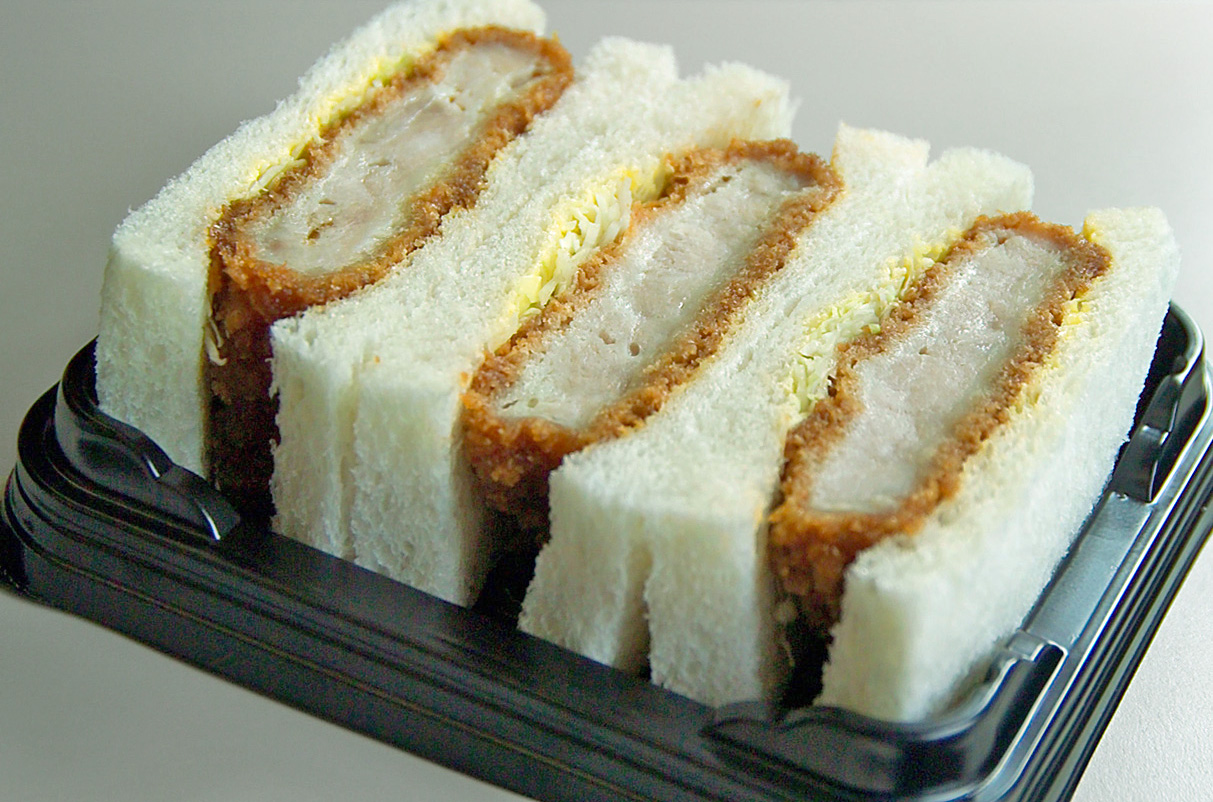
Katsu-sando, a tonkatsu sandwich, served as an ekiben

Variations of katsu other than pork:

- Chicken katsu (チキンカツ) or tori katsu (鶏カツ), which uses chicken instead, often appears in Hawaiian plate lunches.
- Menchi-katsu (メンチカツ) or minchi katsu (ミンチカツ mince katsu), is a minced meat patty, breaded and deep fried.
- Hamu katsu (ハムカツ ham katsu), a similar dish made from ham, is usually considered a budget alternative to tonkatsu.
- Gyū katsu (牛カツ beef katsu), also known as bīfu katsu, is popular in the Kansai region around Osaka and Kobe.

In general, breaded and deep-fried foods are called furai ("fry"), such as ebi-furai (fried prawn) and aji-furai (fried horse mackerel), but fried meat such as pork, beef and chicken is referred to as katsu (cutlet). Katsu and furai differ from tempura, which is not breaded but battered and typically fried in sesame oil.

In recent years, chicken katsu curry has become extremely popular in the United Kingdom, to the point that other varieties of Japanese curry and curry sauce are sometimes referred to as katsu erroneously.

== Gallery ==
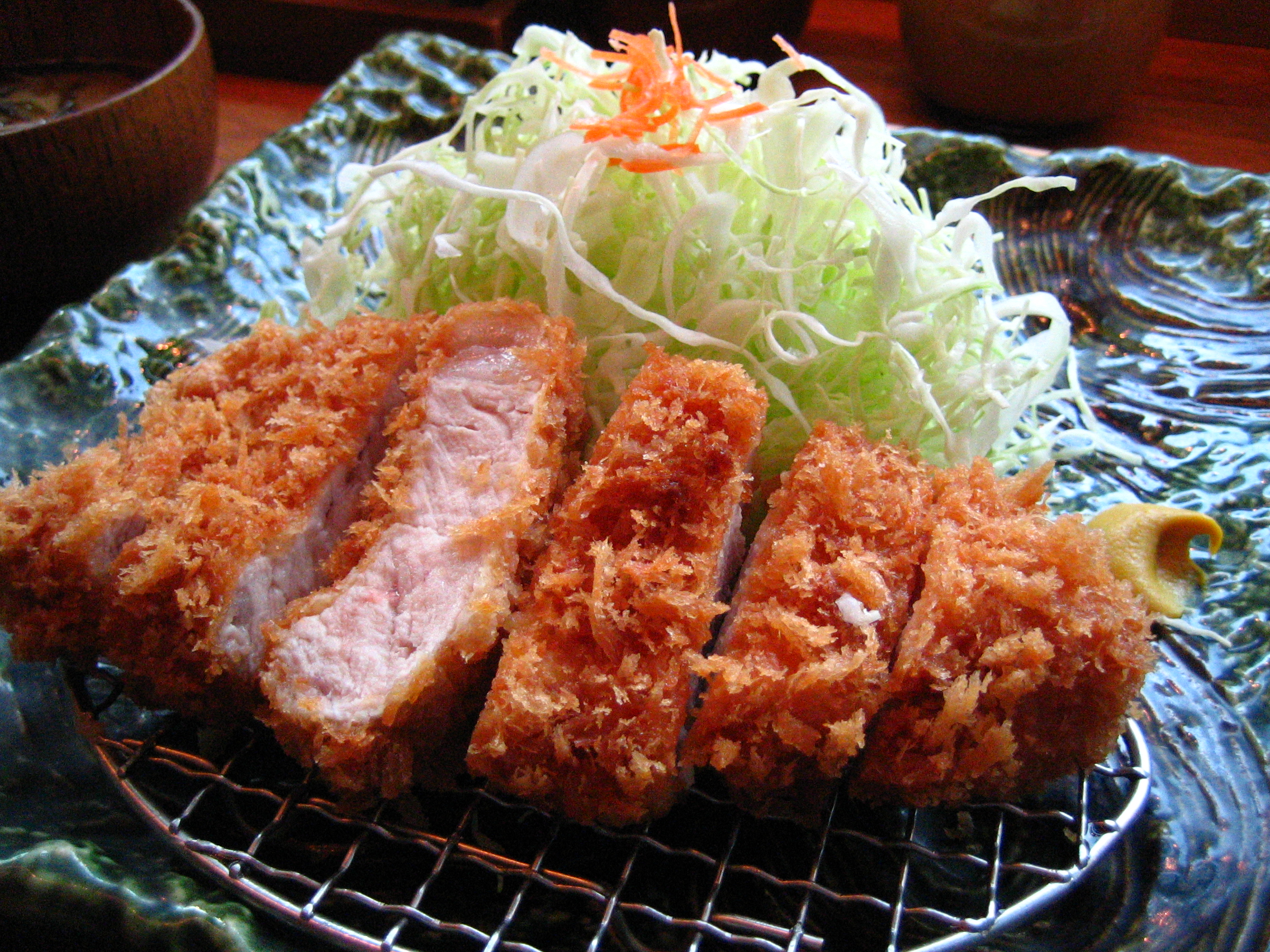

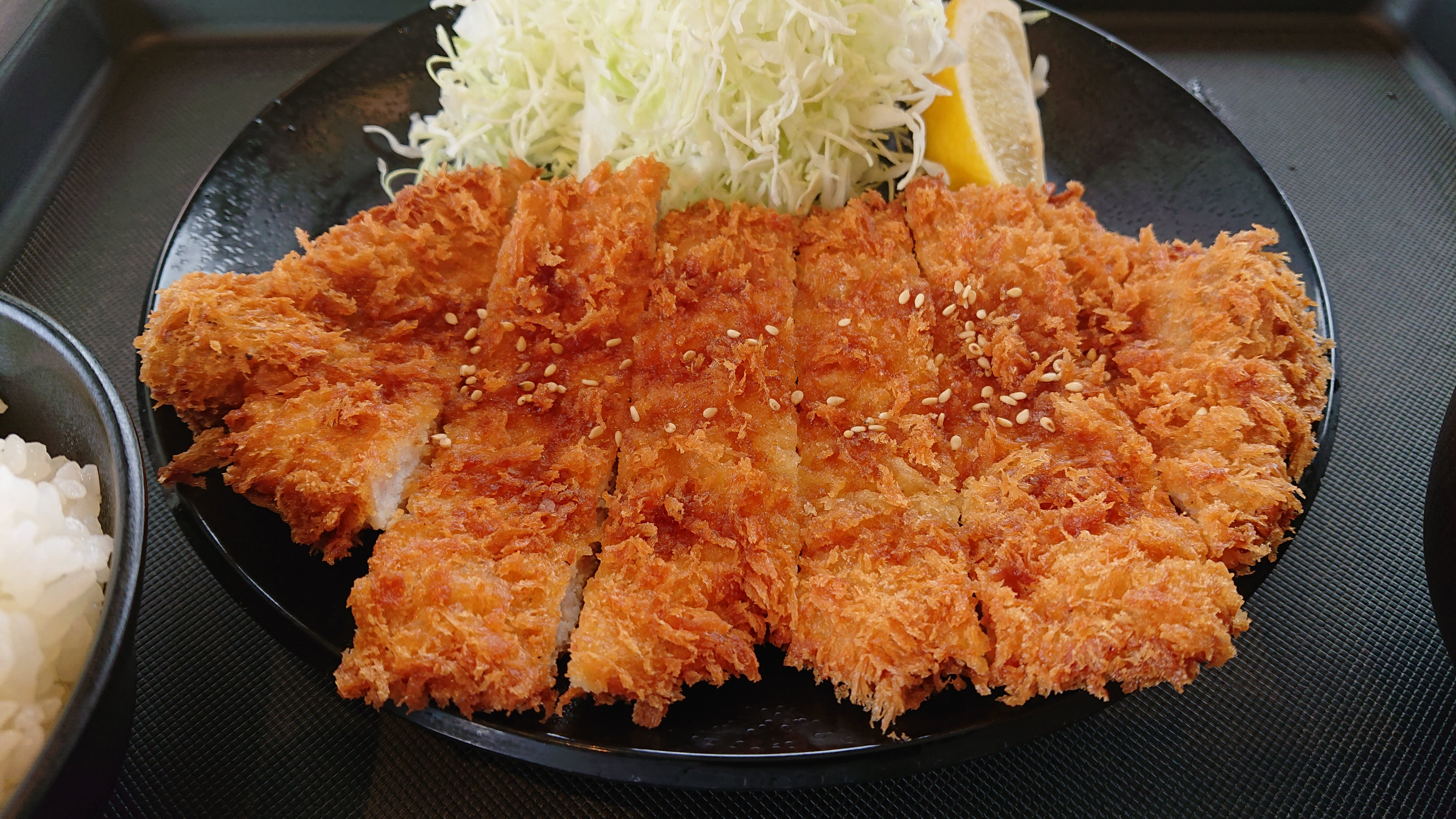

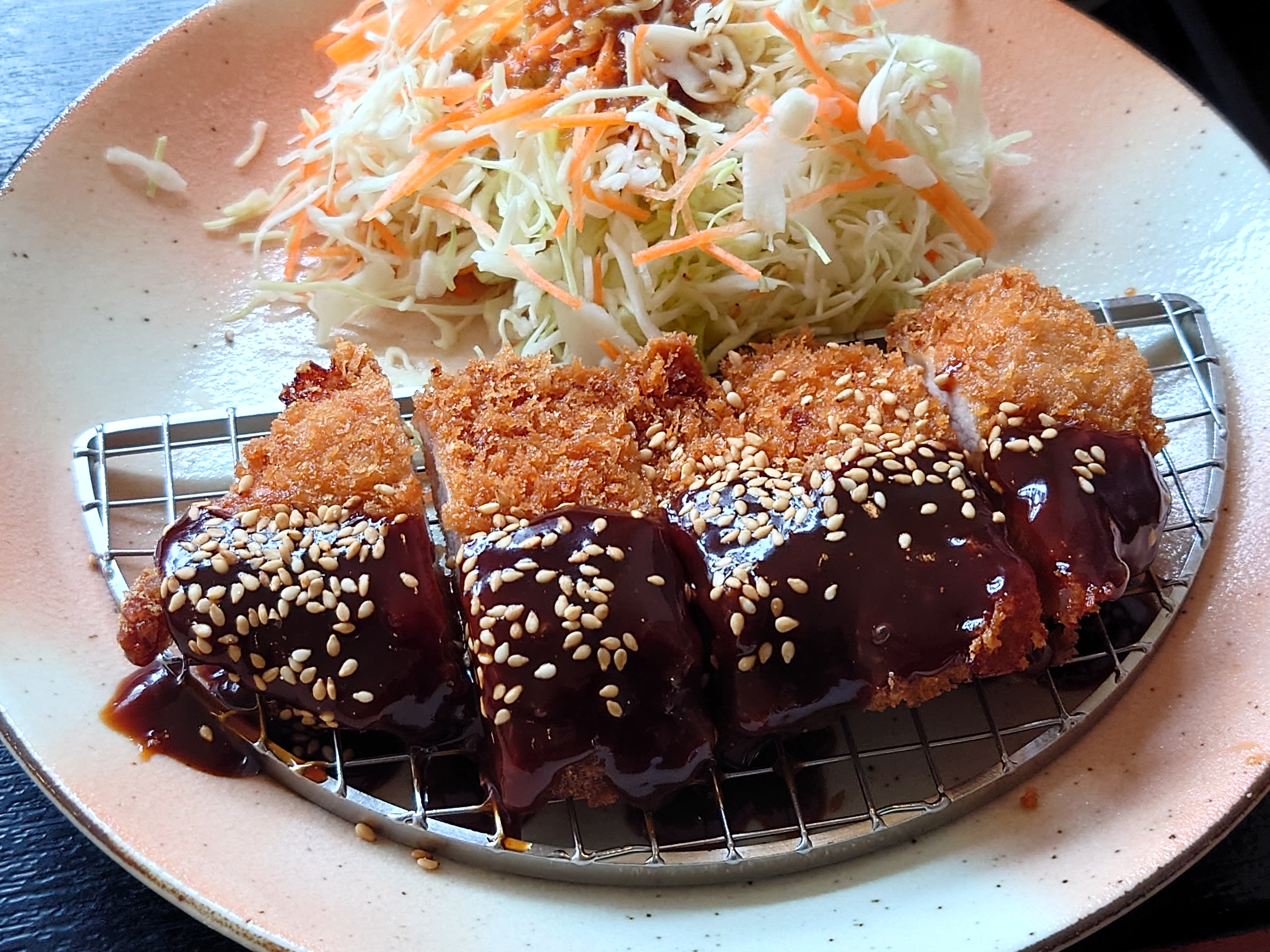
With miso sauce

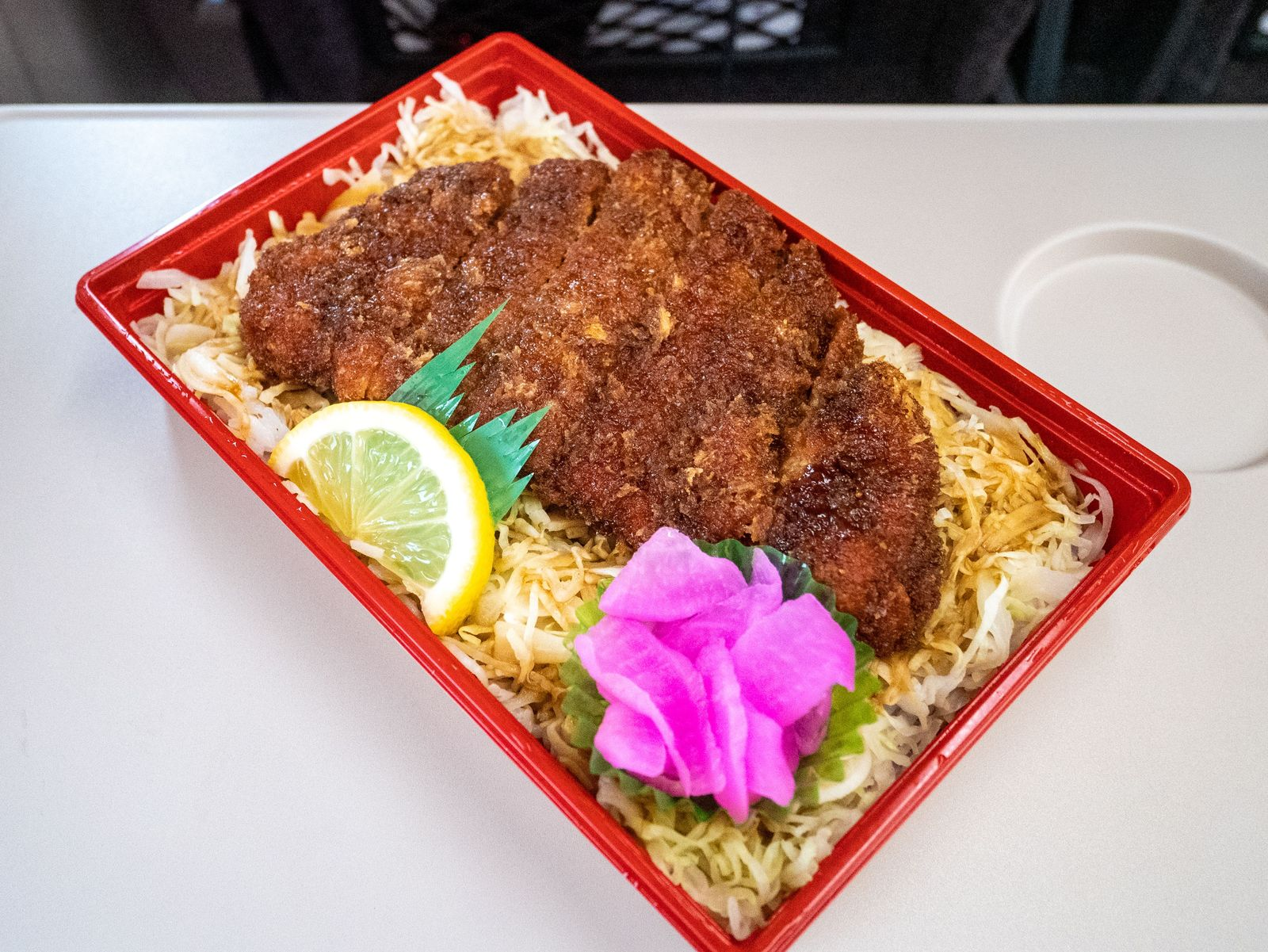
Tonkatsu in a bento

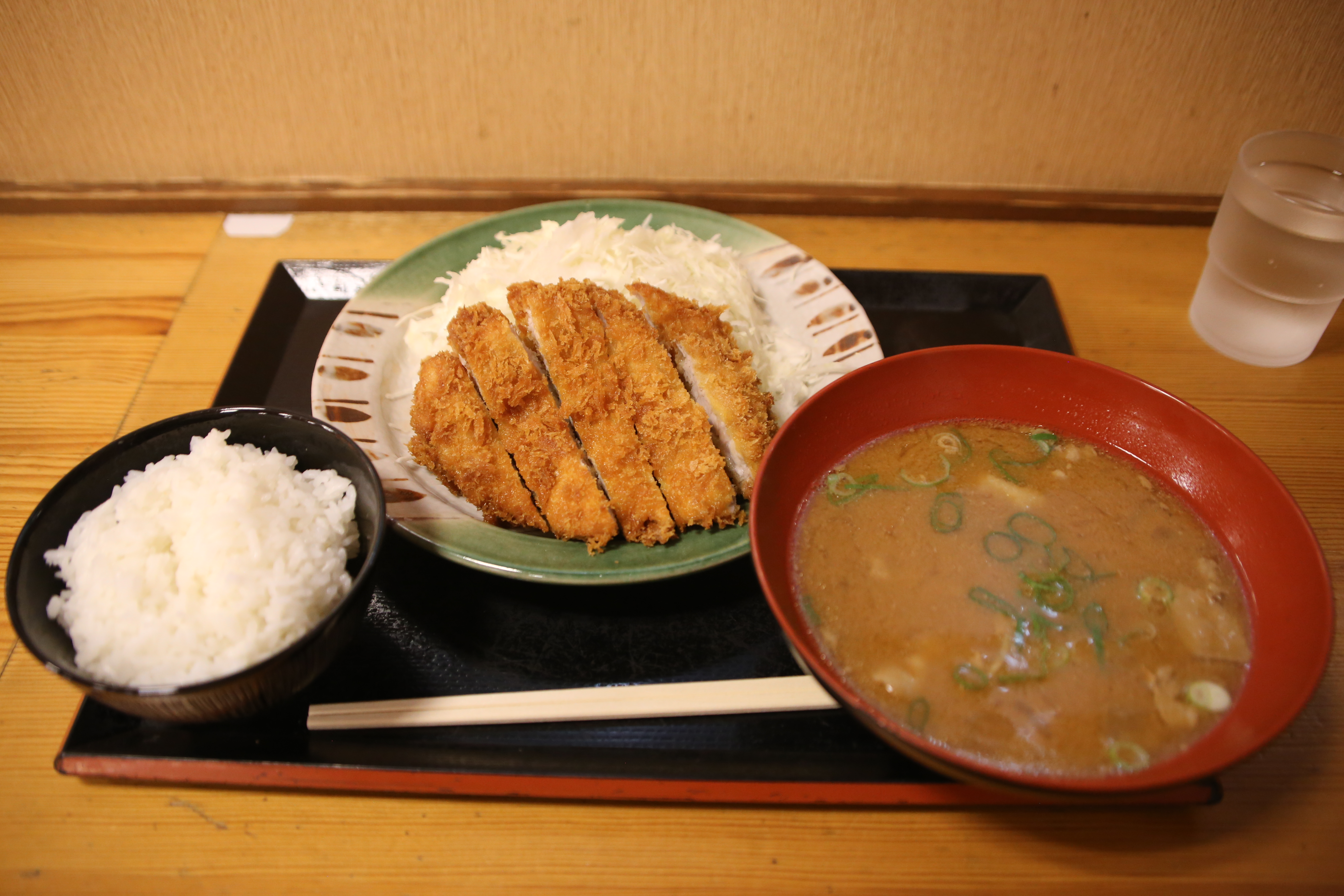
With rice and miso soup

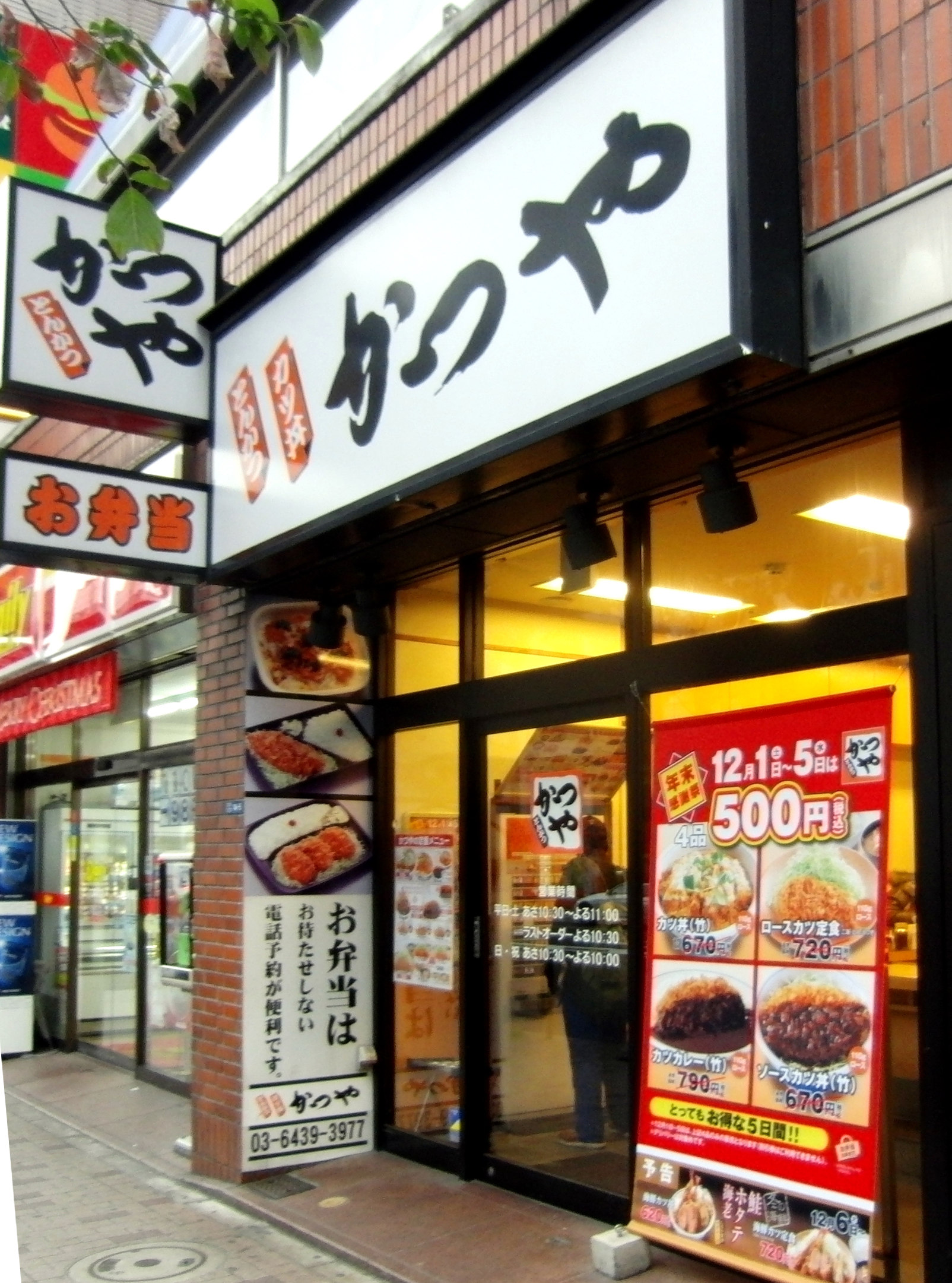
Tonkatsu chain restaurant Katsuya in Tokyo

== See also ==
- Media related to Tonkatsu at Wikimedia Commons
- Tonkatsu at the Wikibooks Cookbook subproject
- Japanese cuisine
- List of Japanese dishes – a category of deep-fried dishes in Japanese cuisine
- List of pork dishes
- Milanesa
- Schnitzel
- Dongaseu – a Korean dish derived from tonkatsu
- Escalope

== Bibliography ==
- Okada, Tetsu (2012) [2000]. とんかつの誕生 - 明治洋食事始め [The Birth of Tonkatsu: The Beginnings of Meiji Western Cuisine] (in Japanese). 講談社 (Kodansha). ISBN 978-4-06-292123-7.
