= Rengatei =

Restaurant in Tokyo, Japan

Rengatei (煉瓦亭)
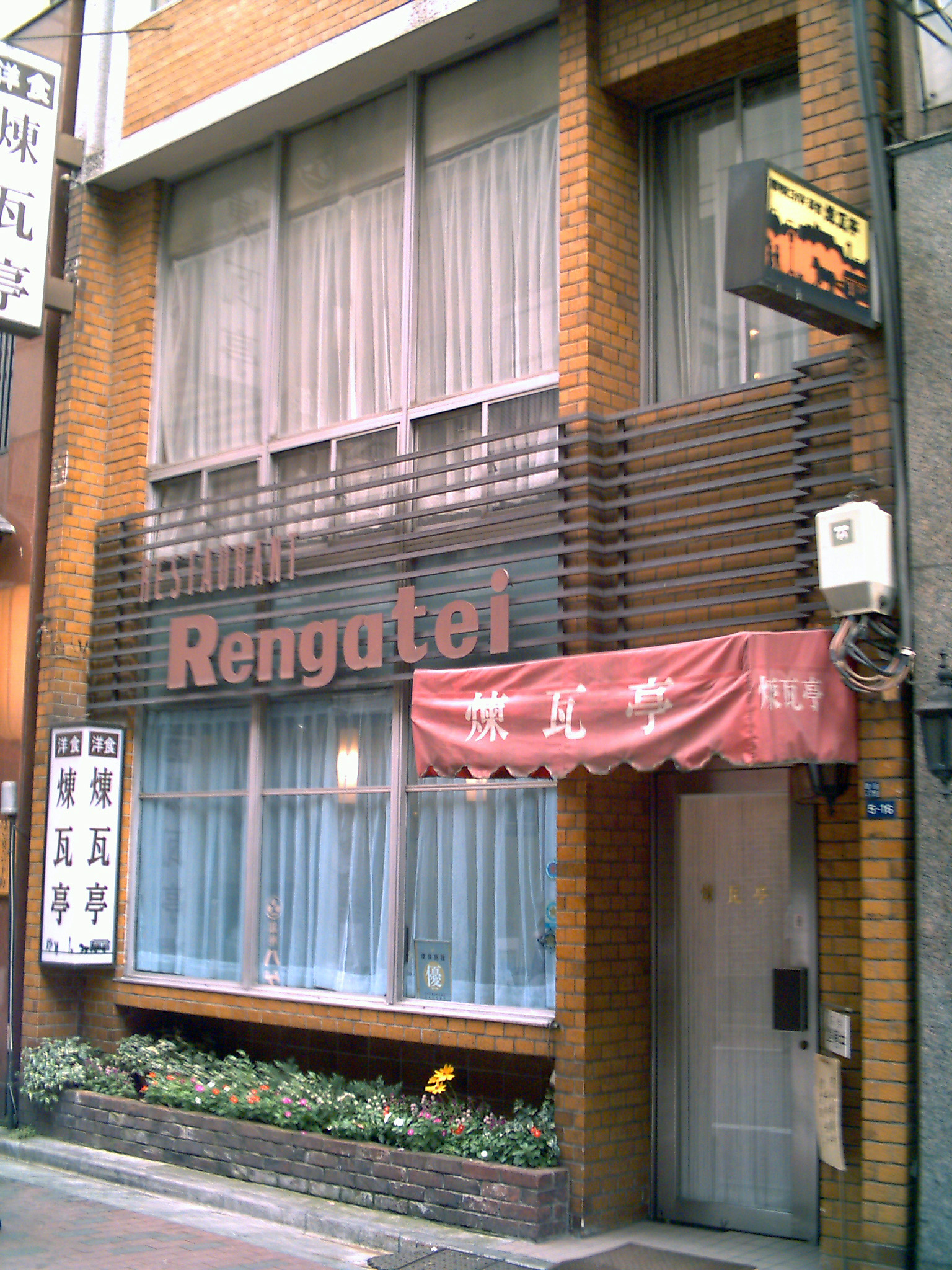
- Omuraisu served at Rengatei
- Interactive map of Rengatei (煉瓦亭)

Restaurant information
- Established: 1895
- Food type: Yōshoku
- Location: Tokyo, Japan

Rengatei (Japanese: 煉瓦亭) is a yōshoku restaurant in Ginza, Tokyo established in 1895.

The pork version of tonkatsu was invented there in 1899. (At the time it was called "Katsuretsu.")

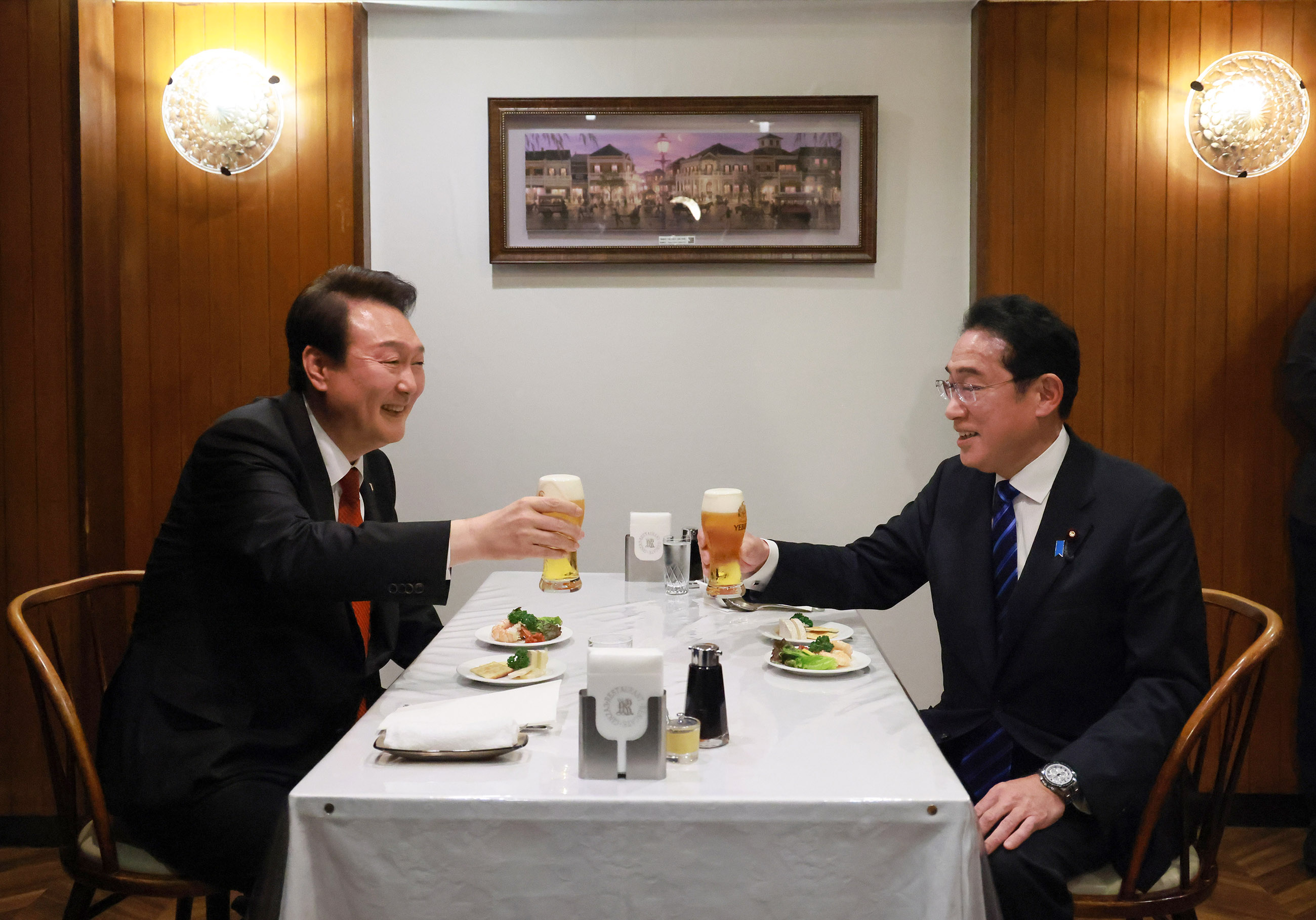
Political leaders of Japan and Korea at Rengatei

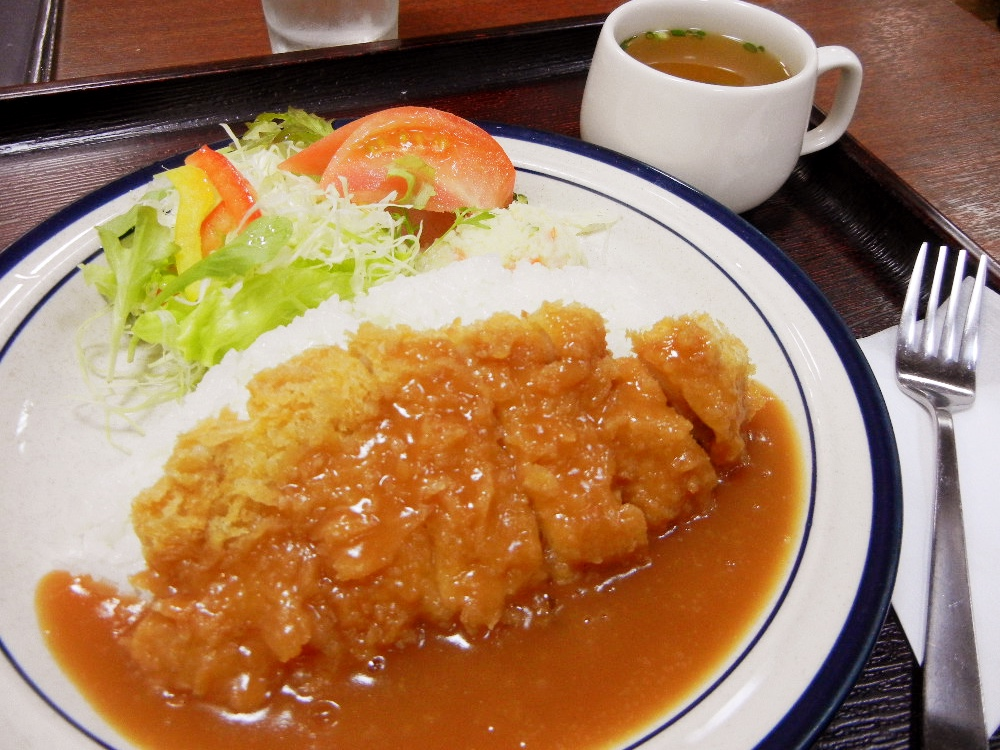
Yofu Katsudon at Rengatei

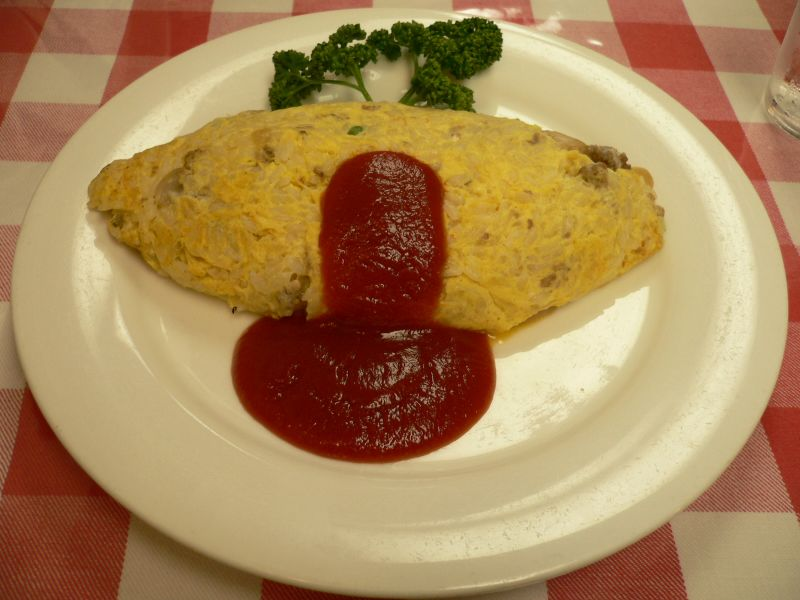
Omuraisu at Rengatei

On March 16, 2023, Prime Minister Fumio Kishida held a summit meeting and other events with President Yoon Seok-yeol of the Republic of Korea, and afterwards had dinner at Rengatei.
