= Karashi =

Japanese mustard

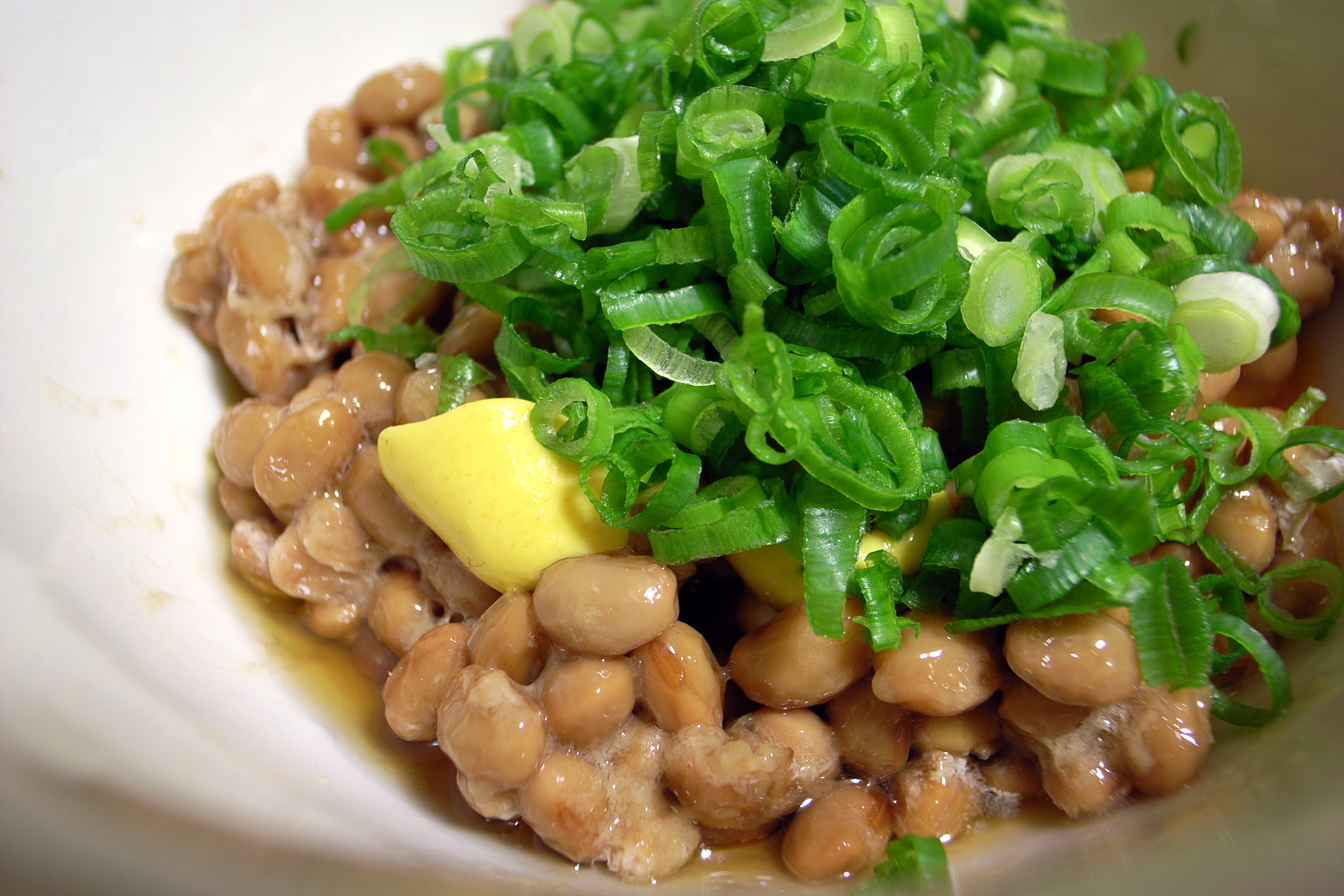
Karashi on nattō, topped with green onion

Karashi (芥子, 辛子, からし, or カラシ), also known as oni karashi, is a type of mustard used as a condiment or as a seasoning in Japanese cuisine. Karashi is made from the crushed seeds of Brassica juncea (brown mustard) and is usually sold in either powdered or paste form. Karashi in powdered form is prepared by mixing with tepid water to a paste and leaving it covered for a few minutes.

Karashi is often served with tonkatsu, oden, nattō, and shumai. It can be used as part of a dipping sauce when mixed with mayonnaise, called karashi mayonnaise or with vinegar and miso, called karashi su miso. It is also used to make pickled Japanese eggplant, called karashi-nasu.

One of Kumamoto's best-known meibutsu (regional specialities) is karashi renkon: lotus root stuffed with karashi-flavoured miso, deep fried, and served in slices.

== Gallery ==
Karashi is served with various dishes. It is considerably stronger than American or French mustard, so a small amount is enough.

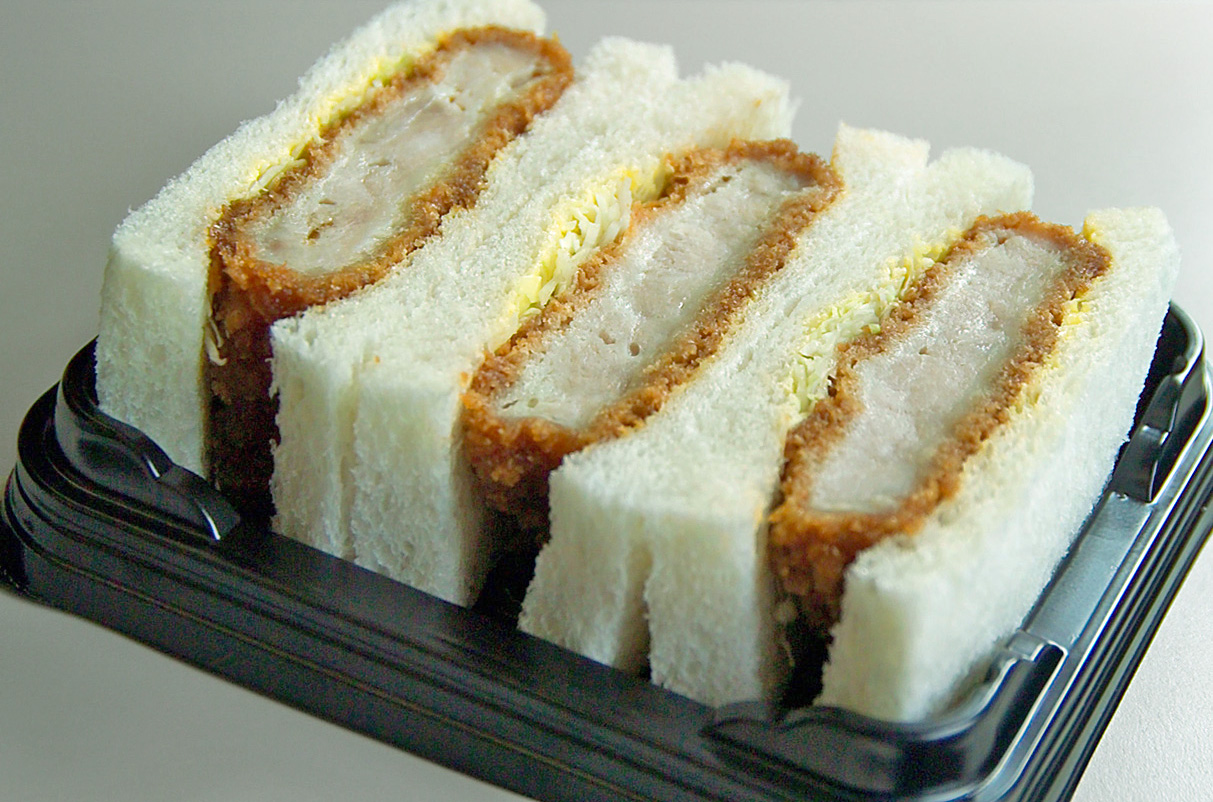
Cutlet sandwich with Karashi-Butter spread.

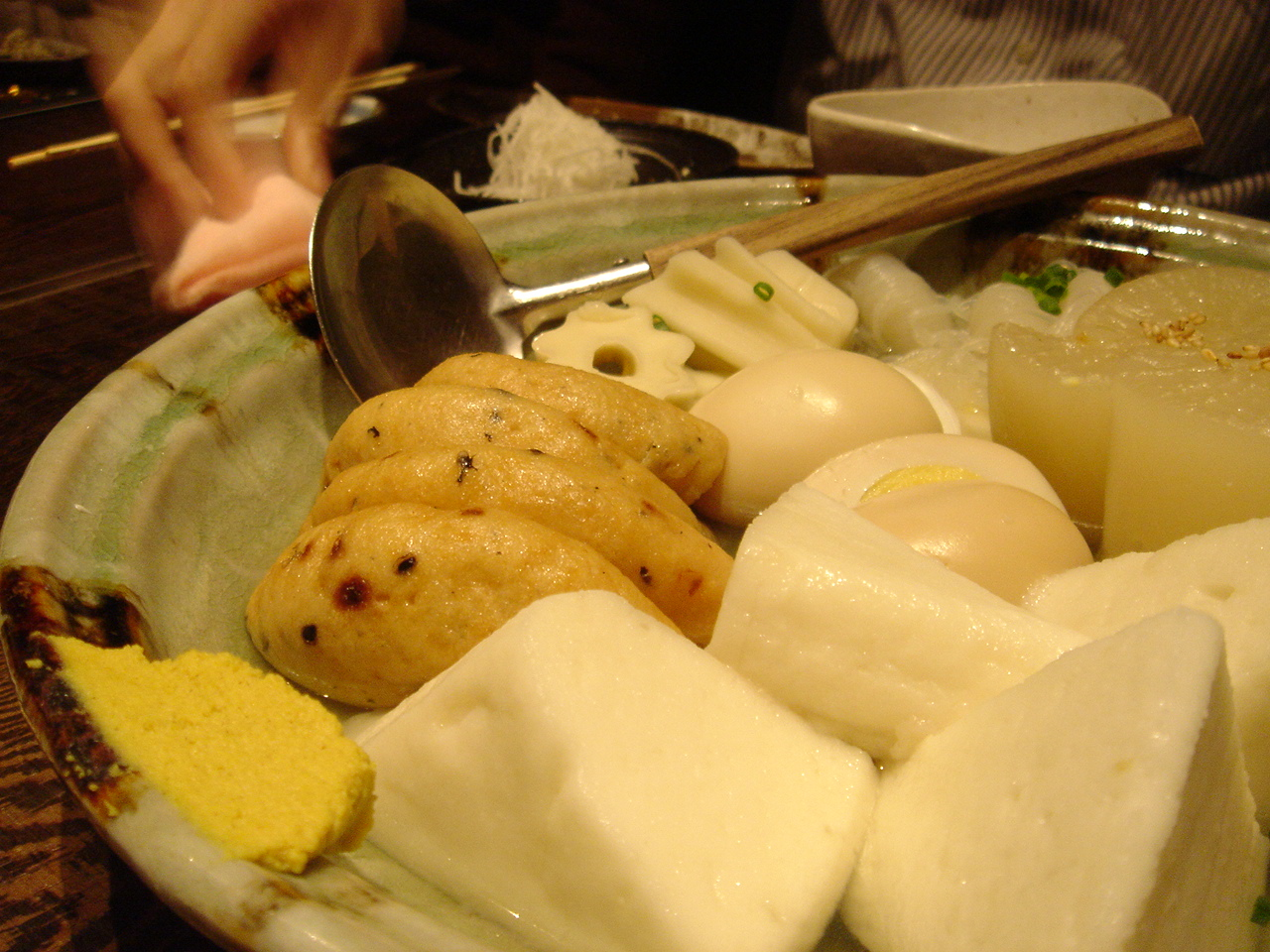
Oden with Karashi (bottom left).

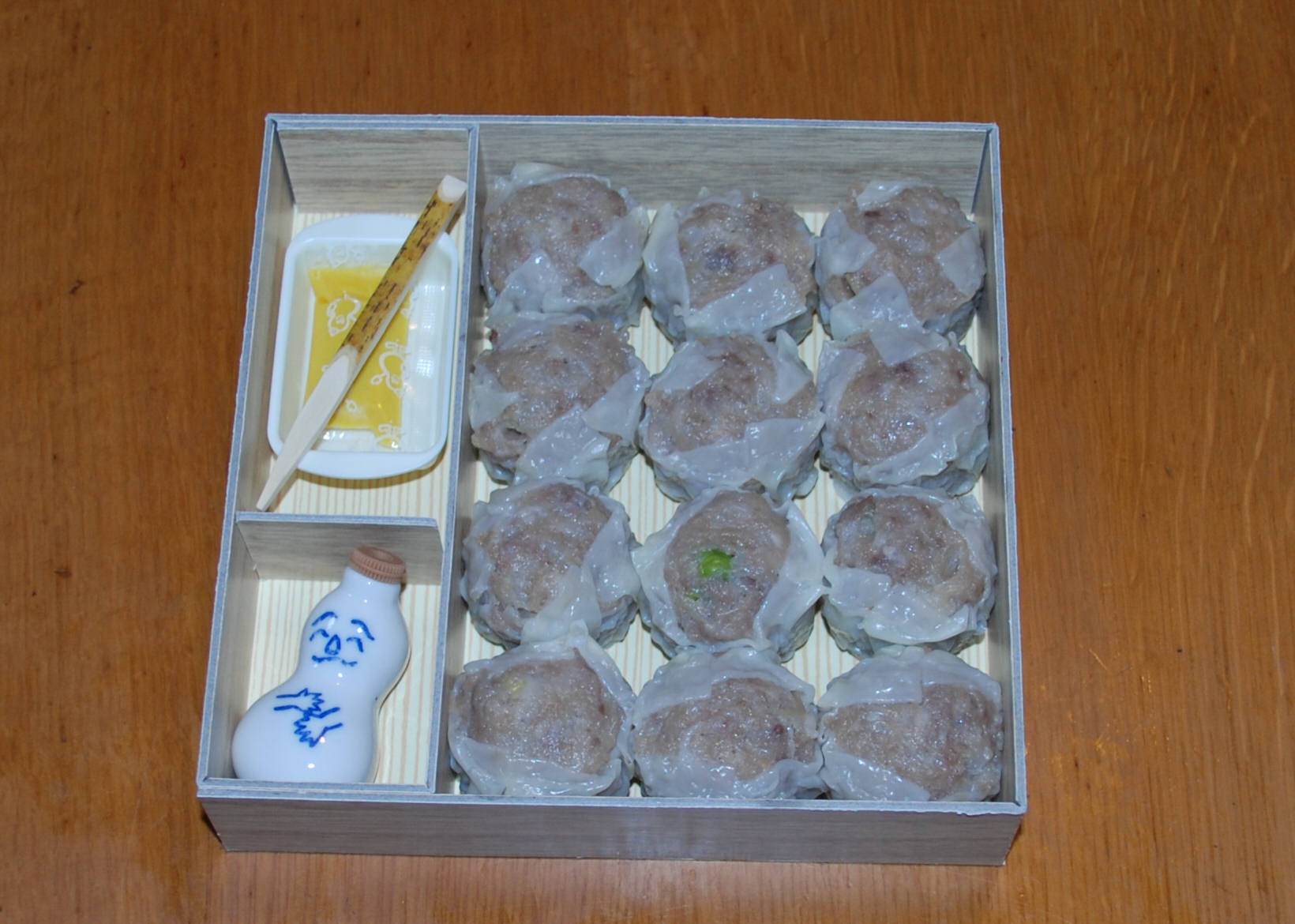
Shumai lunchbox with Karashi (upper left).

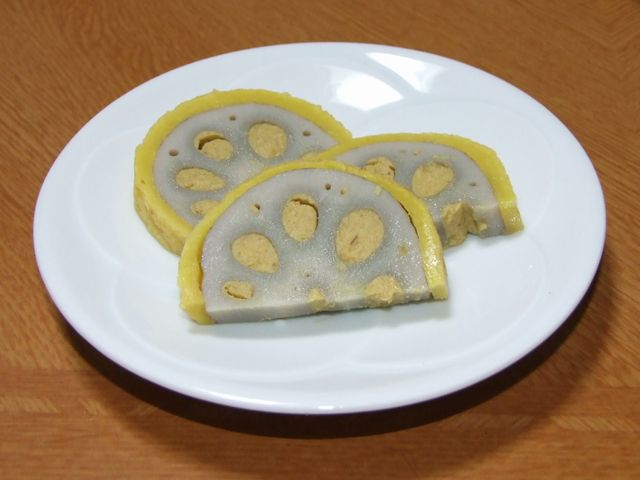
Karashi Renkon, a lotus root stuffed with Karashi-miso.
