= Chicken katsu =

Japanese fried chicken dish

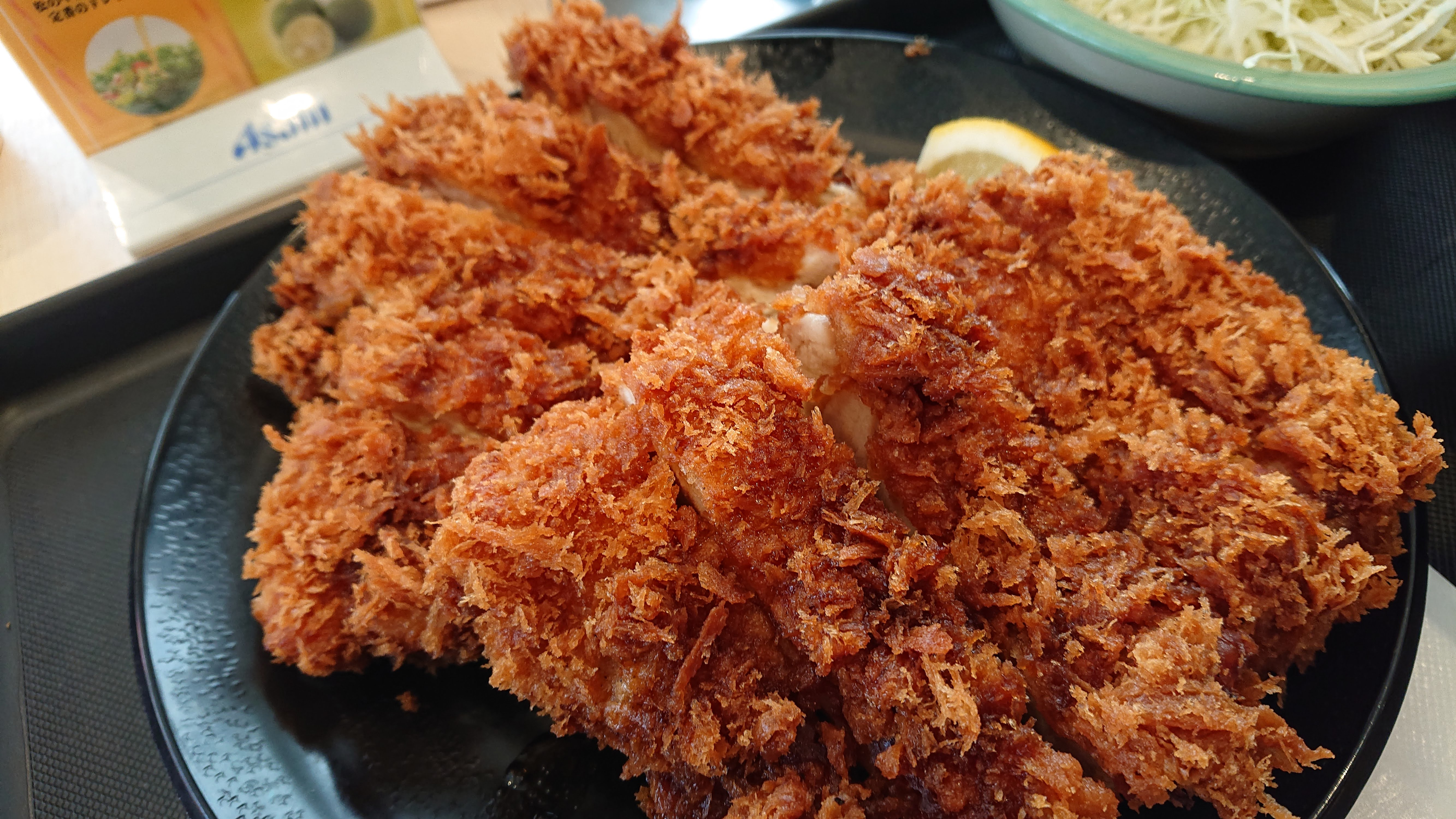
- Chicken katsu, or fried chicken cutlet
- Alternative names: Chikinkatsu
- Course: Main
- Place of origin: Japan
- Main ingredients: Fried chicken, panko Japanese rice

Chicken katsu (Japanese: チキンカツ, Hepburn: chikinkatsu), also known as panko chicken or tori katsu (鶏カツ), is a Japanese dish of fried chicken made with panko bread crumbs. It is related to tonkatsu, fried pork cutlets. The dish has spread internationally and has become a common dish served at Japanese and East Asian restaurants worldwide.

== Etymology ==
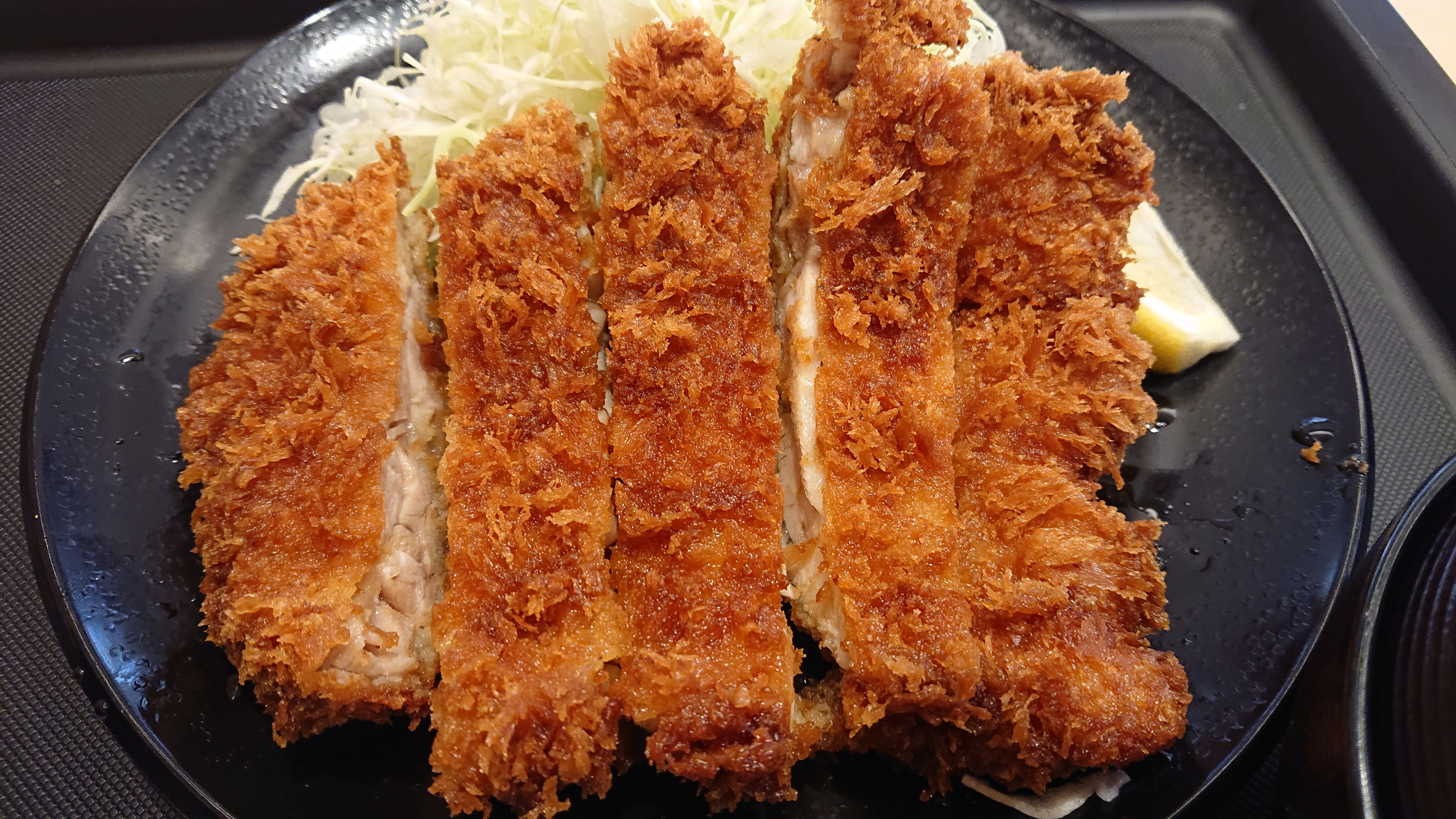
Chicken katsu from Matsunoya restaurant

Katsu (カツ) is a shortened form of katsuretsu (カツレツ), the Japanese transliteration of the English word "cutlet". The alternate name tori katsu means "bird cutlet", where "bird" refers to chicken by default in culinary contexts.

== Serving ==
Like tonkatsu, chicken katsu is generally served with tonkatsu sauce (とんかつソース), a thick Japanese vegetarian pureed fruit-based brown sauce, along with rice or miso soup as part of a two- or three-item set meal, or as dinner with rice and vegetables.

== Outside Japan ==
In Hawaii, chicken katsu is more popular than tonkatsu and substitutes for it in dishes such as katsukarē and katsudon. In a plate lunch, chicken katsu is generally served on a bed of shredded cabbage, with a well-seasoned ketchup similar to cocktail sauce.

In the United Kingdom, the word "katsu" has become synonymous with Japanese curries as a whole, owing to the rapid rise in popularity of chicken katsu curry.

== Gallery ==
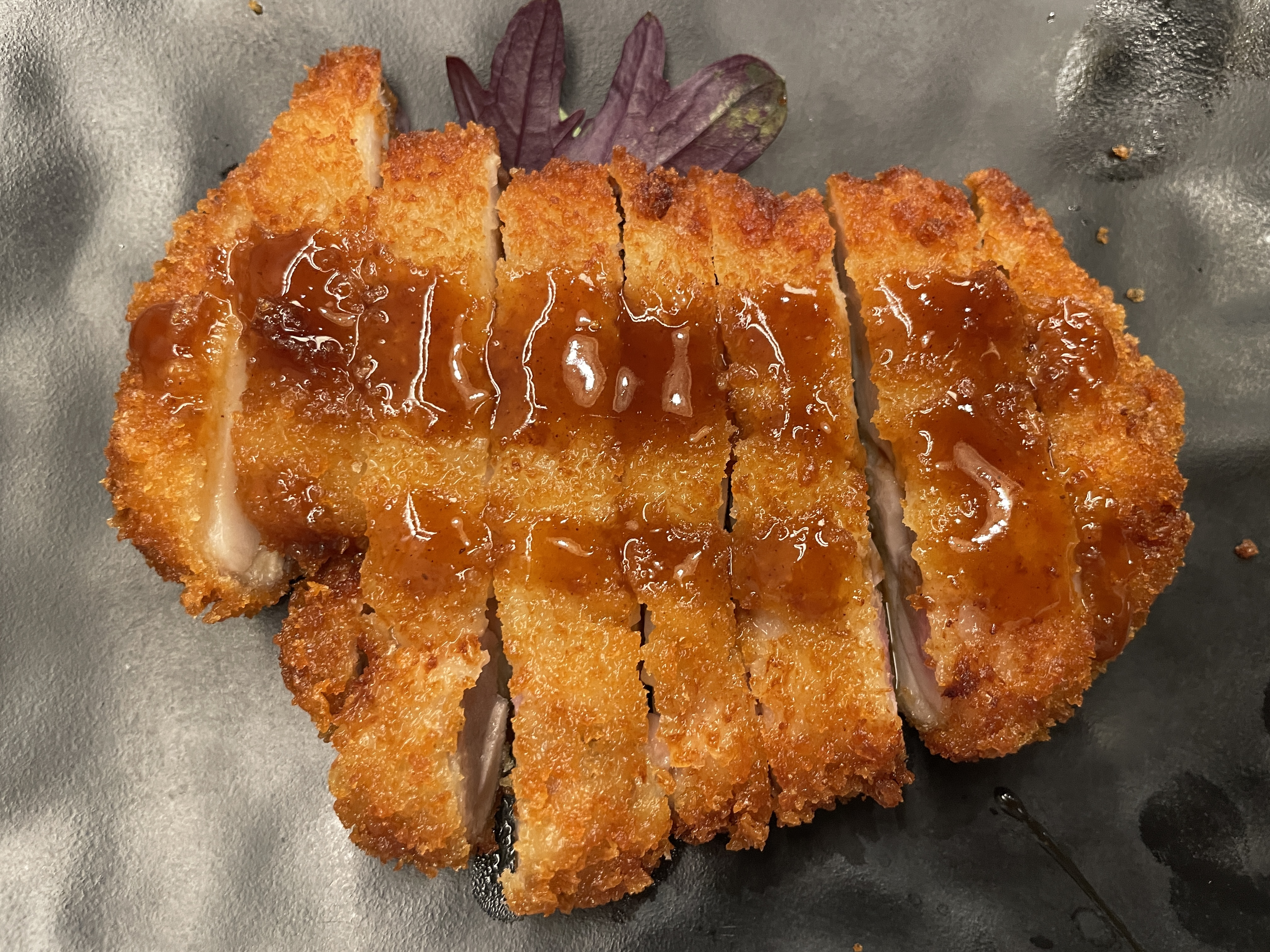

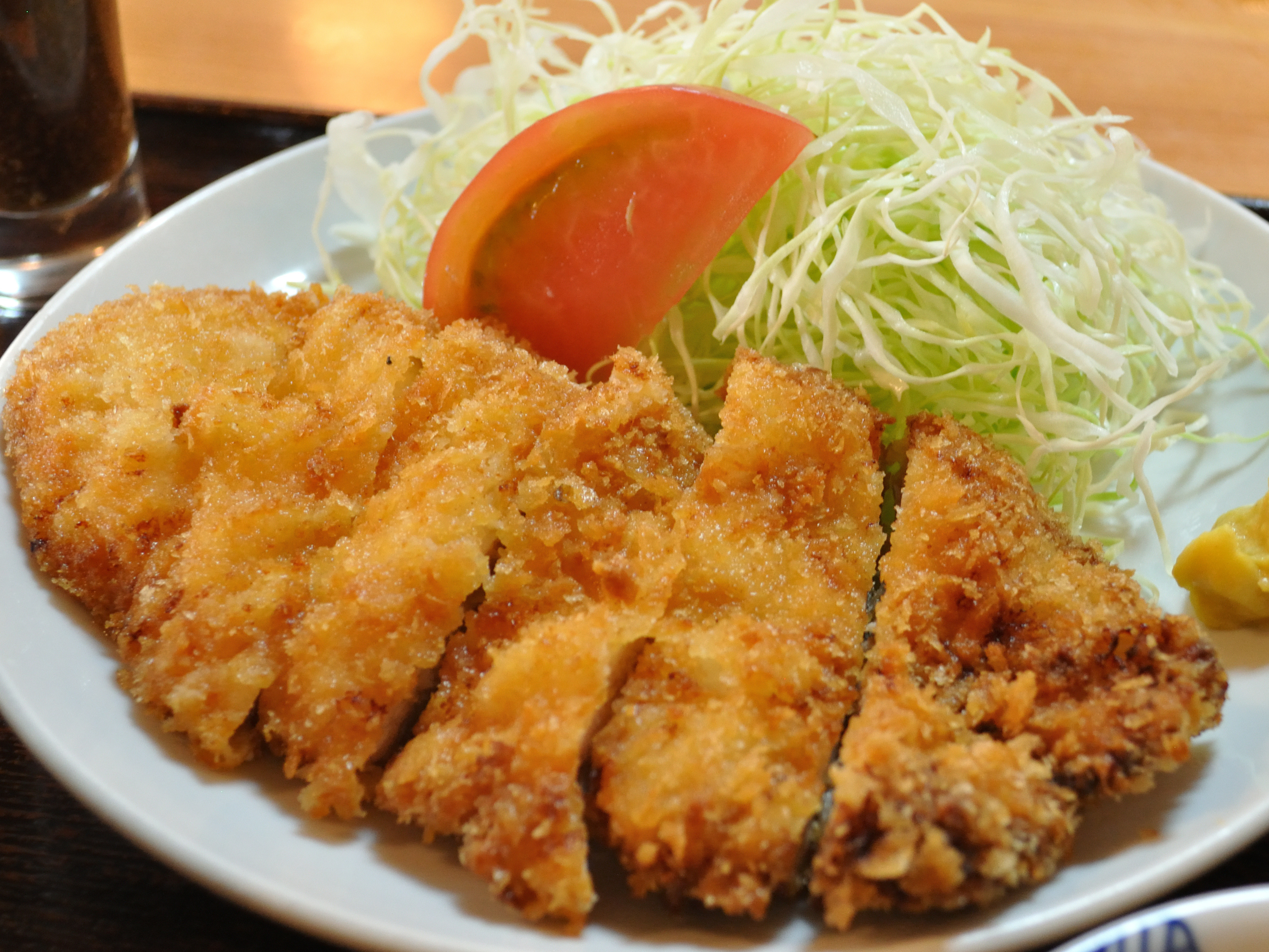

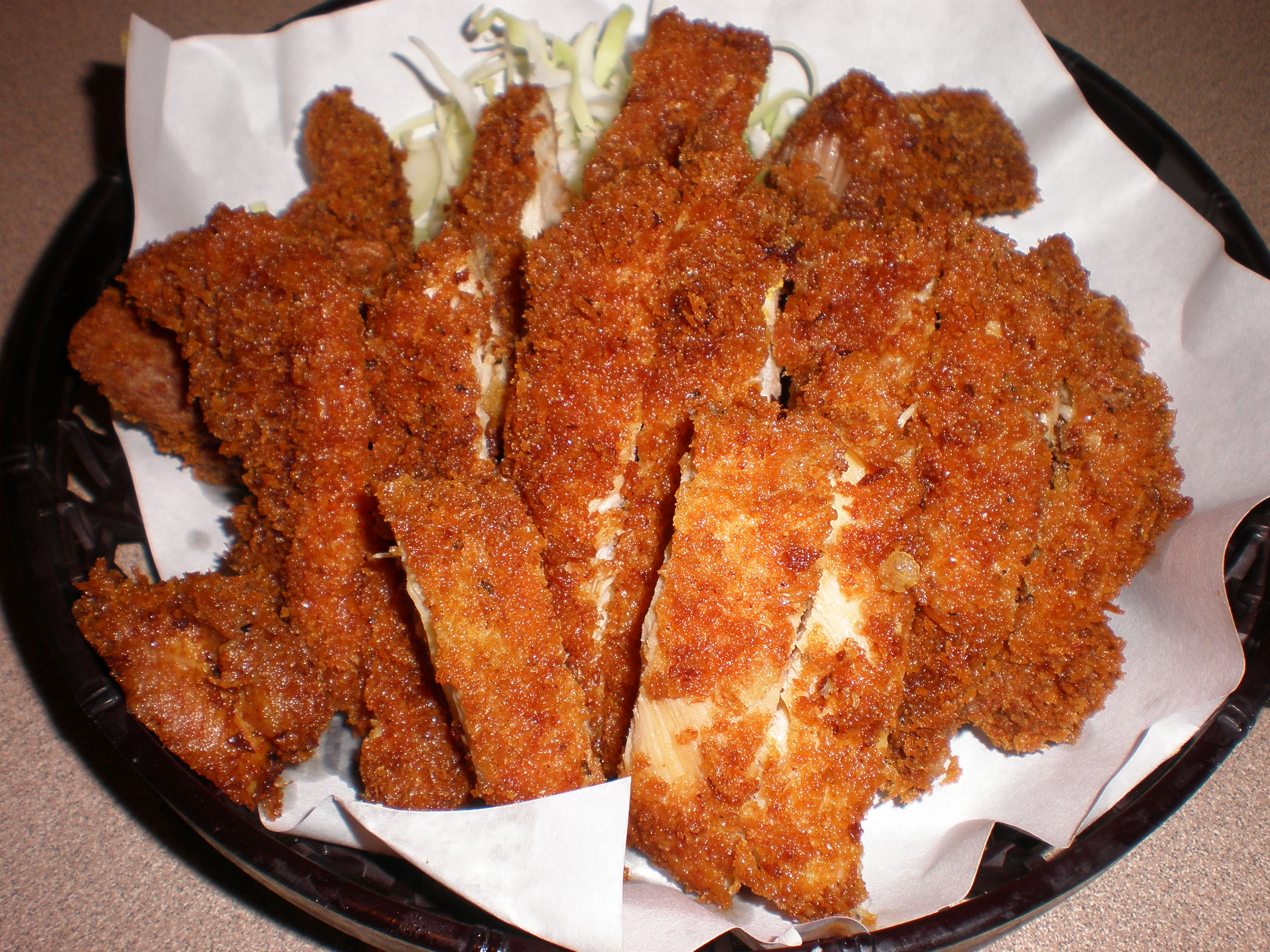

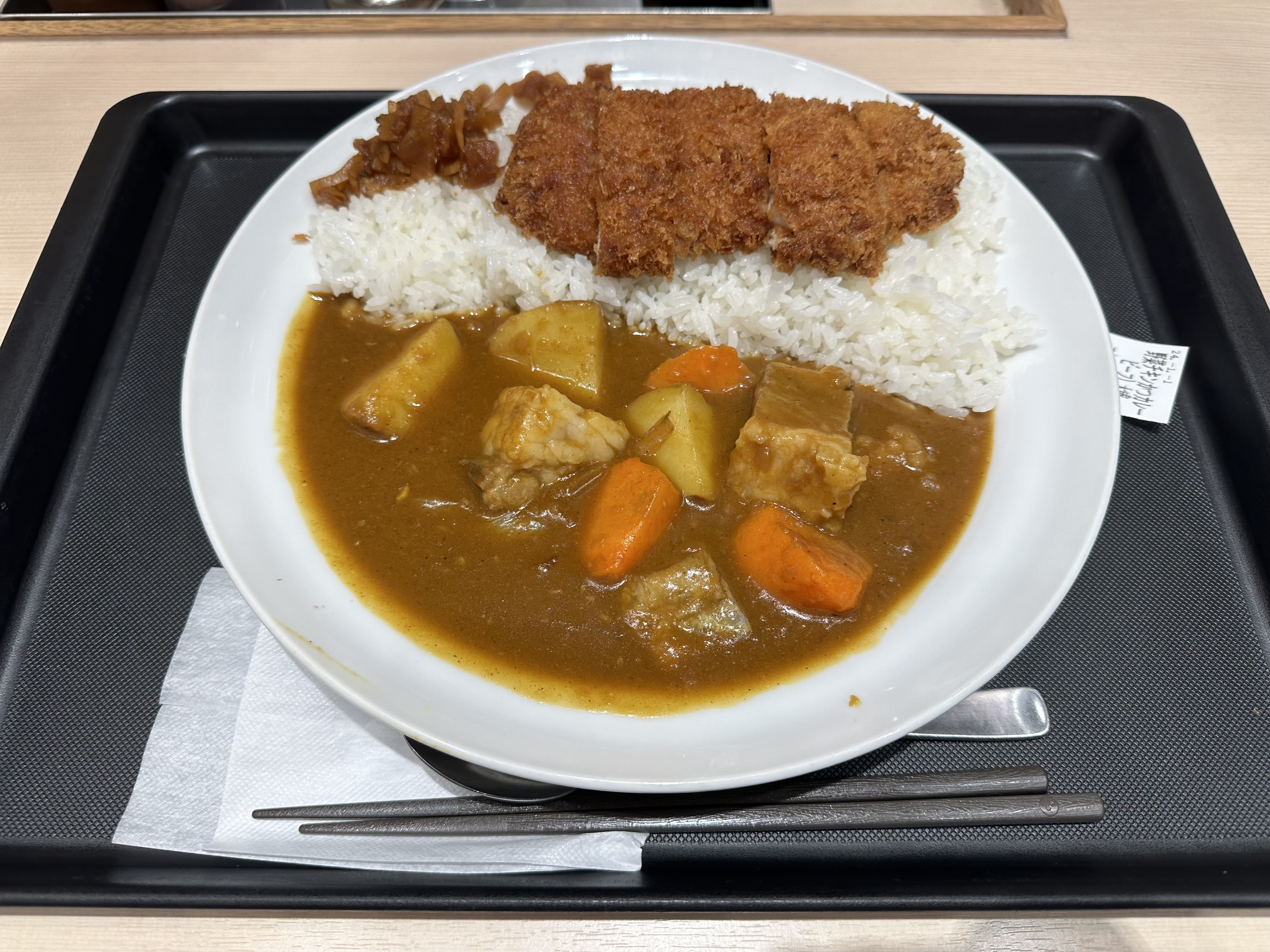
Chicken katsu curry

== See also ==
- Japanese cuisine
- List of chicken dishes
- Escalope
