= Tonkatsu sauce =

Japanese seasoning sauce

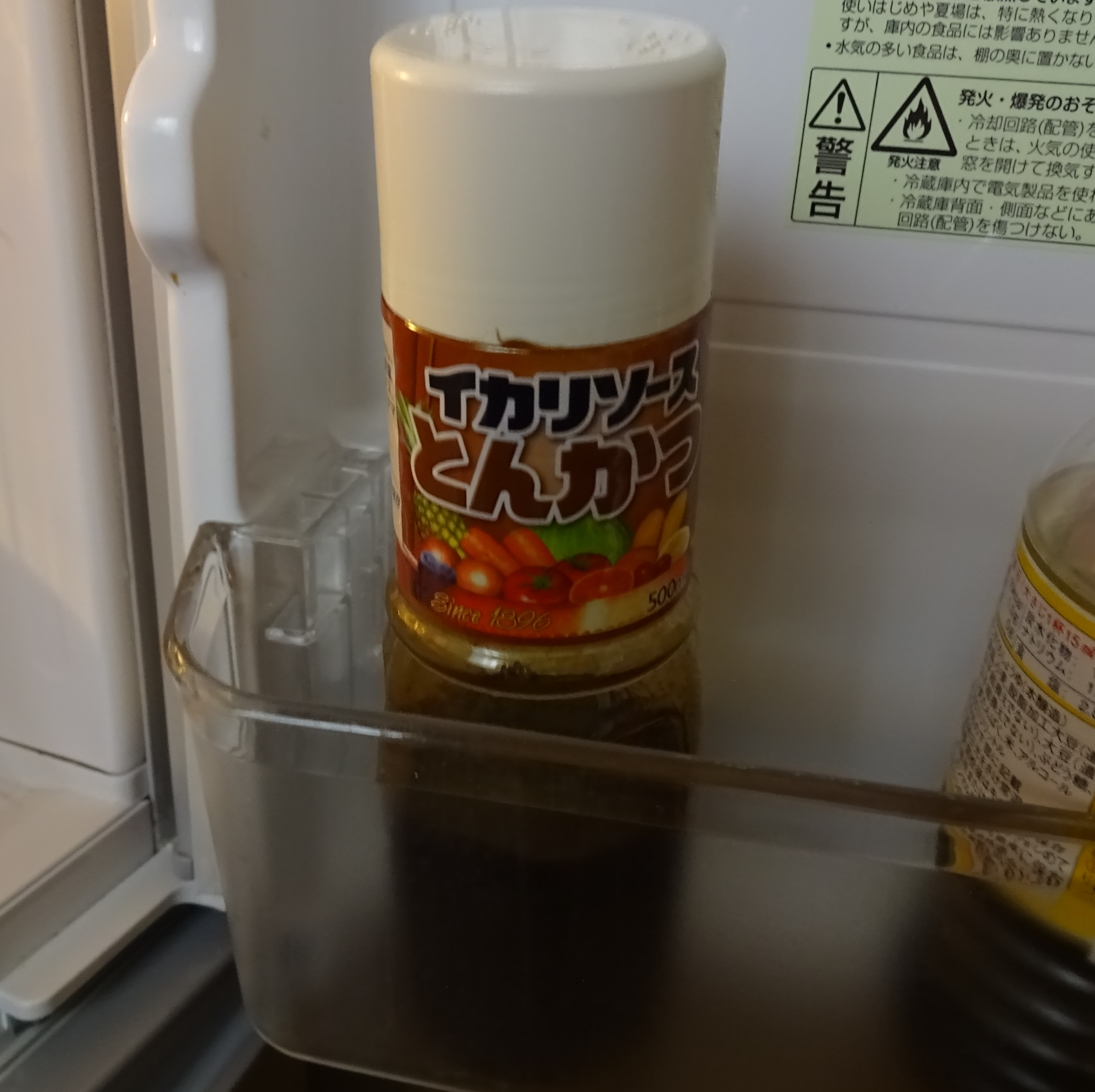
A bottle of tonkatsu sauce

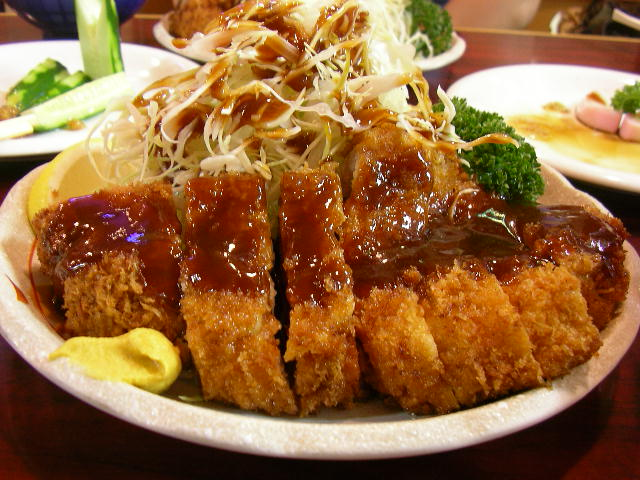
Tonkatsu with katsu sauce spread on top

Tonkatsu sauce or katsu sauce is a Japanese sauce served with tonkatsu (pork cutlet). It is a thick (viscosity over 2.0 pascal-second, per JAS Standard) Japanese Worcestershire-type sauce. It is similar to the English and Irish brown sauce, and can include a fish sauce, tomatoes, prunes, dates, apples, lemon juice, carrots, onions, and celery among its ingredients.

== History and varieties ==
The first tonkatsu sauce was made in 1948 by Oliver Sauce Co., Ltd. of Hyōgo Prefecture. The Bull-Dog brand of tonkatsu sauce, for example, is made from malt vinegar, yeast, and vegetable and fruit purees, pastes, and extracts. In the United States, Kikkoman brand sells a fruity tonkatsu sauce with applesauce as the main ingredient.

== See also ==
- Soy sauce
- Tare sauce
- Japanese mayonnaise
- Japanese Worcester sauce
