= Restaurant to Another World =

Japanese light novel series

- First light novel volume cover, featuring Aletta

異世界食堂 (Isekai Shokudō)
- Genre: Cooking; Fantasy; Reverse isekai
- Novel series
- Written by: Junpei Inuzuka
- Published by: Shōsetsuka ni Narō
- Original run: January 4, 2013 – present
- Light novel
- Written by: Junpei Inuzuka
- Illustrated by: Katsumi Enami
- Published by: Shufunotomo
- English publisher: NA: Seven Seas Entertainment
- Imprint: Hero Bunko
- Original run: February 28, 2015 – present
- Volumes: 6
- Manga
- Written by: Junpei Inuzuka
- Illustrated by: Takaaki Kugatsu
- Published by: Square Enix
- English publisher: NA: Yen Press; Crunchyroll (digital)
- Magazine: Young Gangan
- Original run: November 18, 2016 – June 25, 2019
- Volumes: 4
- Anime television series
- Directed by: Masato Jinbo
- Produced by: Full list: Mirai Yamauchi; Nobuhiko Kurosu; Masao Fukuda (1–12); Takaya Ibira (1–12); Ryouichi Ishibashi (1–12); Hideki Takahara (1–12); Hiroyuki Tanaka (1–12); Takashi Katou (1–12); Aya Iizuka (13–24); Shousei Itou (13–24); Motoo Kawabata (13–24); Souji Miyagi (13-24); Shuuichi Motohashi (13–24); Akihiko Okada (13–24); Aoi Taniguchi (13–24); Kento Yoshida (13–24); Hideki Kama (13–24)
- Written by: Masato Jinbo
- Music by: Miho Tsujibayashi; Tomisiro
- Studio: Silver Link (1–12); OLM Team Yoshioka (13–24)
- Licensed by: Crunchyroll
- Original network: TV Tokyo, TV Osaka, AT-X, TXN
- English network: SEA: Aniplus Asia
- Original run: July 4, 2017 – December 18, 2021
- Episodes: 24
- Manga

Isekai Shokudō: Yōshoku no Nekoya
- Written by: Junpei Inuzuka
- Illustrated by: Morozawa Yamizawa
- Published by: Kadokawa Shoten
- Magazine: Monthly Shōnen Ace
- Original run: April 26, 2021 – present
- Volumes: 10
- icon

Restaurant to Another World (Japanese: 異世界食堂, Hepburn: Isekai Shokudō) is a Japanese light novel series written by Junpei Inuzuka, with illustrations by Katsumi Enami. Shufunotomo have released six volumes of the series since February 2015. An anime television series adaptation produced by Silver Link aired from July to September 2017. A second season by OLM aired from October to December 2021.

== Plot ==
The Western Restaurant Nekoya (Note: 洋食のねこや, Yōshoku no Nekoya) is a restaurant situated in an ordinary corner of an undisclosed Tokyo shopping district, offering a large number of Japanese versions of Western dishes. It opens during usual business hours but is closed during holidays and weekends; its usual clientele is the working class of the city. However, it is also technically open on Saturdays, when it creates doorways to another world inhabited by elves, dragons, beastmen and other fantastic creatures, who enter the restaurant and partake of its exotic food, with many of them becoming regular patrons.

== Media ==
=== Light novel ===
The web novel was initially serialized by Junpei Inuzuka on the user-generated content site Shōsetsuka ni Narō from January 4, 2013, onwards. Following the web novel's publication, Shufunotomo acquired the series for print publication. The first light novel volume, with illustrations by Katsumi Enami, was published on February 28, 2015, under their Hero Bunko imprint. As of October 2021, six volumes have been published. Seven Seas Entertainment has licensed the novel.

==== Volumes ====
No.	Original release date	Original ISBN	English release date	English ISBN
1	February 28, 2015	978-4-07-411329-3	June 18, 2019	978-1-642753-27-1
2	July 29, 2015	978-4-07-402158-1	September 17, 2019	978-1-642756-84-5
3	September 30, 2016	978-4-07-420009-2	December 17, 2019	978-1-642757-38-5
4	June 30, 2017	978-4-07-426242-7	December 29, 2020	978-1-64505-213-5
5	March 30, 2019	978-4-07-437234-8	January 26, 2021	978-1-64505-724-6
6	October 29, 2021	978-4-07-449740-9	December 02, 2025	978-1-63858-855-9

=== Manga ===
A manga adaptation illustrated by Takaaki Kugatsu launched in Square Enix's Young Gangan magazine in November 2016 and ended in June 2019. The manga shares the same first chapter about menchikatsu as the original web novel, but the second chapter is different. Crunchyroll published the manga digitally in English beginning on July 2, 2017. The manga is also licensed by Yen Press.

A second manga adaptation by Morozawa Yamizawa titled Isekai Shokudō: Yōshoku no Nekoya (異世界食堂 ～洋食のねこや～, "Restaurant to Another World: Western Cuisine Nekoya") began serialization in Kadokawa Shoten's Monthly Shōnen Ace magazine on April 26, 2021.

==== First series ====
No.	Original release date	Original ISBN	English release date	English ISBN
1	June 24, 2017	978-4-7575-5391-0	June 23, 2020	978-1-9753-0903-9
2	September 25, 2017	978-4-7575-5485-6	October 27, 2020	978-1-9753-0903-9
3	July 25, 2018	978-4-7575-5765-9	December 1, 2020	978-1-9753-0909-1
4	June 25, 2019	978-4-7575-6081-9	February 23, 2021	978-1-9753-0912-1

==== Second series ====
No.	Original release date	Original ISBN	English release date	English ISBN
1	September 25, 2021	978-4-0411-1839-9	—	—
2	April 26, 2022	978-4-0411-2558-8	—	—
3	November 25, 2022	978-4-0411-3176-3	—	—
4	March 25, 2023	978-4-0411-3526-6	—	—
5	October 26, 2023	978-4-0411-4251-6	—	—
6	June 25, 2024	978-4-0411-5050-4	—	—
7	December 25, 2024	978-4-0411-5819-7	—	—
8	July 26, 2025	978-4-0411-6406-8	—	—
9	February 25, 2026	978-4-0411-7163-9	—	—
10	September 25, 2026	978-4-0411-7760-0	—	—

=== Anime ===
The author reported in a September 7, 2016, blog entry on the Shōsetsuka ni Narō website that an anime adaptation project of the light novel series was in the works, later revealed to be an anime television series. The series aired from July 4 to September 19, 2017, on TV Tokyo, and was streamed with subtitles by Crunchyroll and with an English dub done by Funimation. Masato Jinbo directed the series and supervised scripts at Silver Link, with Takao Sano and Keiichi Sano adapted the original character designs for animation. The opening theme is "One in a Billion" by Wake Up, May'n, while the ending theme is "Chiisana Hitotsubu" (ちいさなひとつぶ; "A Small Grain") by Kiyono Yasuno.

On April 22, 2021, it was announced on the cover of the Monthly Shōnen Ace magazine's June 2021 issue that a second season had been greenlit for production. OLM animated the second season, and Yasukazu Shoji replaced Keiichi Sano and Takao Sano as the character designer. The rest of the staff and cast members returned to reprise their roles from the first season. The second season aired from October 2 to December 18, 2021. The opening theme is "Onnaji Kimochi" by Kiyono Yasuno, while the ending theme is "Samenai Mahō" by Nao Tōyama.

==== Episodes ====
===== Restaurant to Another World =====
No. overall	No. in season	Title	Directed by	Storyboarded by	Original release date
1	1	"Beef Stew"; Transliteration: "Bīfu Shichū" (Japanese: ビーフシチュー)	Yūta Takamura	Hiroyuki Shimazu	July 4, 2017
1	1	"Breakfast Special"; Transliteration: "Mōningu" (Japanese: モーニング)	Yūta Takamura	Hiroyuki Shimazu	July 4, 2017
A Japanese chef runs the Nekoya, a Western-style restaurant that connects to another world one day every week, bringing around all kinds of customers ranging from wizards and warriors to beastmen and dragons. One morning, the owner discovers a homeless demon girl named Aletta had wandered into his restaurant after coming across one of the Nekoya's interdimensional doors. She explains that she had come to the royal capital to make a living as a human, but lost her job after she was discovered to be a demon. After treating her to a staff breakfast, the owner offers Aletta a once-a-week part-time job as a waitress in the Nekoya. Learning about the new addition to the Nekoya's staff, "Red Queen", a dragon lord and regular patron who considers the restaurant and staff part of her personal treasure, casts a spell to protect Aletta.
2	2	"Minced Meat Cutlet"; Transliteration: "Menchi Katsu" (Japanese: メンチカツ)	Jun'ya Koshiba	Katsuyuki Kodera	July 11, 2017
2	2	"Fried Shrimp"; Transliteration: "Ebi Furai" (Japanese: エビフライ)	Jun'ya Koshiba	Katsuyuki Kodera	July 11, 2017
Following the diary entries of her late great grandfather William, treasure hunter Sarah Gold goes searching in an abandoned mine for clues on "The Day of Satur" and discovers a door to the Nekoya. Sarah tries out the daily special, minced meat cutlet, finding it exquisite. In another part of the other world, Tatsugorou visits a knight named Heinrich Seeleman to deliver a sword he had left behind three years ago, when Heinrich first discovered the Nekoya. Having gone through the desert for a day without food, Heinrich was awed by the restaurant's fried shrimp and gave the owner his sword as a collateral for the meal's payment. The energy from the food allowed Heinrich to warn his nation about the need for reinforcement in a territory being attacked by Mothmen, but he was unable to find the Nekoya afterwards. Happy to learn from Tatsugorou that his encounter wasn't a dream, Heinrich once again returns to the Nekoya for another helping of fried shrimp.
3	3	"Spaghetti with Meat Sauce"; Transliteration: "Mīto Sōsu" (Japanese: ミートソース)	Shirō Izumi	Hiroyuki Shimazu	July 18, 2017
3	3	"Chocolate Parfait"; Transliteration: "Chokorēto Pafe" (Japanese: チョコレートパフェ)	Shirō Izumi	Hiroyuki Shimazu	July 18, 2017
Thomas Alfade, who has founded a successful pasta company in his world, takes his grandson and successor Sirius with him to the Nekoya to do some business. Upon trying the restaurant's spaghetti with meat sauce, Sirius learns that all the pasta and sauces that have made the Alfade company famous are actually mere imitations of the Nekoya's menu. Later, Adelheid, a sickly princess who once went to the Nekoya with her late grandfather Wilheim, once again discovers the door to the Nekoya. There, she tries the "clouds" she had tried as a child (a chocolate parfait), filling her with memories of her grandfather.
4	4	"Omelette Rice"; Transliteration: "Omuraisu" (Japanese: オムライス)	Jun Fukuta	Takashi Watanabe	July 25, 2017
4	4	"Tofu Steak"; Transliteration: "Tōfu Sutēki" (Japanese: トーフステーキ)	Jun Fukuta	Takashi Watanabe	July 25, 2017
Gaganpo, a lizardman of the Blue Tail Tribe, is the chosen hero sent by his tribe to pick up takeaway orders of the Nekoya's omurice, while also enjoying a few dishes for himself. Later, an elf named Fardania, while searching for something delicious for her late mother's anniversary, comes across the Nekoya's door. As Fardania finds nothing on the menu that is suitable for her vegan diet, the owner makes her a tofu steak that is free of any meat or dairy while still remaining very delicious. Wowed by the food, Fardania becomes determined to make even better cuisine than the owner.
5	5	"Pork Cutlet Rice Bowl"; Transliteration: "Katsudon" (Japanese: カツ丼)	Michael Tanaka	Masayoshi Nishida	August 1, 2017
5	5	"Pudding a la Mode"; Transliteration: "Purin a ra Mōdo" (Japanese: プリンアラモード)	Michael Tanaka	Masayoshi Nishida	August 1, 2017
The owner tells the story of Lionel, a lion man who was captured by Alexander the half-elf and forced to become a slave in a gladiator arena. One day, the Nekoya's door appeared in Lionel's cell and he met the owner's grandfather, who served him katsudon despite Lionel not having any money. Given strength by the katsudon, Lionel became renewed with vigor to fight in the arena in order to earn money to pay off his tab. Later, it is revealed the desserts menu for the Nekoya was written by a half-elf princess named Victoria, who comes to the restaurant for some pudding a la mode.
6	6	"Sandwiches"; Transliteration: "Sandoitchi" (Japanese: サンドイッチ)	Yūshi Ibe	Takashi Watanabe	August 8, 2017
6	6	"Steamed Potato With Butter"; Transliteration: "Jaga Batā" (Japanese: じゃがバター)	Yūshi Ibe	Takashi Watanabe	August 8, 2017
Noticing that Aletta is not too fond of potatoes, as she only really eats them to survive during the week, the owner offers to teach her a good way of preparing them. Meanwhile, Sarah and Heinrich get into an argument about which of their favorite dishes tastes better as a sandwich, which the other customers soon get involved in and escalates into each one of them getting a sandwich of their contradictor's favorite dish. After a busy day of dealing with rush orders of sandwiches, the owner shows Aletta how to make steamed potatoes topped with butter, quickly turning potatoes into her favorite food.
7	7	"Curry Rice"; Transliteration: "Karē Raisu" (Japanese: カレーライス)	Yūta Takamura	Yūichi Nihei	August 15, 2017
7	7	"Chicken Curry"; Transliteration: "Chikin Karē" (Japanese: チキンカレー)	Yūta Takamura	Yūichi Nihei	August 15, 2017
Alphonse Flügel, an admiral of the Duchy of Samanark, became a regular of the Nekoya while shipwrecked on a remote island for twenty years. Three months after he is rescued, Alphonse manages to find another door to the Nekoya and once again gets to savour his favorite dish, curry rice. Meanwhile, "Kuro", the black dragon of death who had banished herself to the moon to avoid inadvertently killing innocent lives, discovers a door to the Nekoya just as Alphonse is asked to sample the owner's newest dish, chicken curry. As "Kuro" becomes addicted to the chicken curry and orders excessive quantities of it, "Red Queen" informs her that she needs money to pay for the food. Thus, "Red Queen" asks the owner to hire "Kuro" as an additional waitress to pay off her accumulated bill.
8	8	"Hamburg Steak"; Transliteration: "Hanbāgu" (Japanese: ハンバーグ)	Hidehiko Kadota	Katsuyuki Kodera	August 22, 2017
8	8	"Assorted Cookies"; Transliteration: "Kukkī Asōto" (Japanese: クッキーアソート)	Hidehiko Kadota	Katsuyuki Kodera	August 22, 2017
A young fisherman named Roukei is rescued by the mermaid Arte, and as repayment for his life, Arte asks him to take her out to the Nekoya, where they both come to enjoy the restaurant's Hamburg steaks and each other's company. In the meantime, Aletta finds an additional steady job as a housekeeper at Sarah Gold's residence, where she meets Sarah's younger sister Shia when the latter drops by to look after Sarah. After sampling some exquisite cookies the Master has given Aletta as a present, Shia becomes so enamored with them that she asks Aletta to bring her more whenever she can, which she does in an after-credit scene.
9	9	"Fried Seafood"; Transliteration: "Shīfūdo Furai" (Japanese: シーフードフライ)	Shirō Izumi	Hiroyuki Shimazu	August 29, 2017
9	9	"Melon Soda Float"; Transliteration: "Kurīmu Sōda" (Japanese: クリームソーダ)	Shirō Izumi	Hiroyuki Shimazu	August 29, 2017
A dwarf named Guilhem takes his skeptical friend Gard to visit the Nekoya for the first time, in order to enjoy several large portions of seafood (an exotic delicacy for mountain-dwellers like them) and alcoholic beverages together. This inspires them to establish a way station for travelers, in which they reside, in order to visit the restaurant regularly. The second part of the episode introduces two more Nekoya regulars from the Western Continent's Land of Sand, Prince Shareef and his half-sister Renner. Shareef's primary reason for visiting the restaurant is because he has fallen in love with Adelheid, but is too shy to properly confess his feelings to her.
10	10	"Crêpes"; Transliteration: "Kurēpu" (Japanese: クレープ)	Jun'ya Koshiba	Masayoshi Nishida	September 5, 2017
10	10	"Natto Spaghetti"; Transliteration: "Nattō Supa" (Japanese: 納豆スパ)	Jun'ya Koshiba	Masayoshi Nishida	September 5, 2017
One day, the Nekoya's inter-dimensional door appears in the Land of Flowers, a domain inhabited by fairies. Eager to find out what lies beyond, fairy queen Tiana Silvario and a group of her subjects enter the restaurant, where Princess Victoria introduces them to its mixed fruit crêpes; this results in the fairies becoming quite ecstatic about the Nekoya fruit desserts. In the meantime, Fardania seeks out Christian, a friend of her father's, who reveals to her that he has taken an interest in blending human food production into the Elven way of life after his own visit to the Nekoya ten years ago. They visit the restaurant together, where Christian treats Fardania to a helping of natto spaghetti and Fardania invents a new combination of nattō and rice. After learning that rice also exists on the Western Continent, Fardania decides to embark on a journey in order to expand her culinary horizons.
11	11	"Carpaccio"; Transliteration: "Karupatcho" (Japanese: カルパッチョ)	Masato Jinbo	Takashi Watanabe	September 12, 2017
11	11	"Curry Bun"; Transliteration: "Karē Pan" (Japanese: カレーパン)	Masato Jinbo	Takashi Watanabe	September 12, 2017
An adolescent Siren, Iris, drags her friend Arius into a daredevil adventure on the very island where Alphonse Flügel was stranded until recently. Following a note Alphonse left behind, they come across the Nekoya door and enter the restaurant, and since they can only eat raw fish, the Master serves them fish carpaccio. Later, the Master prepares a helping of extra curry buns he has received from an acquaintance, which he shares with "Kuro" and Aletta. During the course of the meal, "Kuro" reflects on her usually lonely life and how much it was changed by her work at the Nekoya, and begins to open up to her co-workers by conversing with them verbally.
12	12	"Pork Soup"; Transliteration: "Tonjiru" (Japanese: とん汁)	Yūta Takamura	Yūichi Nihei	September 19, 2017
12	12	"Croquettes"; Transliteration: "Korokke" (Japanese: コロッケ)	Yūta Takamura	Yūichi Nihei	September 19, 2017
For the occasion of Meat Day (二九の日, niku no hi), the Master serves free pork soup with the regular meals, which quickly gains the praise of the guests. At the same time, Alexander the half-elf visits his old friend, the sage Altorius, because he has decided to pay the Nekoya a visit to try out the croquettes which his late son, Emperor Wilhelm, enjoyed so much. He learns to his surprise that Yomi, his lost comrade-in-arms, was not killed in their battle against the demon god, but wound up on Earth and that the current Master is her grandson. Moved by the sentiment of this, he pays a visit to his family's graves and is greeted by his great-granddaughter, Princess Adelheid, who is also visiting her family's graves. In an after-credit scene, the Nekoya door appears anew in a lush grass field, waiting for the next guest to step through.

===== Restaurant to Another World 2 =====
No. overall	No. in season	Title	Directed by (Note: Information is taken from the ending credits of each episode.)	Storyboarded by	Original release date
13	1	"Cheesecake"; Transliteration: "Chīzukēki" (Japanese: チーズケーキ)	Norio Nitta	Norio Nitta	October 2, 2021 (Note: This episode aired at 1:38 a.m. JST, 15 minutes after the original air time on TV Tokyo.)
13	1	"Breakfast Again"; Transliteration: "Mōningu Futatabi" (Japanese: モーニング再び)	Norio Nitta	Norio Nitta	October 2, 2021
While eliminating a band of goblins, demon bounty hunter Hilda chances upon a Nekoya door and thus becomes one of the restaurant's regulars for its soufflé cheesecake. After the day's work is finished, the Master gives Aletta a portion of corn potage and mince meat cutlet sandwich before she returns home to Sarah Gold's house, enabling Aletta and Sarah to share a hearty breakfast together.
14	2	"Beefsteak"; Transliteration: "Bifuteki" (Japanese: ビフテキ)	Mayu Numayama	Jōji Shimura	October 9, 2021
14	2	"Cream Puff"; Transliteration: "Shū Kurīmu" (Japanese: シュークリーム)	Mayu Numayama	Jōji Shimura	October 9, 2021
On the run from her father's wrath, Juliette, a recently created vampire, and her undead love Romero flee into a cave, where a Nekoya door grants them a temporary refuge and the opportunity to taste beefsteak of a quality they have never encountered before. After another visit to the Nekoya, Adelheid invites her personal servant Hannah to a treat of cream puffs and coffee she has received there.
15	3	"Hamburger"; Transliteration: "Hanbāgā" (Japanese: ハンバーガー)	Ken'ichi Nishida	Ken'ichi Nishida	October 16, 2021
15	3	"Beef Tendon Curry"; Transliteration: "Gyū Suji Karē" (Japanese: ギュウスジカレー)	Ken'ichi Nishida	Ken'ichi Nishida	October 16, 2021
Jack, Kento and Terry, three juvenile boys and best friends from a town in the Empire, regularly visit the Nekoya through their personal secret entrance to partake in its hamburger menu; the restaurant's extremely diverse clientele inspires them to become adventurers and explore the world once they come of age. After the rest of the day's customers are gone, Alphonse Flügel encourages Aletta and Kuro to participate in a trial of the Master's latest curry dish variants.
16	4	"Children's Lunch"; Transliteration: "Okosama Ranchi" (Japanese: お子様ランチ)	Takahiro Hirata	Mayu Hirotomi; Takahiro Hirata	October 23, 2021
16	4	"Cream Croquette"; Transliteration: "Kurīmu Korokke" (Japanese: クリームコロッケ)	Takahiro Hirata	Mayu Hirotomi; Takahiro Hirata	October 23, 2021
Despite their mother's warnings, Alfred and Margarete, the Prince and Princess of the Samanark Duchy, sneak into the tower abode of the castle's dreaded witch, only to discover that it is their aunt Victoria, who invites them to the Nekoya for lunch. After making a major sale with their special dish, the wandering halfling cooks Pikke and Pakke make their way to a Nekoya door, the source of their success, and enjoy a serving of cream croquette.
17	5	"Scotch Egg"; Transliteration: "Sukotchi Eggu" (Japanese: スコッチエッグ)	Sayaka Yamai	Norio Nitta	October 30, 2021
17	5	"Mont Blanc"; Transliteration: "Mon Buran" (Japanese: モンブラン)	Sayaka Yamai	Norio Nitta	October 30, 2021
Emilio, a young man who has suffered harassment all his life due to his unusually feminine appearance, leaves his home village to make himself more masculine, but instead is taken in by Lucia, a lamia priestess, and invited to a meal of Scotch eggs at Nekoya. Later on, the Master and his friend, the owner of the Flying Puppy confectionery, discuss the "replacement" for a past regular: Thomas the Searcher, a Demon Kingdom adventurer and tracker, who was hired by a noblewoman to find out where her old head maid, who recently passed away, has had access to the mysterious "Mont Blanc" dessert she'd occasionally serve, and thus found his way into the Nekoya.
18	6	"Rice Burger"; Transliteration: "Raisu Bāgā" (Japanese: ライスバーガー)	Hideki Takeda	Sayaka Yamai	November 6, 2021
18	6	"Pizza"; Transliteration: "Piza" (Japanese: ピザ)	Hideki Takeda	Sayaka Yamai	November 6, 2021
During her culinary training journey, Fardania encounters and takes in Alice, a young full-blood elf changeling born to two half-elves who was abandoned in the woods after her parents had died. The next morning, a Nekoya door opens at their campsite, and since it is still early, the Master improvises a meal of rice burger for his two elven guests. Thinking of ways to expand his company's variety of dishes, Sirius Alfade lets his personal chef, Johnathan Winsberg, in on the Nekoya's secret, and they find their inspiration in the pizza dish they are being served.
19	7	"Okonomiyaki"; Transliteration: "Okonomiyaki" (Japanese: お好み焼き)	Mayu Numayama	Tomoko Akiyama	November 13, 2021
19	7	"Green Tea Shaved Ice"; Transliteration: "Uji Kintoki" (Japanese: 宇治金時)	Mayu Numayama	Tomoko Akiyama	November 13, 2021
The first part of this episode highlights the antics of Soemon, a samurai, and Doshun, a diviner, both inhabitants from two rivalling Western Continent nations. While the two start hurling insults as soon as they see each other, their interaction undergoes a drastic change once they are served their mutually beloved dish, okonomiyaki. Afterwards, a young elf magician named Ilzegant, who has been living an isolated existence on his late parents' sky island refuge, finds a Nekoya door and is served a shaved ice special, inspiring him to try and replicate the recipe.
20	8	"Roast Beef"; Transliteration: "Rōsuto Bīfu" (Japanese: ローストビーフ)	Ken'ichi Nishida	Ken'ichi Nishida	November 20, 2021
20	8	"Cheesecake Again"; Transliteration: "Chīzukēki Futatabi" (Japanese: チーズケーキ再び)	Ken'ichi Nishida	Ken'ichi Nishida	November 20, 2021
Rorona, a disciple of the "Lord of Black" ("Kuro") recently converted to vampirism, comes upon a Nekoya door while testing her new abilities and befriends fellow vampires Romero and Julietta over a meal of roast beef. At a later occasion, Hilda is followed to a Nekoya door by her demon colleagues "Fembear" Alicia and "Poison Viper" Ranija, where they begin to bond over their mutual interest in cheesecake.
21	9	"Macaroni Gratin"; Transliteration: "Makaroni Guratan" (Japanese: マカロニグラタン)	Akihiko Ōta	Masakatsu Iijima	November 27, 2021
21	9	"Fruit Jelly"; Transliteration: "Furūtsu Zerī" (Japanese: フルーツゼリー)	Akihiko Ōta	Masakatsu Iijima	November 27, 2021
Myra, the daughter of a baker whom Pikke and Pakke sold the recipe for knight stew to, is taken to Nekoya by her boyfriend Johan after he discovered the door the two halflings had used on their last visit. While visiting a port town in the Grand Duchy, Fardania and Alice meet Camilla, a mermaid priestess and Nekoya regular who imported her favorite treat from the restaurant - fruit jelly - to this world.
22	10	"Teriyaki Burger"; Transliteration: "Teriyaki Bāgā" (Japanese: テリヤキバーガー)	Hideaki Ōba	Hideaki Ōba	December 4, 2021
22	10	"Chocolate Parfait Again"; Transliteration: "Chokorēto Pafe Futatabi" (Japanese: チョコレートパフェ再び)	Hideaki Ōba	Hideaki Ōba	December 4, 2021
Jack, Kento and Terry - now novice adventurers - are saved from a tight spot by fellow Nekoya regular Tatsugoro, who invites them to the restaurant for a new dish the Master has put on the menu: Teriyaki burger. Later on, Queen Lastina, the sovereign of the Demon Kingdom, mulls over her fate as a vassal lord of the Great Empire and her distinct lack of demonic blessings. When she retires to her chambers, she is surprised to find a Nekoya door there, and upon entering the restaurant, she meets with her acquaintance Princess Adelheid, who rekindles her confidence over a shared serving of chocolate parfait.
23	11	"Quiche"; Transliteration: "Kisshu" (Japanese: キッシュ)	Sayaka Yamai	Norio Nitta	December 11, 2021
23	11	"Coffee Float"; Transliteration: "Kōhī Furōto" (Japanese: コーヒーフロート)	Sayaka Yamai	Norio Nitta	December 11, 2021
Puzzled as to why Prince Shareef is seeking an alliance with the Great Empire, Emperor Wolfgang travels to the Land of Sand. Afraid that this might lead to war with the Empire, Edmon, the Demon Kingdom's spy master, visits the Nekoya through his personal door to find out more details. All is eventually revealed when Shareef, Renna and Adelheid unite in the restaurant; in front of all assembled guests, Shareef proposes to Adelheid, and she accepts, causing the patrons to celebrate and Edmon to deliver a favorable report to his superiors.
24	12	"Pork Loin Cutlet"; Transliteration: "Rōsu Katsu" (Japanese: ロースカツ)	Takahiro Hirata	Masato Jinbo	December 18, 2021 (Note: This episode aired at 2:03 a.m. JST, 40 minutes after the original air time on TV Tokyo.)
24	12	"Buffet"; Transliteration: "Byuffe" (Japanese: ビュッフェ)	Takahiro Hirata	Masato Jinbo	December 18, 2021
The Nekoya staff are preparing for a celebration for Adelheid and Shareef's wedding when Yomi, a heroine of the Other World and the Master's grandmother, drops by to visit for the first time since her husband's death. Meeting her old friend Altorius, the day's first customer, the two start catching up, with Yomi reminiscing how she encountered Daiki and became his wife and co-owner of the restaurant. After enjoying a meal of pork loin cutlet, she acknowledges her grandson's culinary skill and entrusts him with the magical door's master key. Later on, the guests from the Other World assemble for the after-wedding party. As the guests celebrate, Aletta and Kuro joyously tell the Master about how Nekoya brought happiness to everyone.
