= Menchi =

- Menchi, in Japanese cuisine, a type of deep fry, for example Menchi katsu
- Menchi, a dog character in the manga Excel Saga
- Menchi, a character in the manga Hunter × Hunter
