= Hayashi rice =

Japanese rice dish

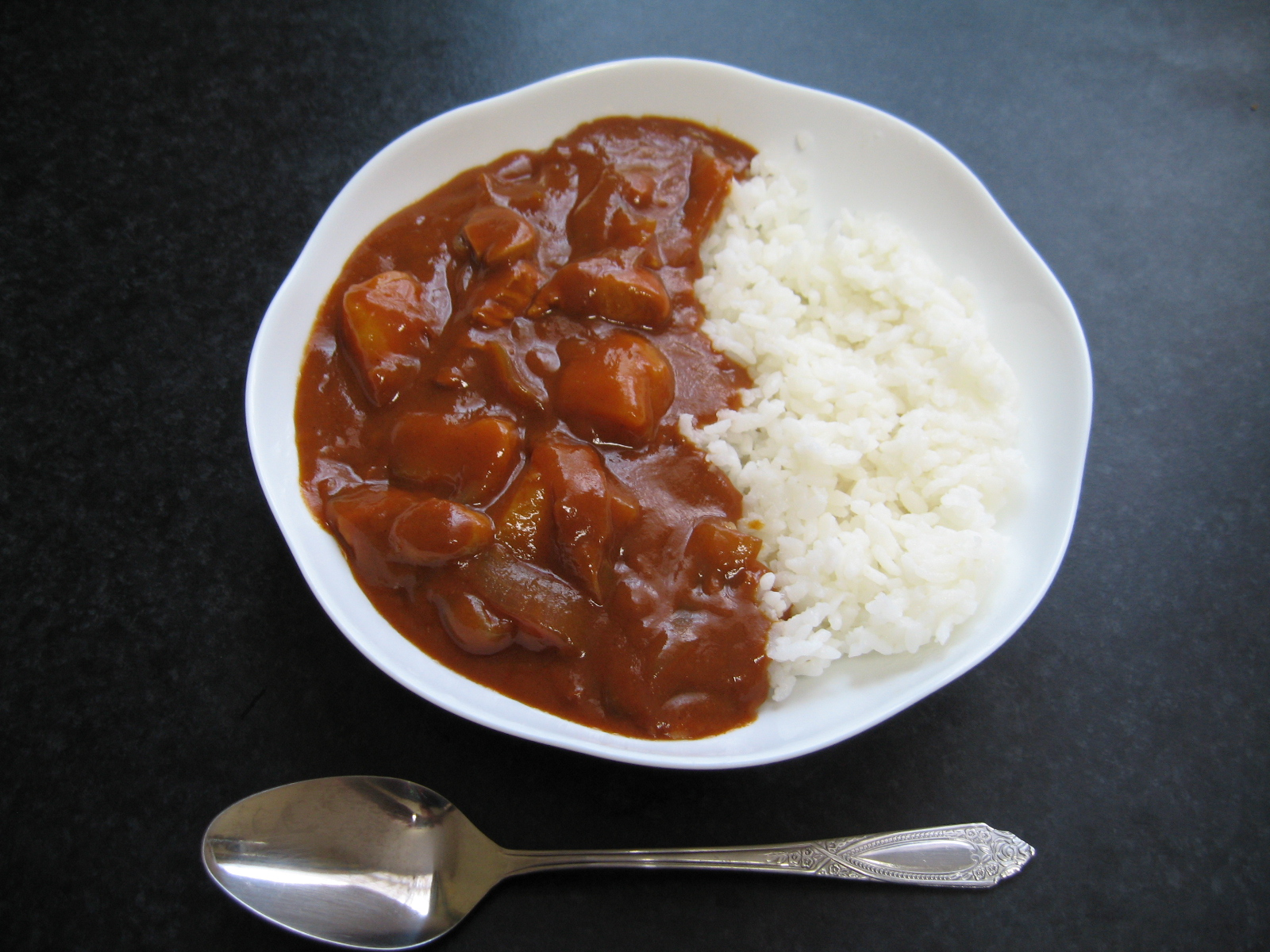
- A plate of hayashi rice
- Course: Main
- Place of origin: Japan
- Serving temperature: Hot
- Main ingredients: Rice, beef, onions, mushrooms, red wine, tomato sauce

Hayashi rice (ハヤシライス, hayashi raisu) is a dish popular in Japan as a Western-style dish, or yōshoku. It usually contains beef, onions, and button mushrooms in a thick demi-glace sauce often made with red wine and tomato sauce. This sauce is served atop or alongside steamed rice. The sauce is sometimes topped with a drizzle of fresh cream. Variants of the recipe sometimes include soy sauce and sake.

== History ==
There are several theories about the origin of this dish and its name:

- One belief is that the name was given by Yuteki Hayashi (早矢仕 有的, Hayashi Yūteki), the first president of publishing company Maruzen-Yushodo. Hayashi rice is a dish he invented and prepared for his employees who studied until late at night, or for his friends and foreign clients.
- Another theory is that the name was produced by a cook named Hayashi who often served this dish for staff meals at the Ueno Seiyōken restaurant.
- The name Hayashi is derived from the English phrase "hashed beef".

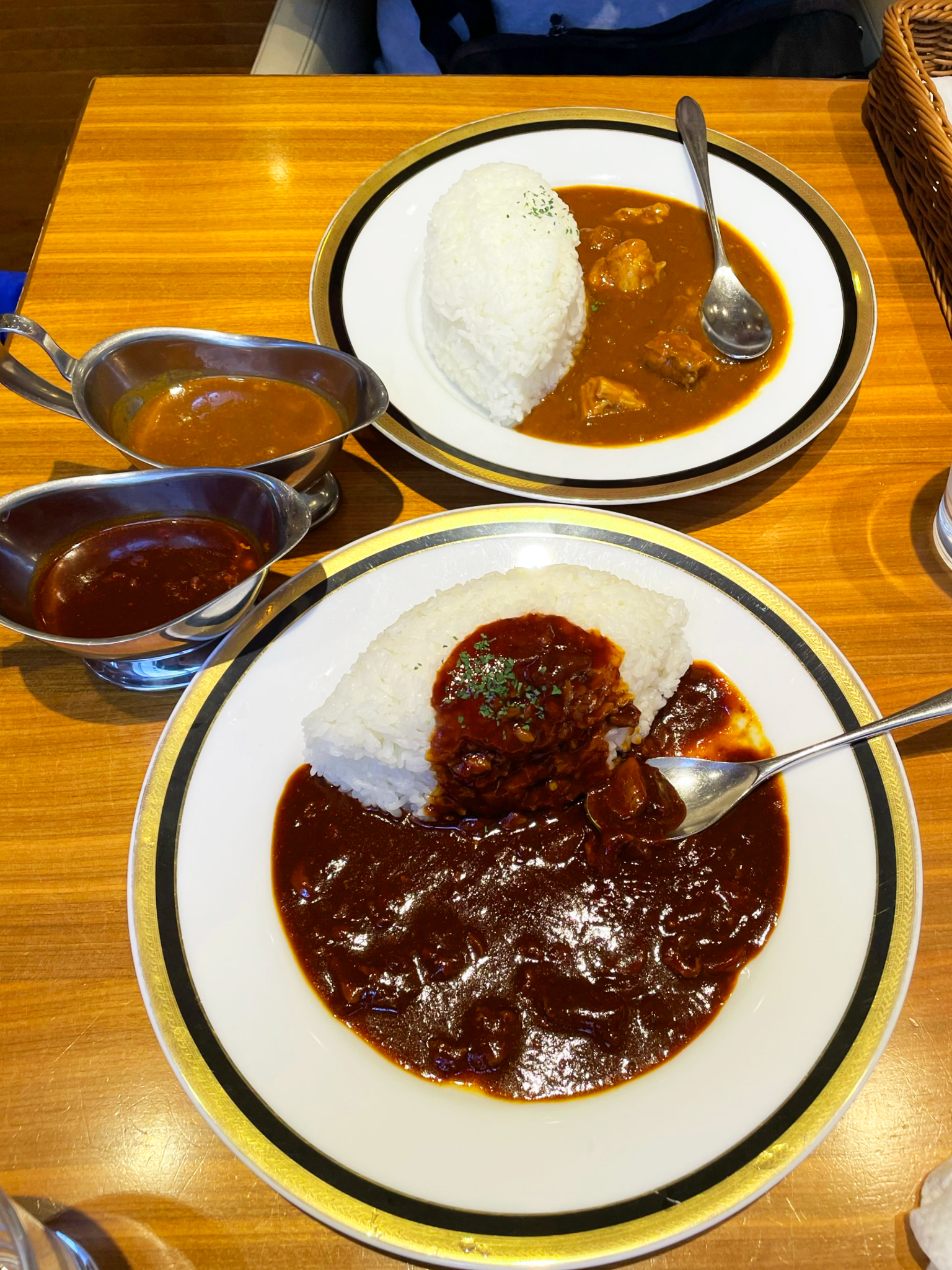
Hayashi rice (closer) and curry rice (further) served at Maruzen Cafe

== Ingredients and popularity ==
Hayashi rice demonstrates a Western influence with the use of demi-glace and often red wine, but is unknown in Western countries. In fact, it contains ingredients popular in Japan: slices of beef (Hyōgo Prefecture is also famous for its Kobe beef), rice and demi-glace sauce (among others). It can be compared to another popular dish, the Japanese-style hamburger steak with demi-glace sauce. Another variation is the omuhayashi, a combination of omurice and hayashi rice. It also resembles a Japanese curry and usually appears on menus alongside curry.

Hayashi rice is one of Japan's most popular Western-style dishes. Thanks to the widespread availability of hayashi rice mix (normally sold as roux blocks) and prepared demiglace sauce (normally canned) at Japanese supermarkets, this dish is common household fare. Like Japanese curry, it is usually eaten with a spoon.

== Gallery ==
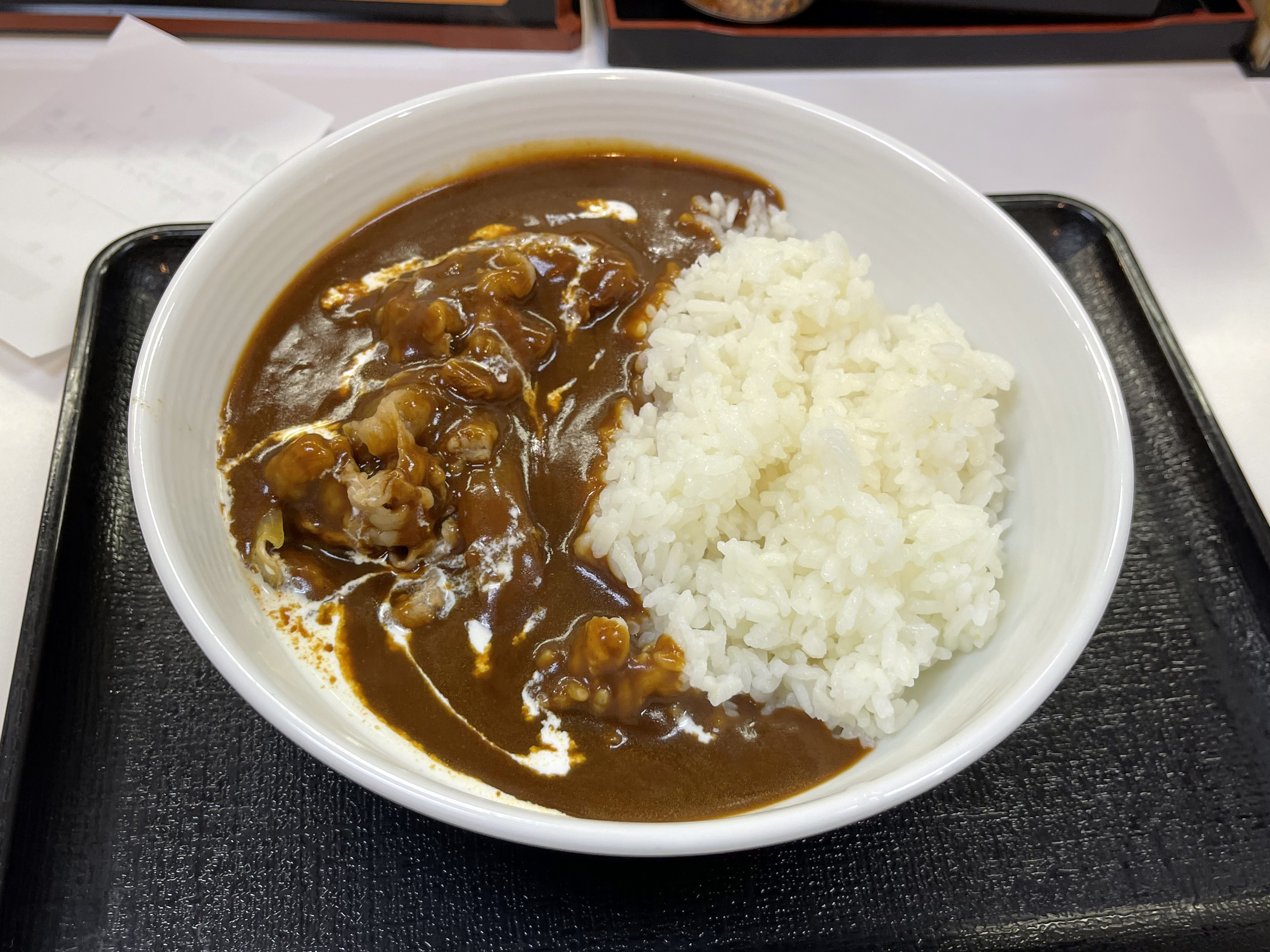
From Yoshinoya restaurant

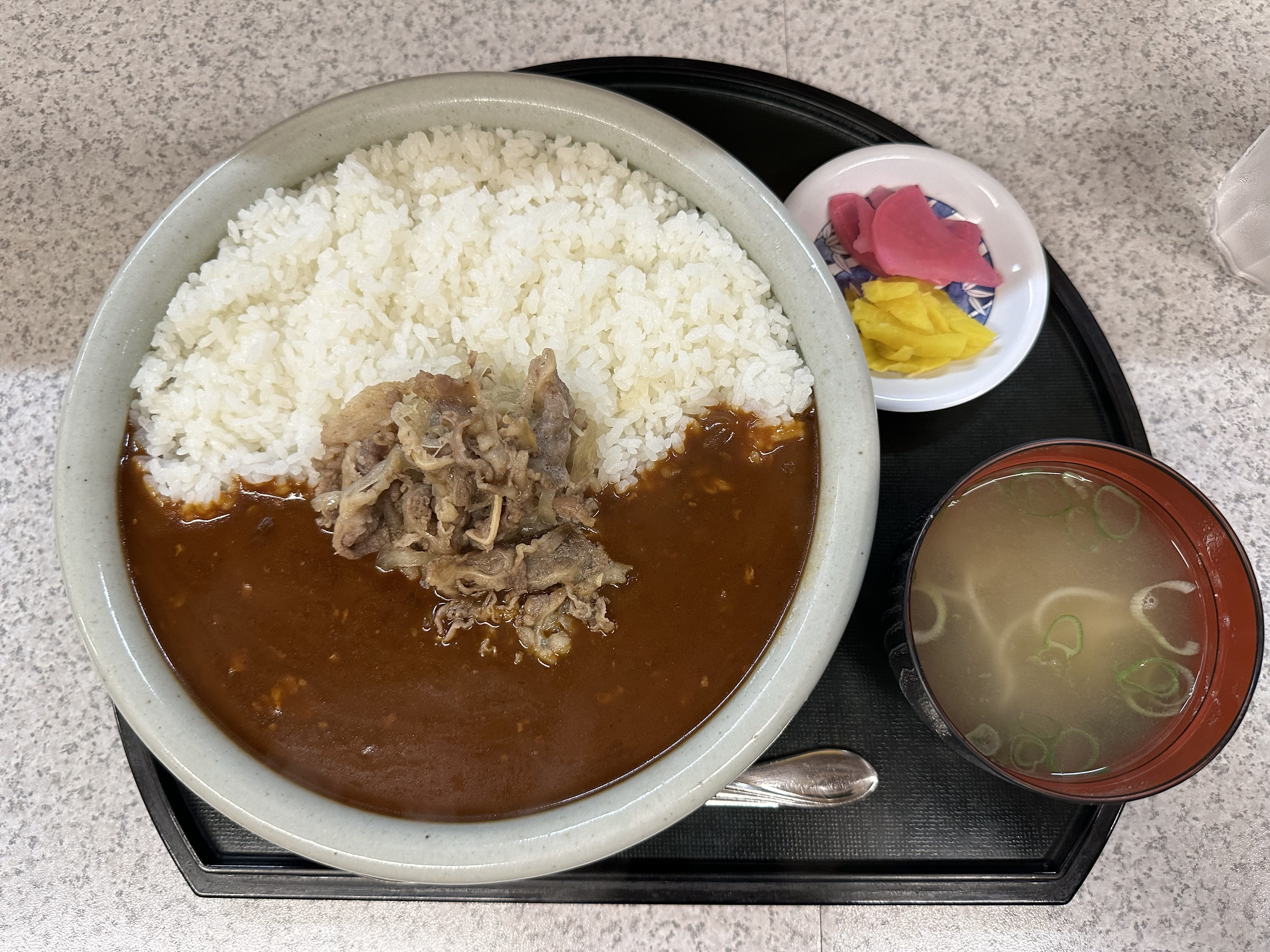
With miso soup and takuan

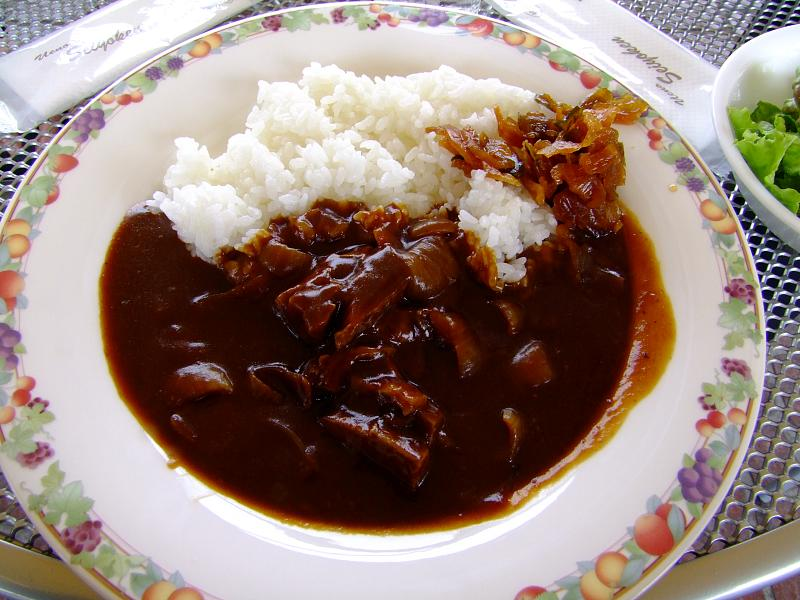

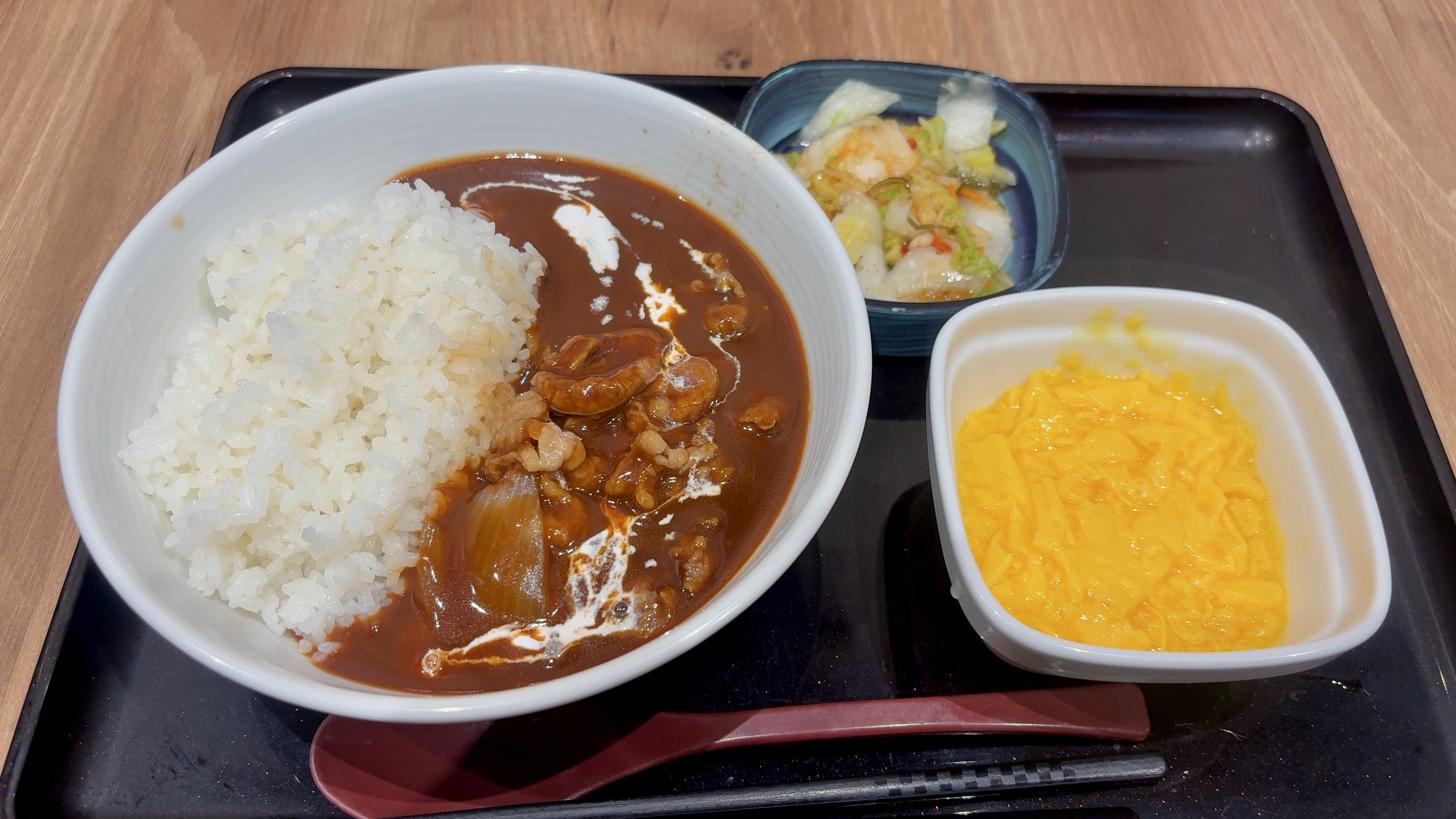

== See also ==
- Beef bourguignon
