= Korokke =

Japanese croquette

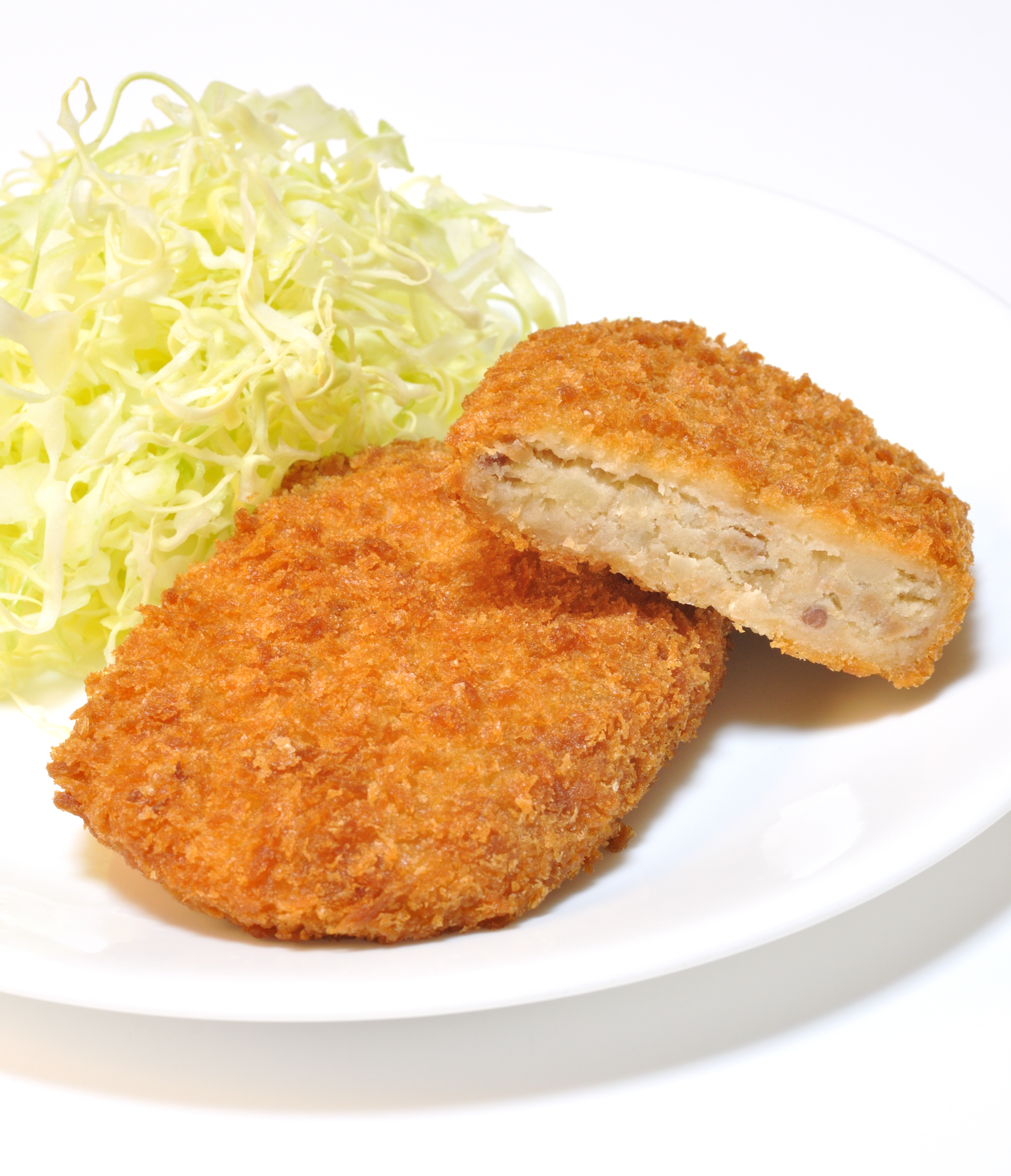
- Type: Croquette
- Place of origin: Japan
- Region or state: East Asia
- Main ingredients: Meats, potato, panko

Korokke (Japanese: コロッケ; [koꜜɾokke]) is a Japanese deep-fried yōshoku dish originally related to a French dish, the croquette. Korokke is made by mixing cooked chopped meat, seafood, or vegetables with mashed potato or white sauce, usually shaped like a flat patty, rolling it in wheat flour, eggs, and Japanese-style breadcrumbs, then deep-frying this until brown on the outside.

== History ==
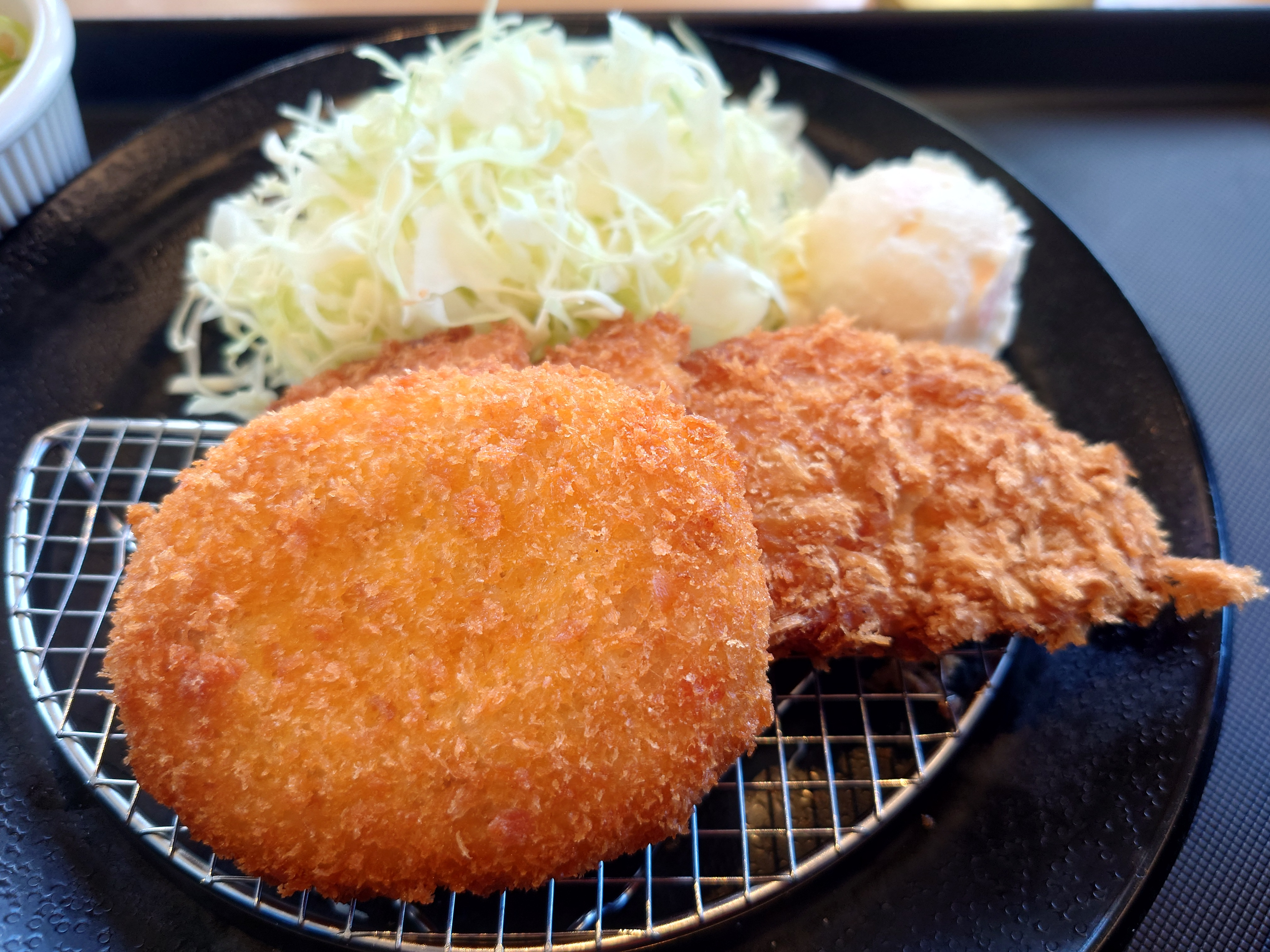
Korokke (front) and tonkatsu

In 1887, the French croquette was introduced to Japan. It is thought that the korokke using mashed potatoes was invented because dairy processing technology had not been popularized in Japan at that time. The first mention of a "kuroketto" appears in cookery books from the Meiji era.

Korokke can be found in almost every supermarket and convenience store in Japan and is enjoyed for its taste and its low cost.

Korokke became associated with typhoons in the 2000s, after a user on 2channel said they were eating some to prepare for an approaching typhoon, beginning a tradition that persisted on Japanese social media.

== Varieties ==
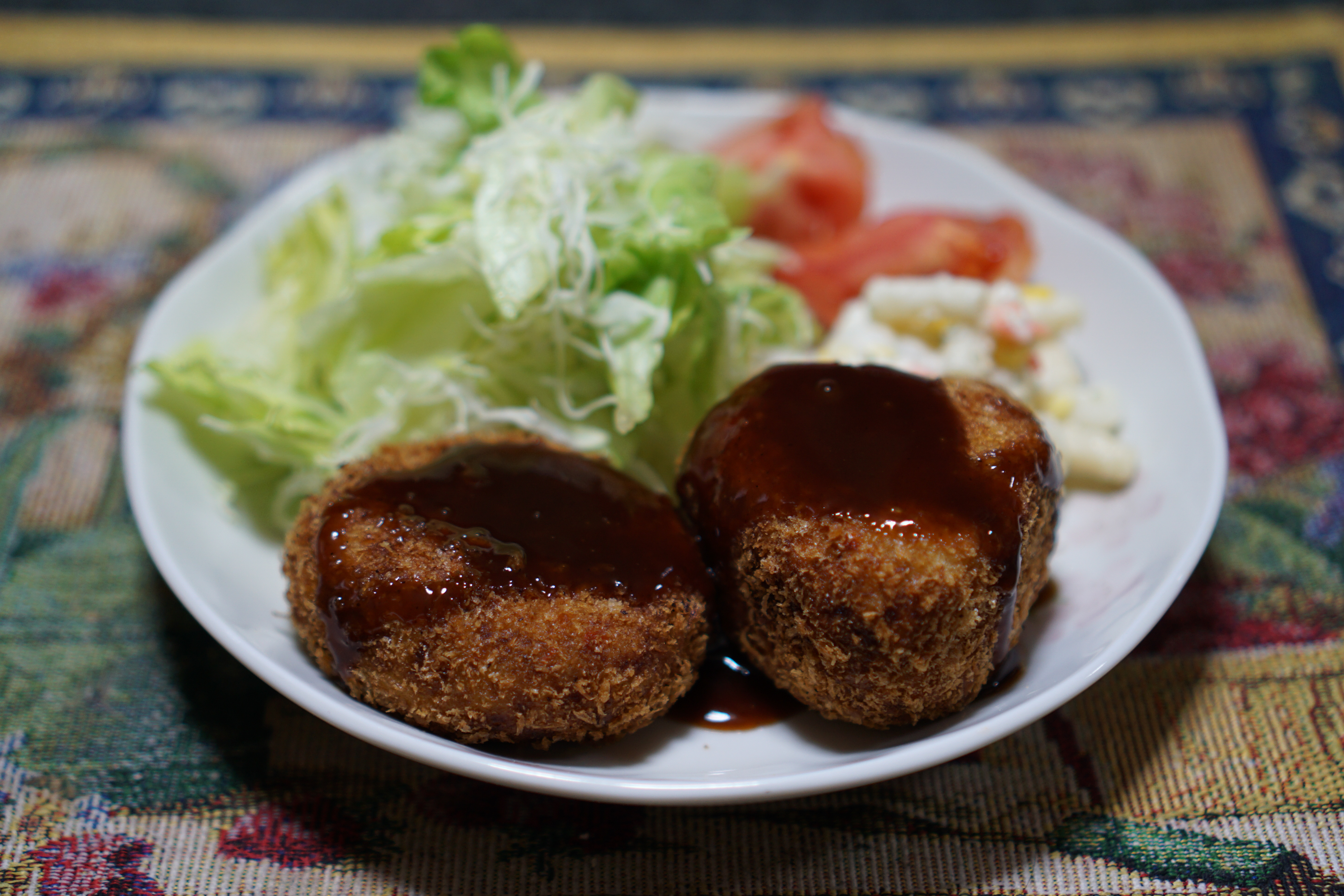
Korokke and salad

There are numerous types of korokke depending on the main ingredient or the ingredient mixed and they are generally named (ingredient) korokke.

- Potato korokke - korokke made using potatoes
- Meat korokke - korokke made with ground meat and potatoes. If made with meat only, it is menchi-katsu.
- Tuna korokke - korokke with tuna
- Yasai (vegetable) korokke - korokke with mixed vegetables
- Curry korokke - curry-flavored korokke
- Kabocha (pumpkin) korokke - korokke made using pumpkins
- Okara korokke - korokke made using okara
- Cream korokke - korokke made with white sauce
- Guratan korokke - korokke with white sauce and macaroni

Korokke are sometimes sold wrapped in paper. They may also be used as a topping for other dishes. When sandwiched between two slices of bread, they are called korokke pan (pan being 'bread' in Japanese), or korokke sando ('sandwich'). Gurakoro is a product introduced by the Japanese McDonald's which is made by sandwiching guratan korokke.

== In other foods ==
Korokke is often eaten as part of a meal, such as in bento or curry.

With soba noodles

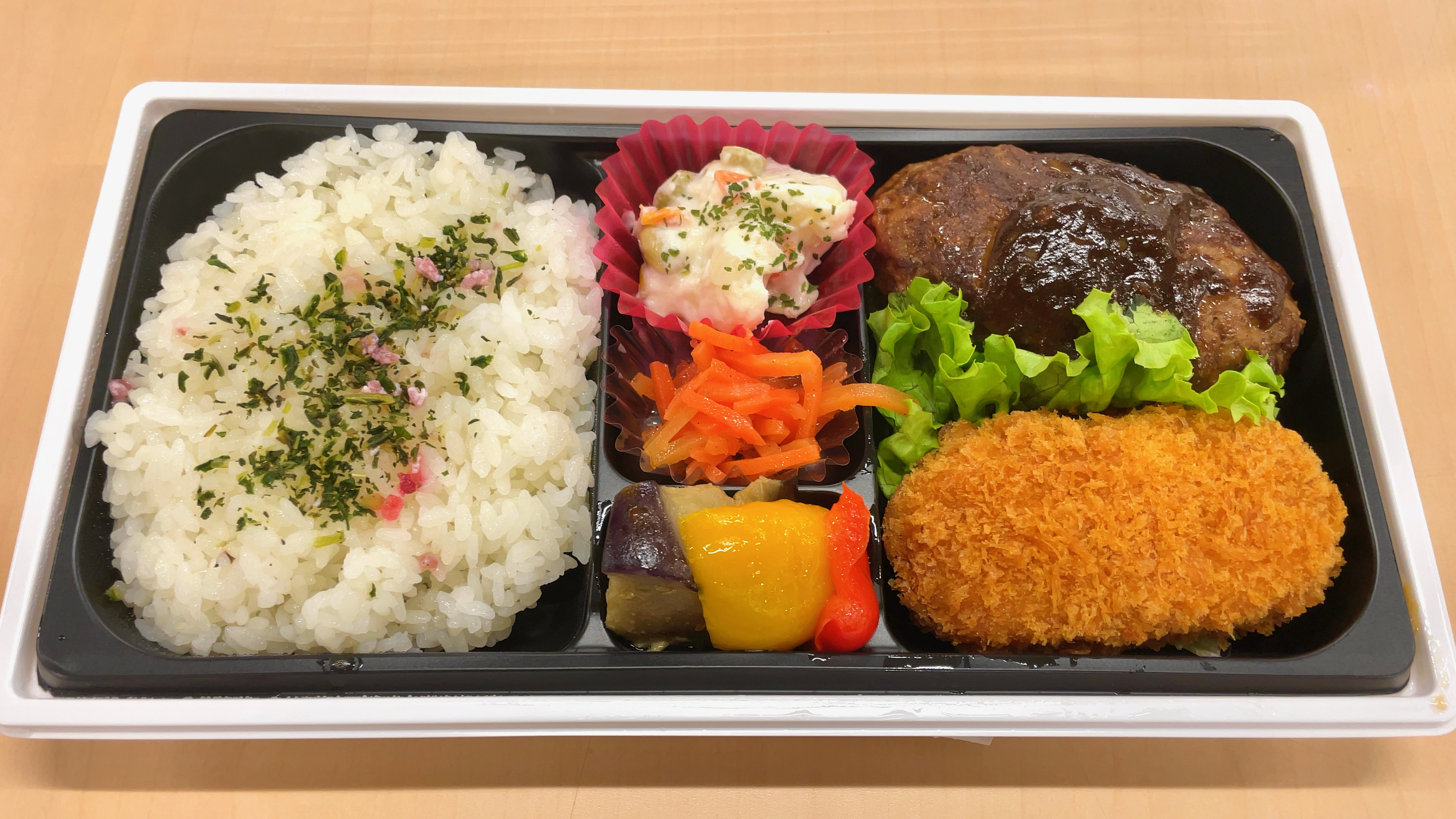
In a bento

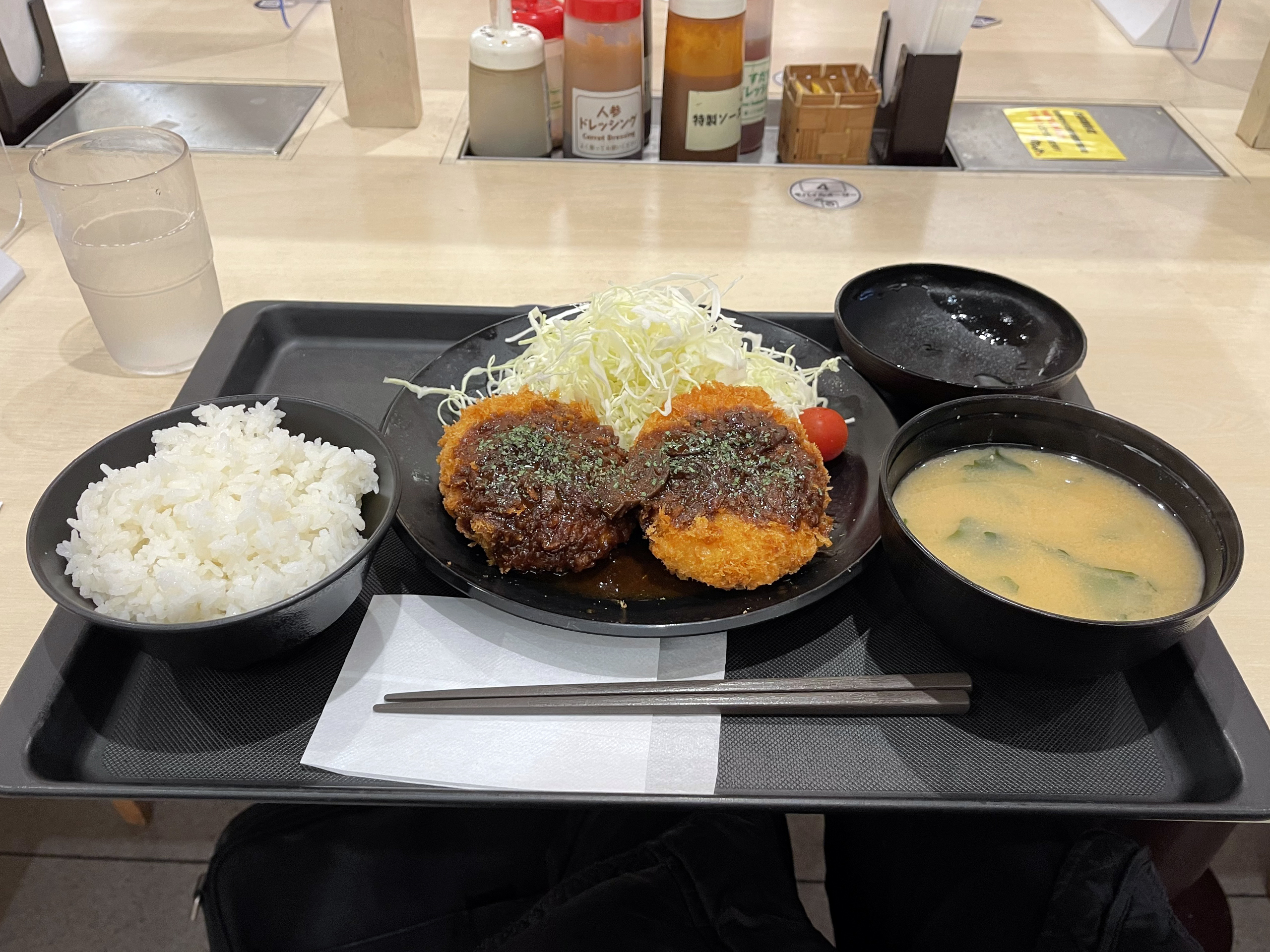
With rice and miso soup

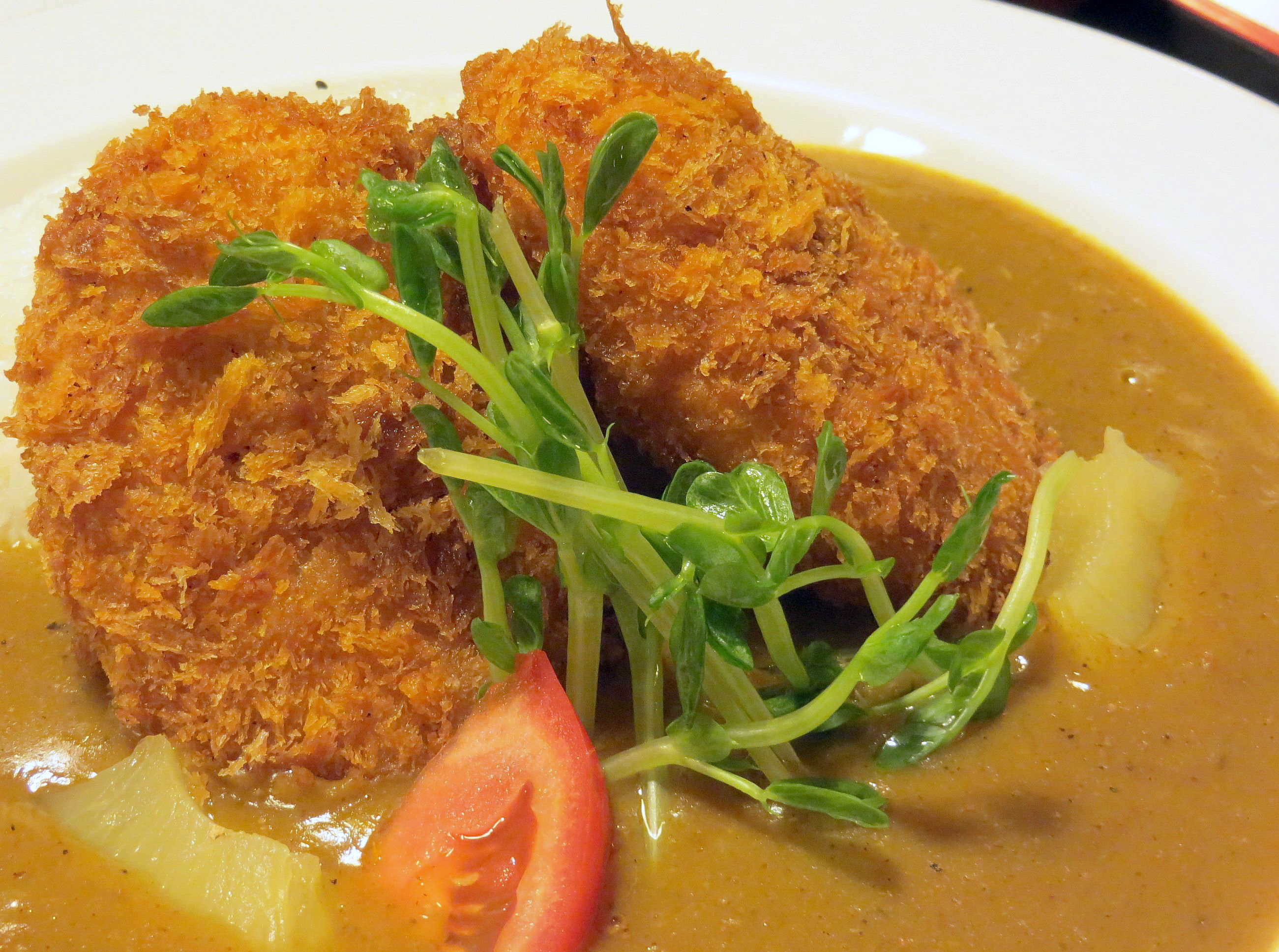
With curry

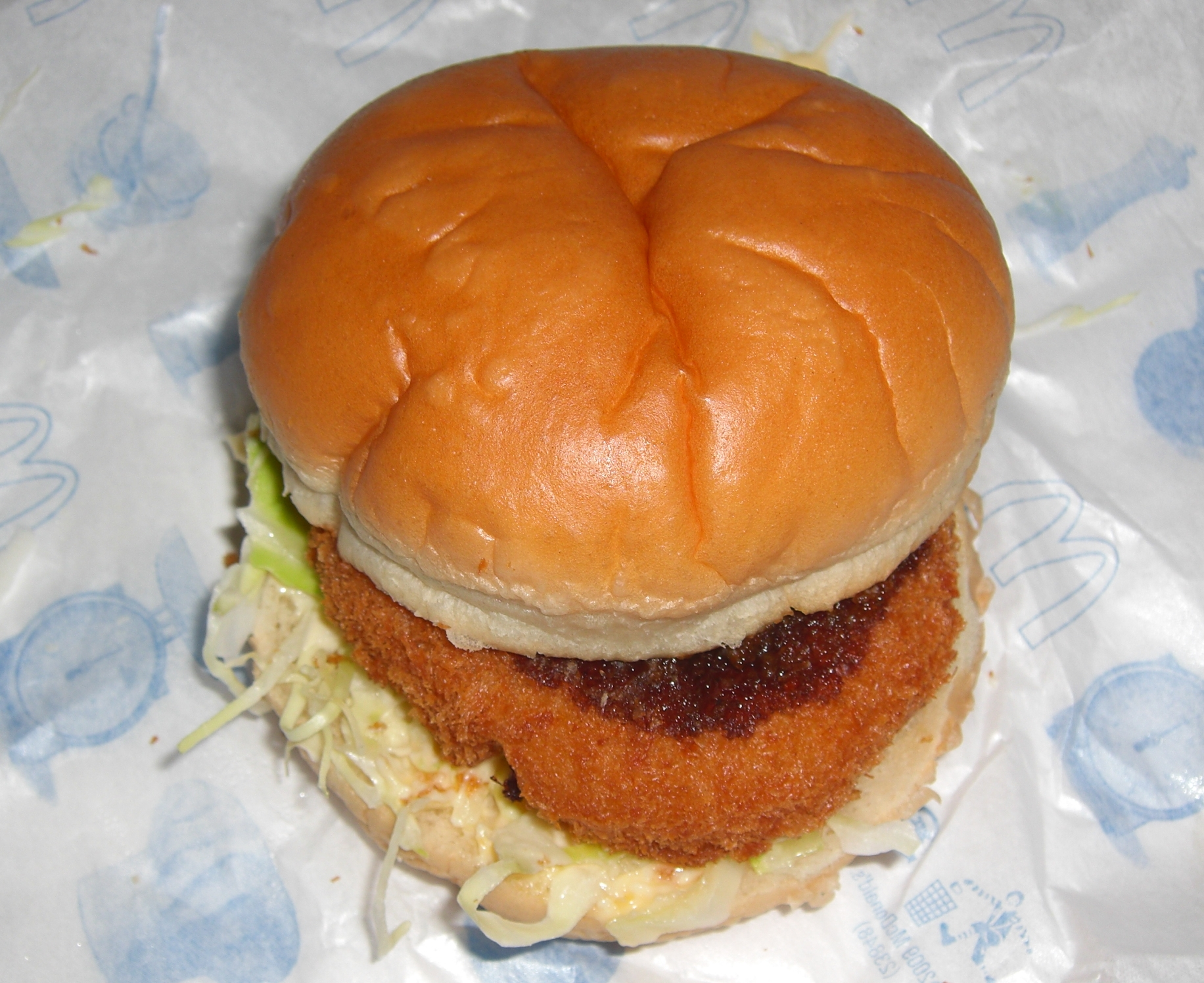
McDonald's gurakoro burger

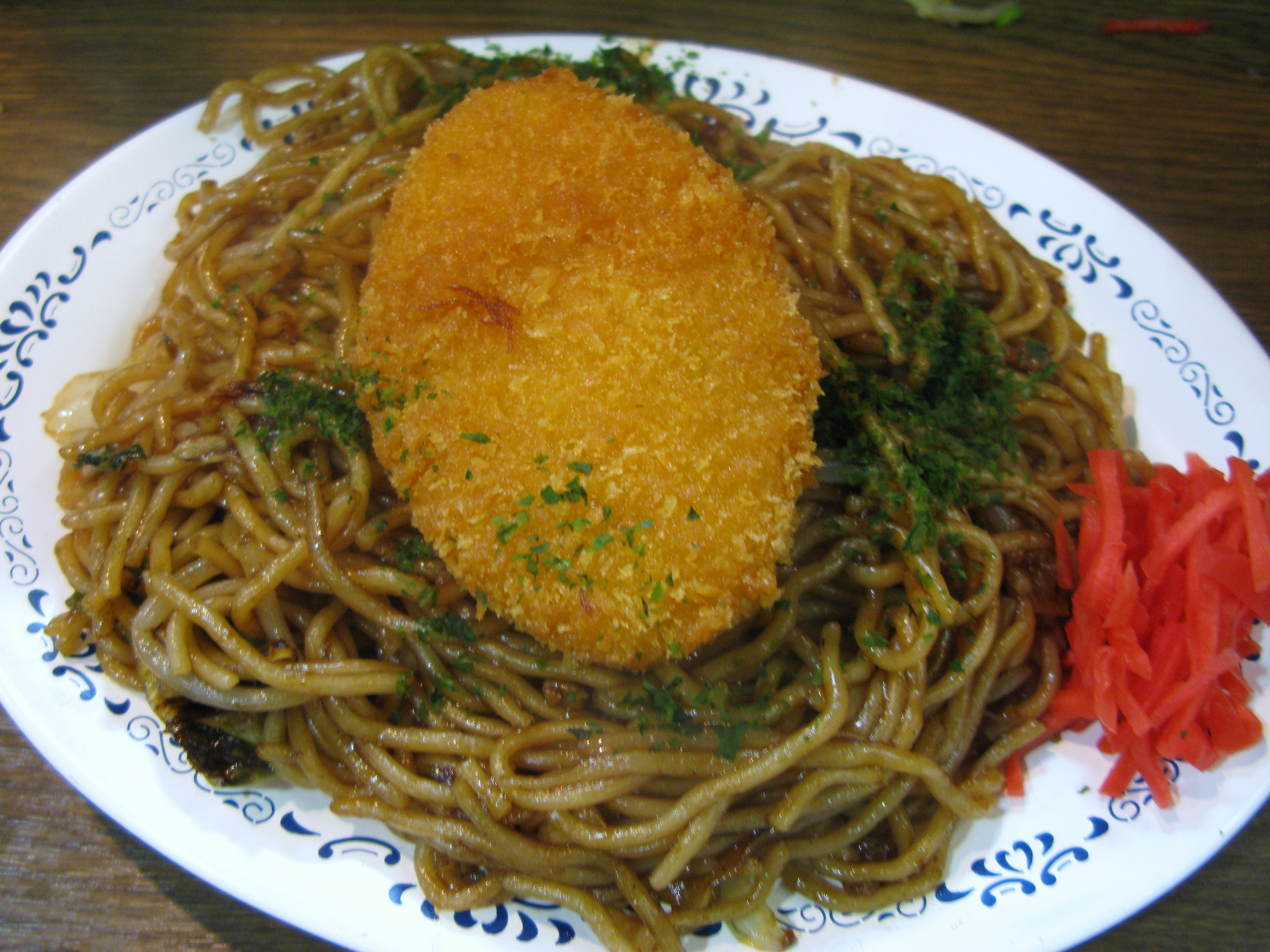
With yakisoba

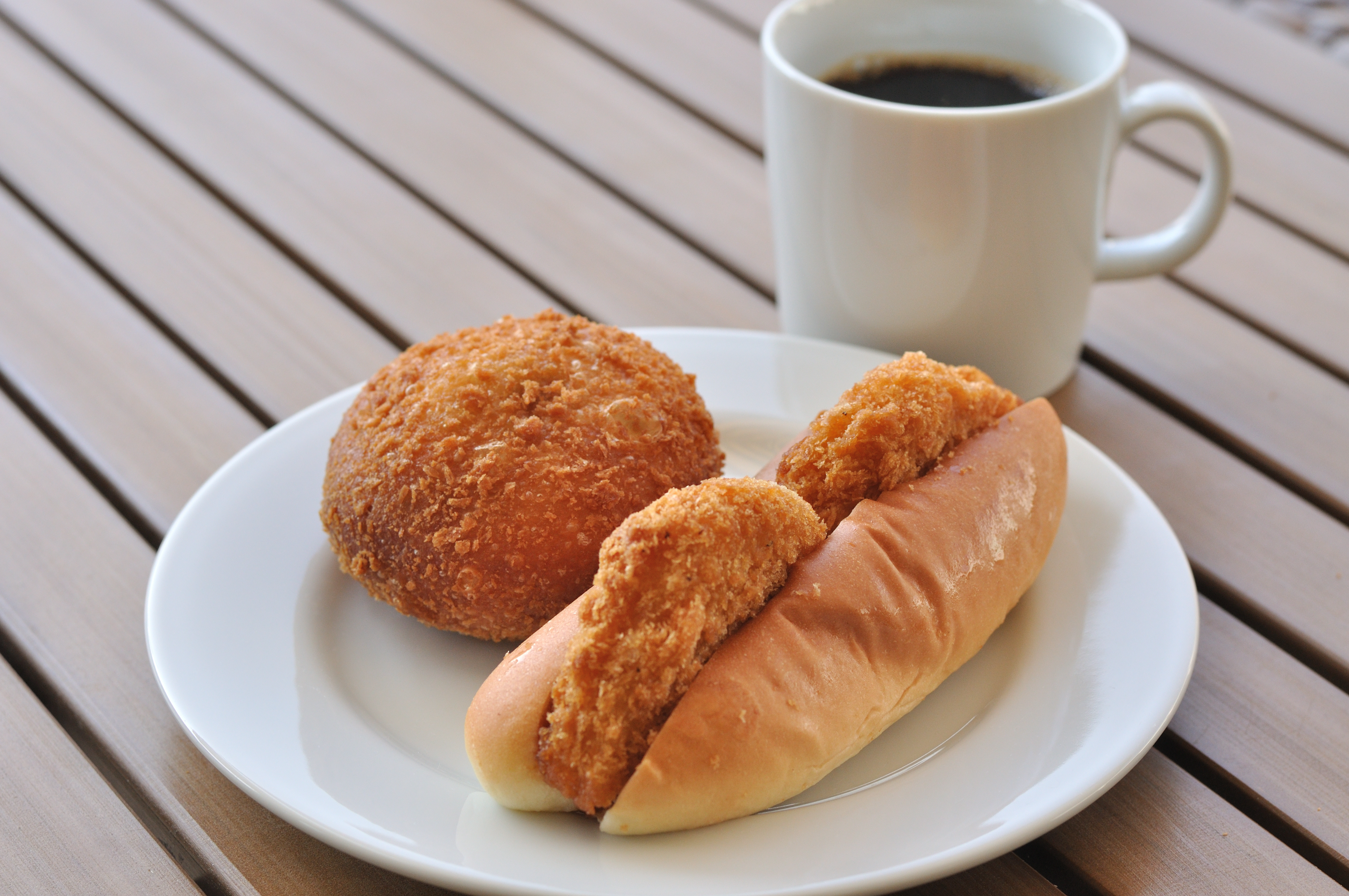
Korokke-pan

== See also ==
- Akara – Deep-fried bean cake
- Corn fritters – Fried cakes of maize dough
- Croquette – Small breaded, deep-fried food
- Falafel – Middle Eastern fried bean dish
- Fritter – Deep-fried sweet or savoury snack
- Ganmodoki – Tofu fritter made with vegetables
- Goroke – Small breaded, deep-fried food
- Hushpuppy – Deep-fried savory food made from cornmeal batter
- Knish – Ashkenazi Jewish and Eastern European baked or fried snack food
- List of deep fried foods
- Pakora – Spiced fritter originally from the Indian subcontinent
- Samosa – Deep-fried snack/turnover
- Tater tots – Deep-fried grated potato cylinders
- Tempura – Japanese dish of battered, deep-fried fish or vegetables
- Vada – Category of savoury fried snacks from India
- Veggie burger – Non-meat hamburger
