= Yōshoku =

Japanese style of Western-influenced cooking

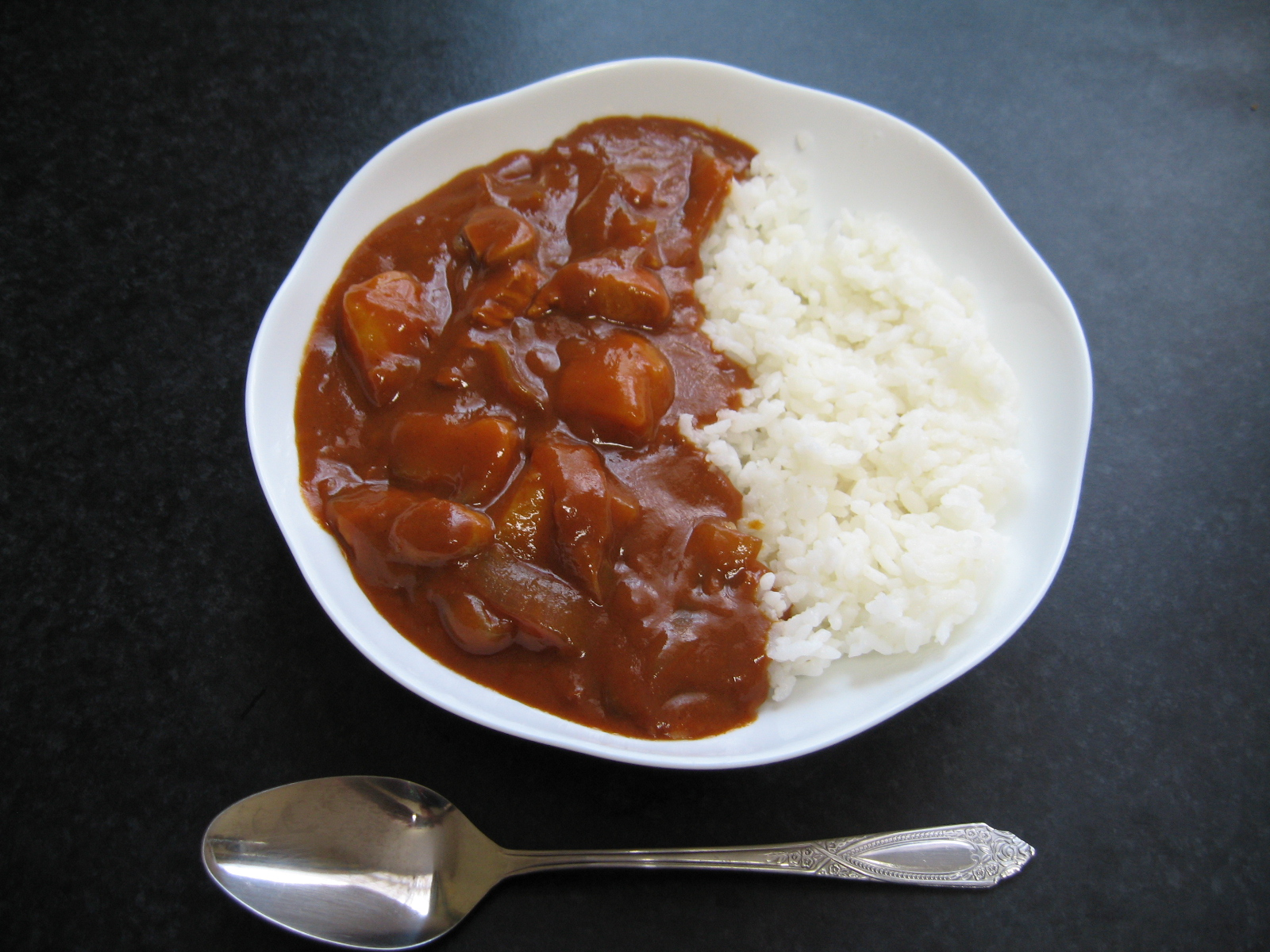
Hayashi rice

In Japanese cuisine, yōshoku (洋食, western food) refers to a style of Western-influenced cooking which originated during the Meiji Restoration. These are primarily Japanized forms of European dishes, often featuring Western names, and usually written in katakana. It is an example of fusion cuisine.

== History ==
At the beginning of the Meiji Restoration (1868–1912), national seclusion was eliminated and the Meiji Emperor declared Western ideas helpful for Japan's future progress. As part of the reforms, the Emperor lifted the ban on red meat and promoted Western cuisine, which was viewed as the cause of the Westerners' greater physical size. Yōshoku thus relies on meat as an ingredient, unlike the typical Japanese cuisine at the time. Additionally, many of the Westerners who started to live in Japan at that time refused to touch traditional Japanese food (washoku), so their private Japanese chefs learned how to cook them Western-style cuisine, often with a Japanese spin.

The first recorded print appearance of the term "yōshoku" dates back to 1872. In the past, the term was for Western cuisine, regardless of the country of origin (as opposed to French, English, Italian, etc.), but people became aware of differences between European cuisines and yōshoku in the 1980s, due to the opening of many European restaurants serving more authentically European (non-Japanized) food.

In 1872, Japanese writer Kanagaki Robun (仮名垣魯文) popularized the related term seiyō ryōri in his Seiyō Ryōritsū ('western food handbook'). Seiyō ryōri mostly refers to French and Italian cooking while Yōshoku is a generic term for Japanese dishes inspired by Western food that are distinct from the washoku tradition. Another difference is that seiyō ryōri is eaten using a knife and fork, while Yōshoku is eaten using chopsticks and a spoon.

Earlier dishes of European origin – notably those imported from Portugal in the 16th century such as tempura (inspired by the fritter-cooking techniques of the Portuguese residing in Nagasaki in the 16th century), are not, strictly speaking, part of yoshoku, which refers only to Meiji-era food. However, some yōshoku restaurants serve tempura.

Yōshoku varies in how Japanized it is: while yōshoku may be eaten with a spoon (as in カレー, karē, curry), paired with bread or a plate of rice (called ライス, raisu) and written in katakana to reflect that they are foreign words, some have become sufficiently Japanized that they are often treated as normal Japanese food (washoku), served alongside rice and miso soup, and eaten with chopsticks. An example of the latter is katsu, which is eaten with chopsticks and a bowl of white rice (ご飯; gohan), and may even be served with traditional Japanese sauces such as ponzu or grated daikon, rather than katsu sauce. Reflecting this, katsu is often written in hiragana as かつ, as a native Japanese word, rather than as カツ (from カツレツ, katsuretsu, 'cutlet').

Another more contemporary term for Western food is mukokuseki ("no-nationality" cuisine).

== Overview ==
Jihei Ishii, author of the 1898 The Japanese Complete Cookbook (日本料理法大全), states that: "Yōshoku is Japanese food."

Created in the Meiji era, it may not have as long a history as washoku (Japanese traditional dishes), yet there are yōshoku dishes which have themselves become traditional Japanese fare. Yōshoku is considered a field of Japanese cuisine, including such typical adapted meals as katsu, beefsteak, korokke, naporitan, Hayashi rice and curry rice (Japanese curry). Many of these meals are even assumed to be washoku.

Yōshoku began by altering Western recipes for lack of information about foreign countries' cuisine, or adaptions to suit local tastes, but over time, yōshoku also evolved dishes that were not at all based on European foods, such as chicken rice and omurice (omelette rice). Elaborate sauces were largely eliminated, replaced with tomato ketchup, demi-glace sauce and Worcestershire sauce.

During Japan's modernization, yōshoku was often too expensive for the common man. But after World War II, ingredients for yōshoku became more widely available and its popularity grew.

A yōshokuya (洋食屋) is a restaurant where yōshoku dishes are served. During Japan's rapid economic growth people began eating yōshoku in department store restaurants, but now family restaurants such as Denny's and Saizeriya are considered essential yōshoku establishments. In addition, there are also a number of upscale yōshoku restaurants in Japan, such as Shiseido Parlor in Ginza and Taimeiken in Nihonbashi (two areas of Tokyo).

== Typical yōshoku dishes ==
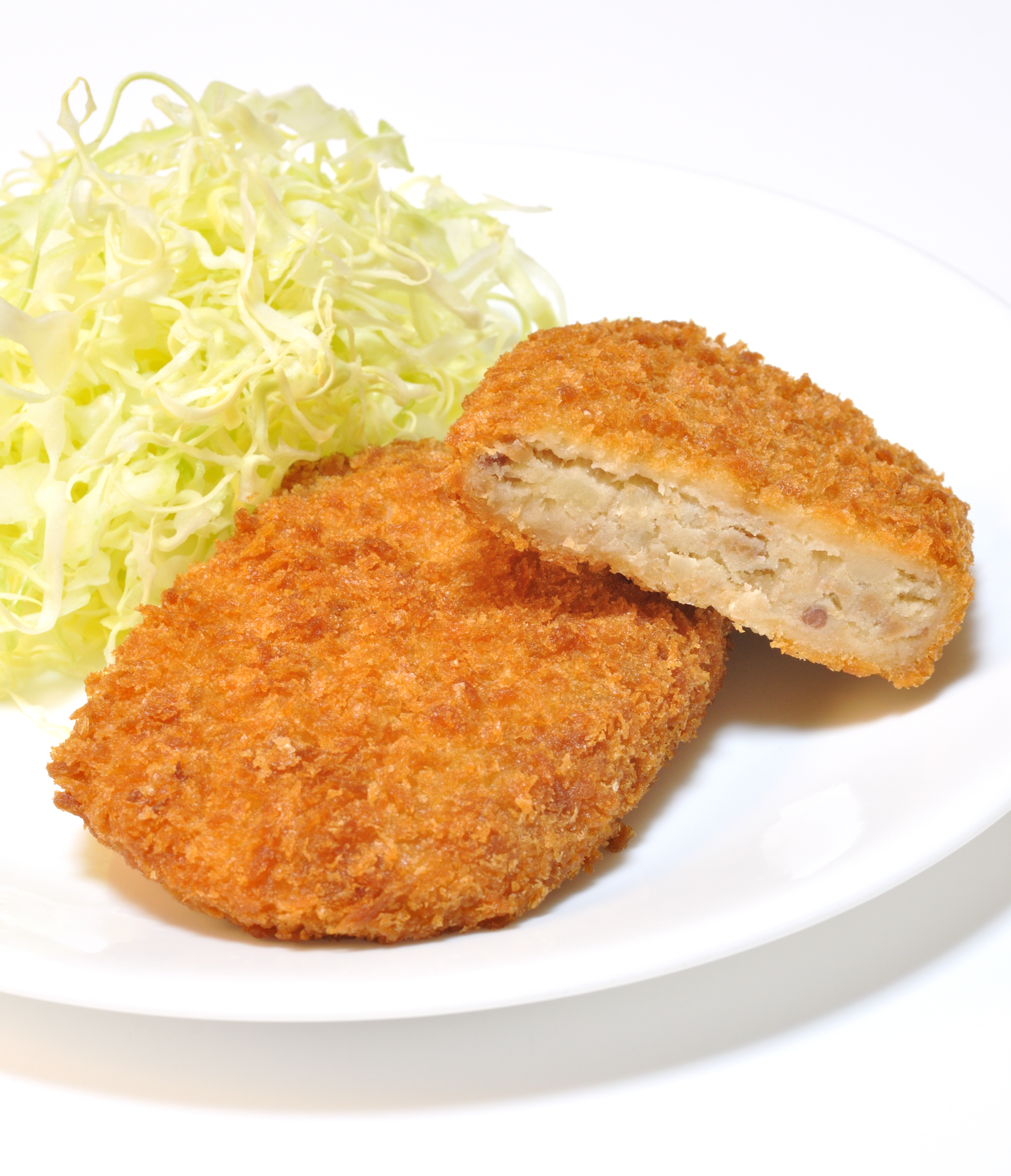
Korokke

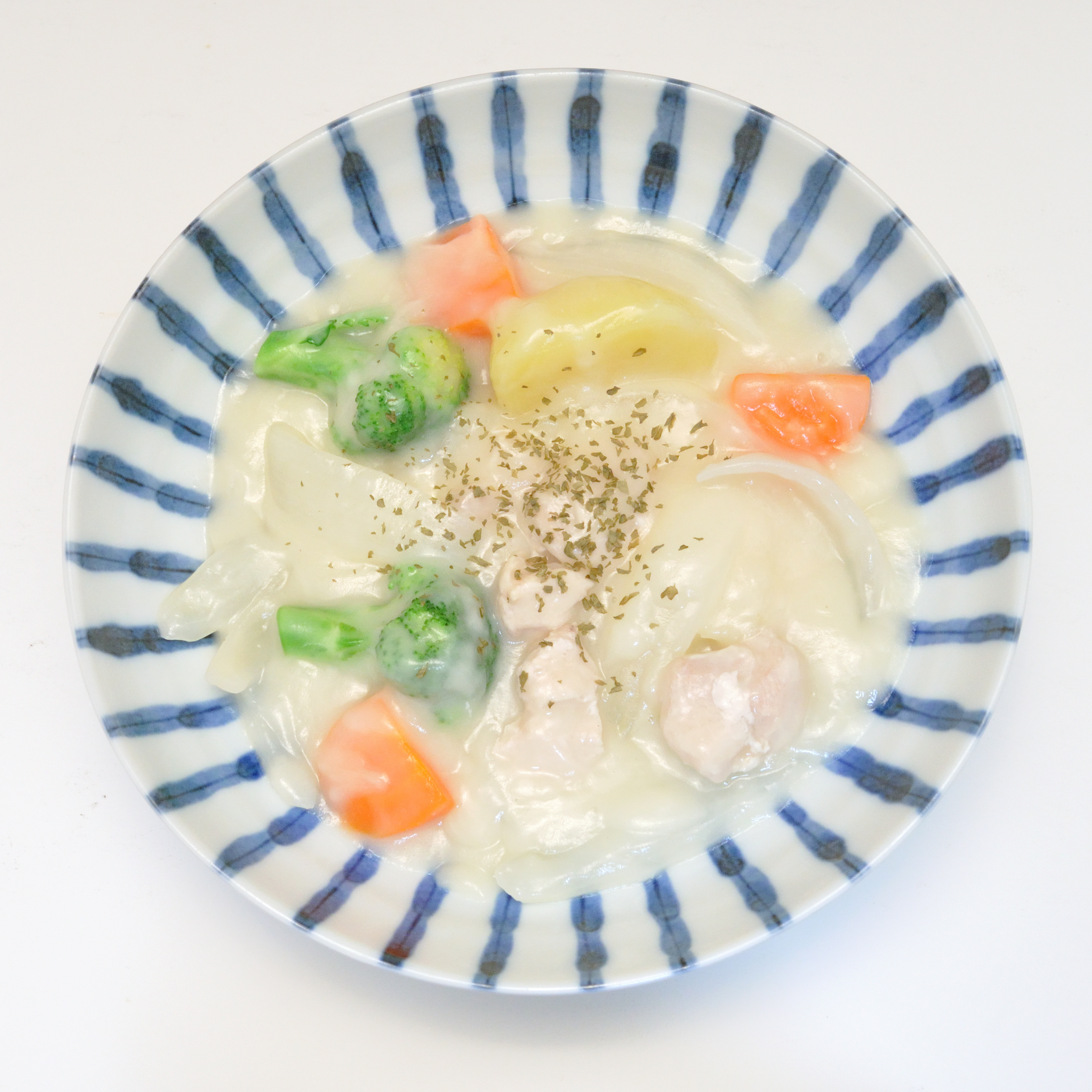
Cream stew

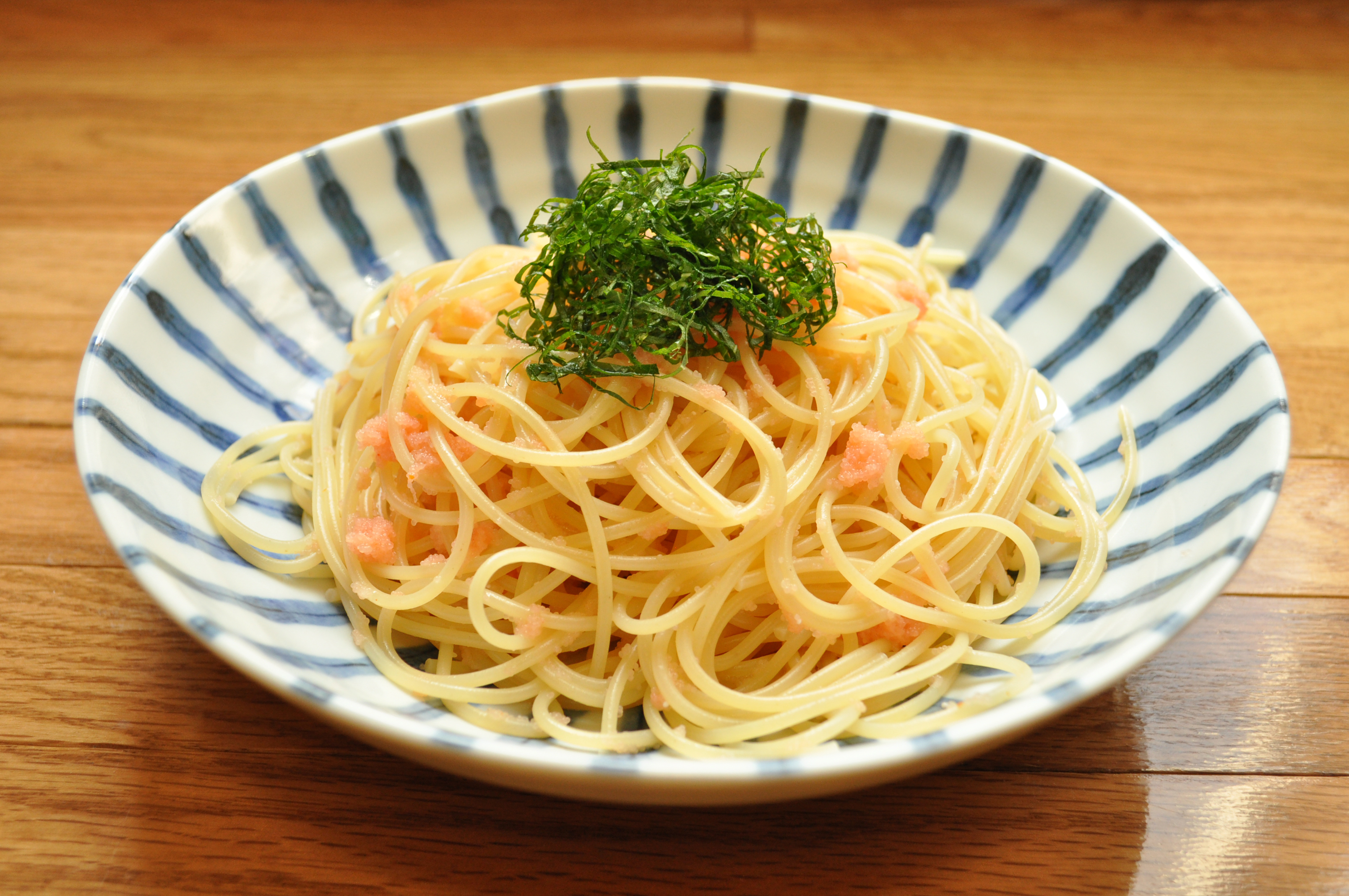
Tarako spaghetti

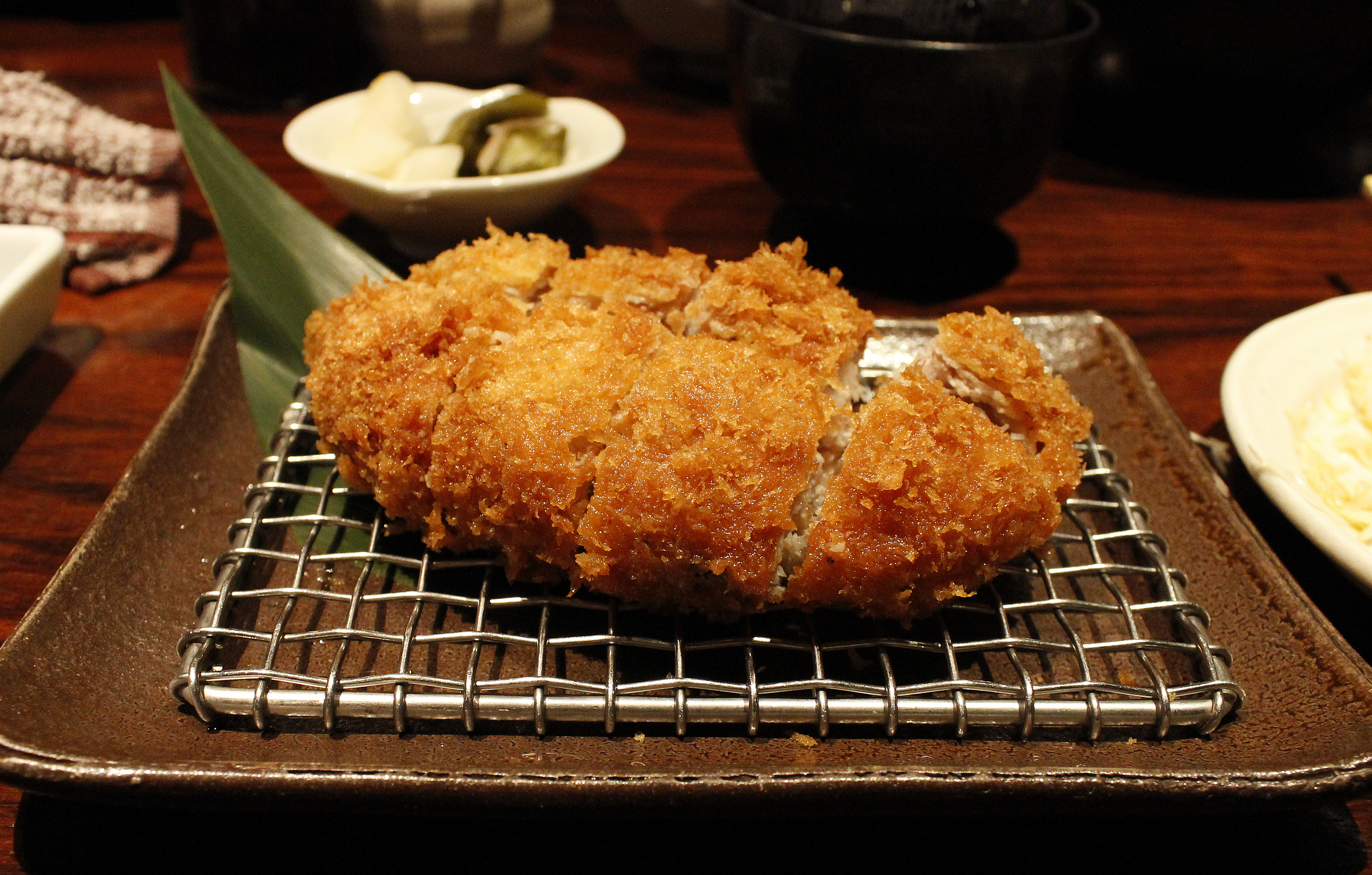
Tonkatsu

- Castella
- Curry
- Stew
  - Hayashi rice
  - Cream stew
  - Nikujaga 肉じゃが
- Korokke
- Chicken nanban (チキン南蛮, chikin nanban): fried chicken seasoned with vinegar and tartar sauce
- Piroshiki
- Breaded dishes (furai)
  - Kaki furai (カキフライ): fried oysters
  - Ebi furai (エビフライ): fried shrimp
  - Aji furai (アジフライ): fried Japanese horse mackerel
  - Ika furai (イカフライ): fried squid (fried calamari)
- Beef steak (ビーフステーキ, Bīfusutēki): Steak with Japanese-style sauce
- Meuniere
- Spaghetti
  - Naporitan: Ketchup spaghetti with sausage and vegetables
  - Tarako spaghetti (たらこスパゲッティ, tarako spaghetti): Japanese tarako (cod roe) spaghetti
  - Japanese mushroom spaghetti (和風きのこスパゲッティ, Wafu kinoko spaghetti): Japanese style soy sauce and mushroom spaghetti
  - Ankake spaghetti (あんかけスパゲッティ, Ankake spaghetti): this dish is mainly eaten in Nagoya. Spaghetti with a spicy sticky sauce.
  - Nattō spaghetti (納豆スパゲティ, Nattō spaghetti)
  - Edible wild plants spaghetti (山菜スパゲティ, Sansai spaghetti)
  - Tuna spaghetti (ツナスパゲティ, Tuna spaghetti)
  - mizore (grated radish) spaghetti (みぞれスパゲティ, Mizore spaghetti): mizore had come from the name of the Japanese wet snow
- Cutlet
  - Tonkatsu
  - Fried chicken (chicken katsu)
  - Beef cutlet (beef katsu)
  - Ham katsu
  - Menchi katsu
  - Turkish rice (torukorice): Pilaf flavored with curry, naporitan spaghetti and tonkatsu with demi-glace sauce
- Omurice
- Steak
  - Hamburg
- Mikkusu sando (ミックスサンド) – assorted sandwiches, especially egg salad, ham, and cutlet
- Gratin
- Doria: Roasted pilaf with béchamel sauce and cheese
- Crème caramel: Also known as Purin in Japanese.
- Baumkuchen

== See also ==
- List of common yōshoku dishes
- Hong Kong-style Western cuisine, a similar phenomenon in Hong Kong
- Haipai cuisine, a similar phenomenon in Shanghai
