= Menchi-katsu =

Japanese breaded and deep-fried ground meat patty

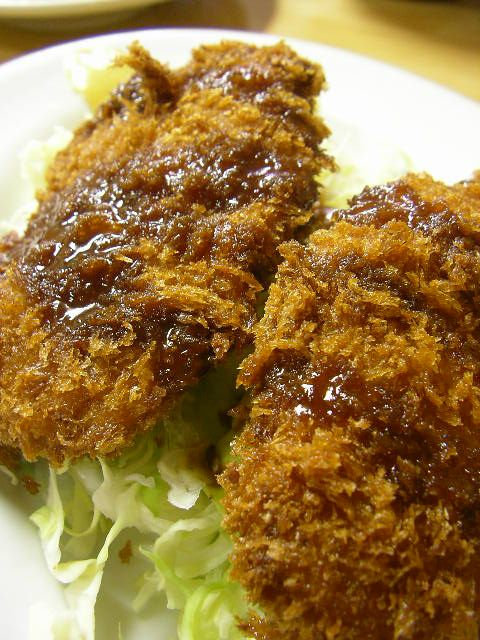
- Place of origin: Japan
- Main ingredients: Meat, panko

Menchi-katsu (メンチカツ) is a Japanese breaded and deep-fried ground meat patty: a fried meat cake. The meat is usually ground beef, pork, or a mixture of the two. It is often served in inexpensive bento and teishoku. Menchi-katsu is also used as a sandwich filling.

== Preparation ==
The ground meat is mixed with chopped onion, salt, and pepper, and made into patties. Flour is applied on both sides of these patties. They are coated with beaten eggs, further coated with bread crumbs, and deep fried until golden brown. The bread crumbs, called panko, are specially dehydrated and have a coarser texture than other bread crumbs. Katsu are usually served with Japanese Worcestershire sauce or tonkatsu sauce (a variant of Worcestershire thickened with fruit and vegetable purees) and sliced cabbage.

== Etymology ==
Menchi and katsu are phonologically modified versions of the words "mince" and "cutlet". Katsu may refer to any deep-fried meat cutlet coated with flour, egg, and bread crumbs. It is an example of yōshoku, or foods adapted from western cuisine. Katsu by itself usually refers to tonkatsu, which is made with pork cutlets.

While menchi-katsu is used prevalently in eastern Japan, in western Japan it is more commonly called minchi-katsu (ミンチカツ).

== Gallery ==
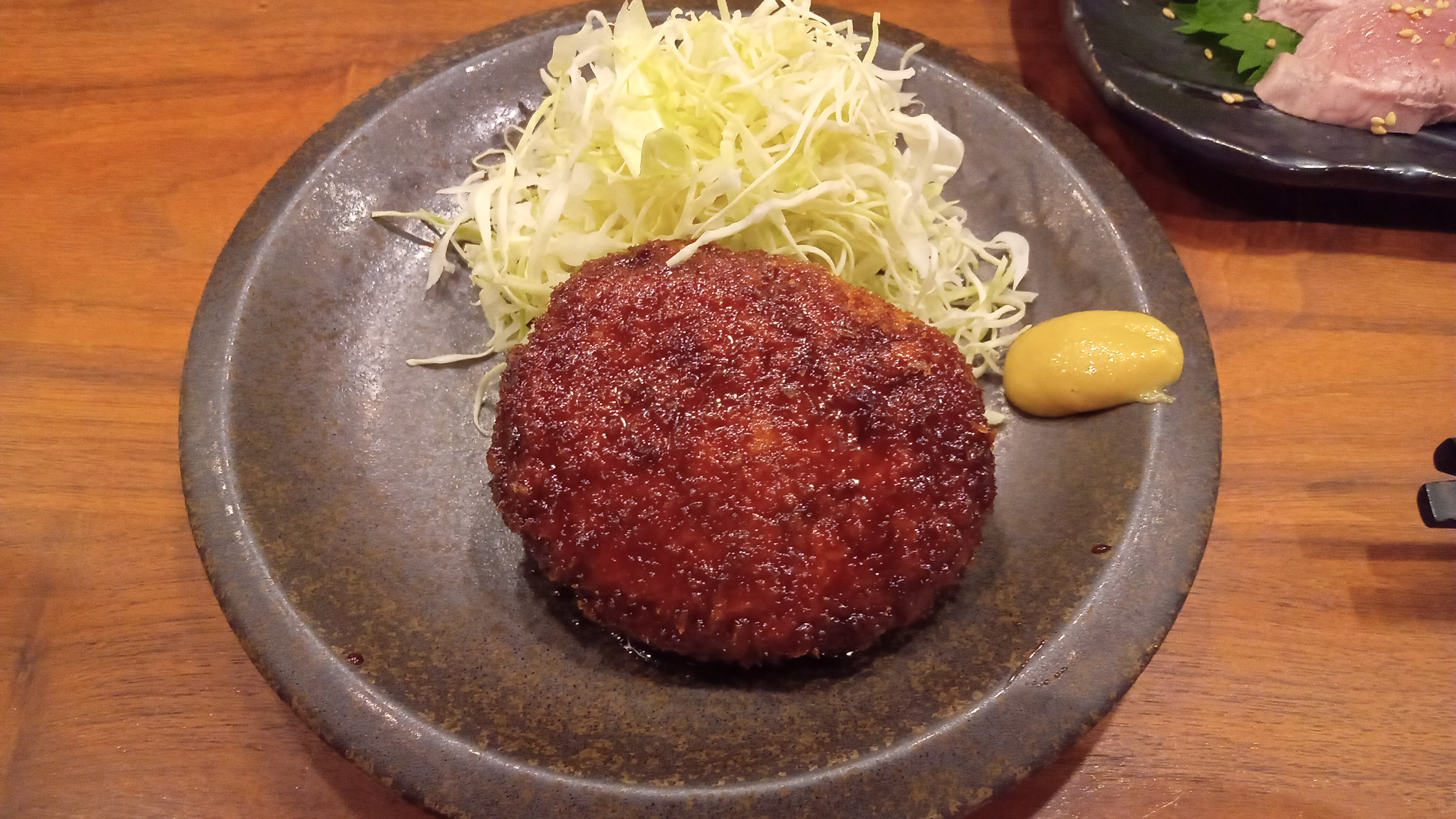

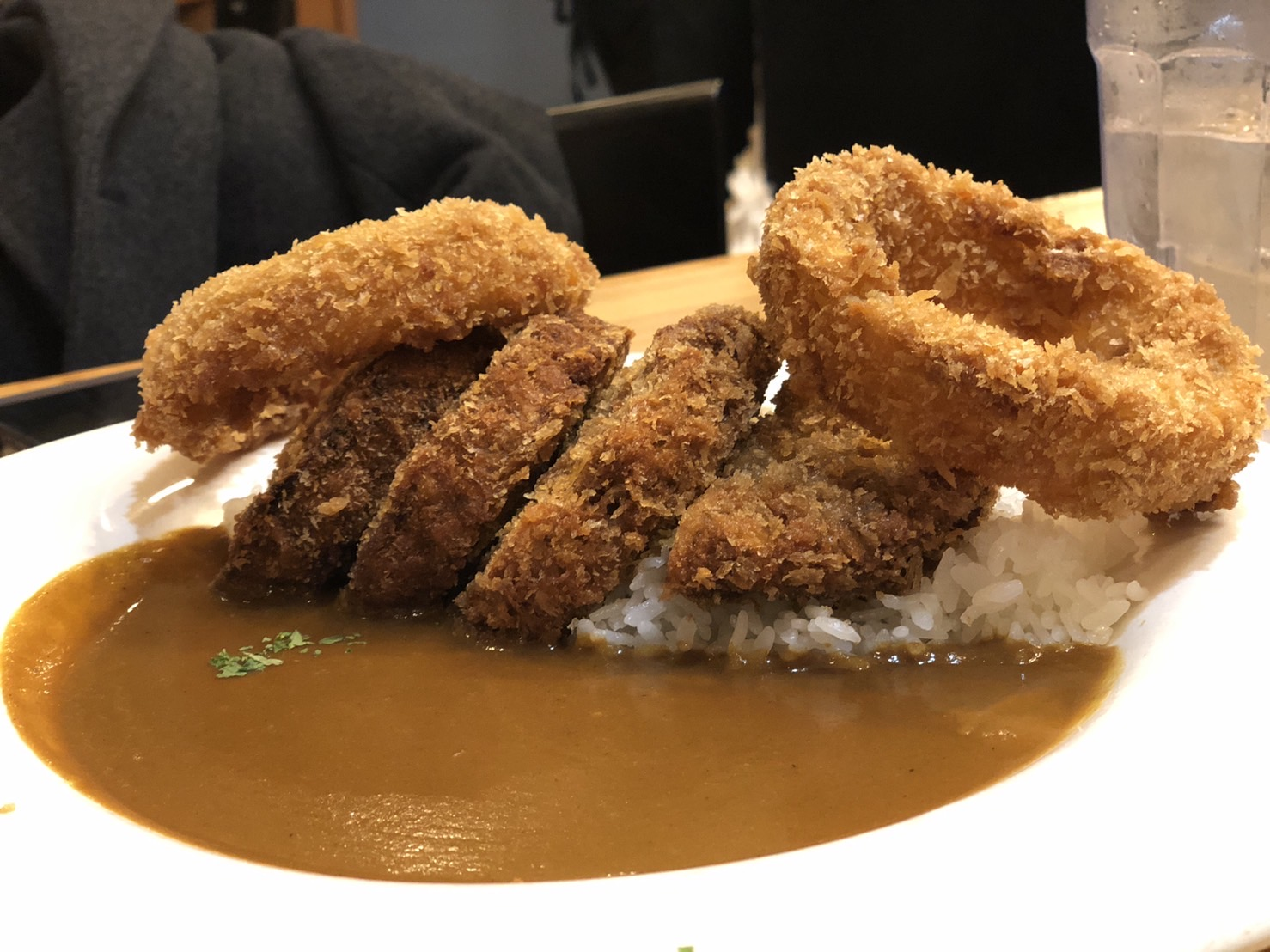

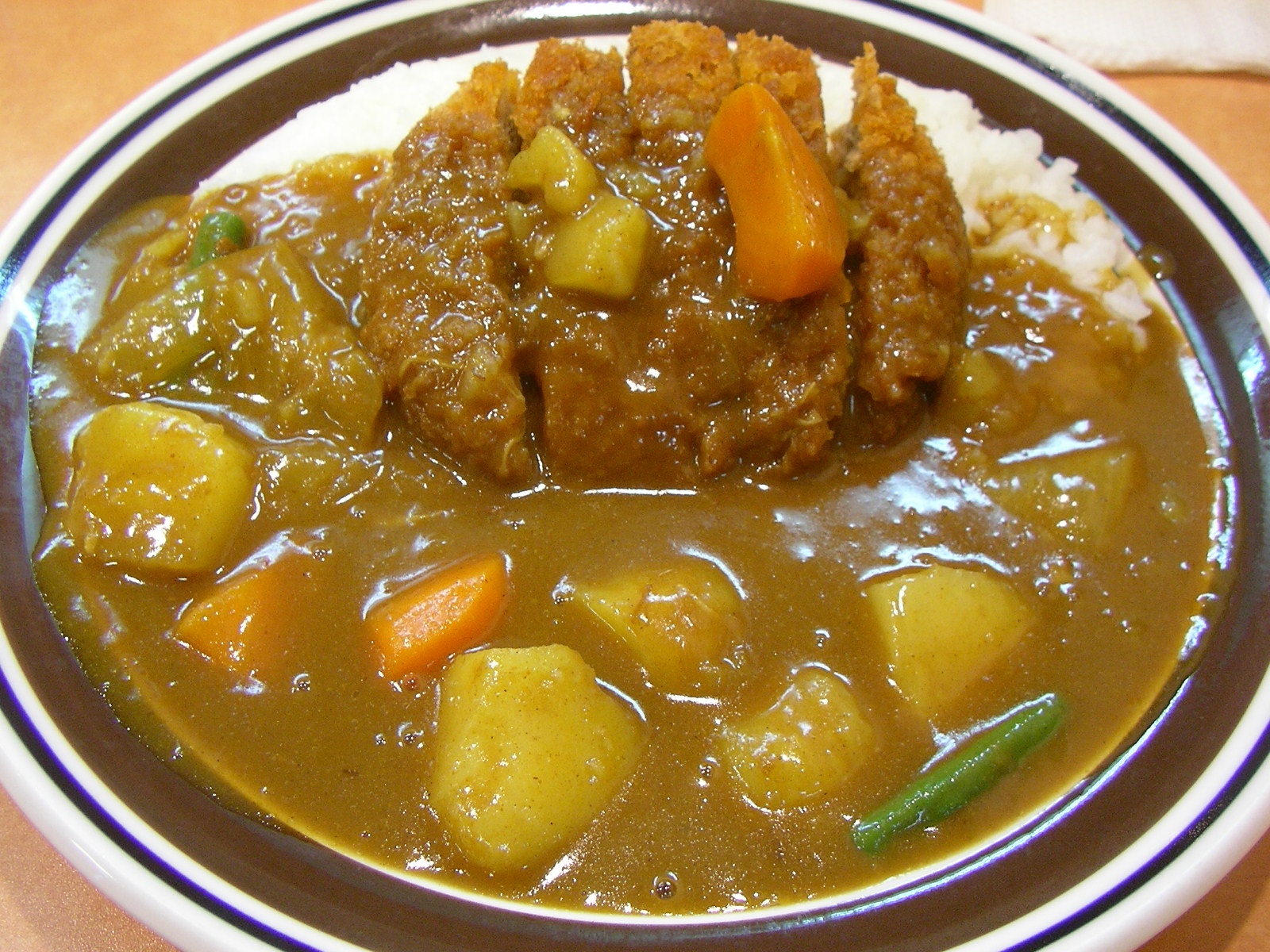

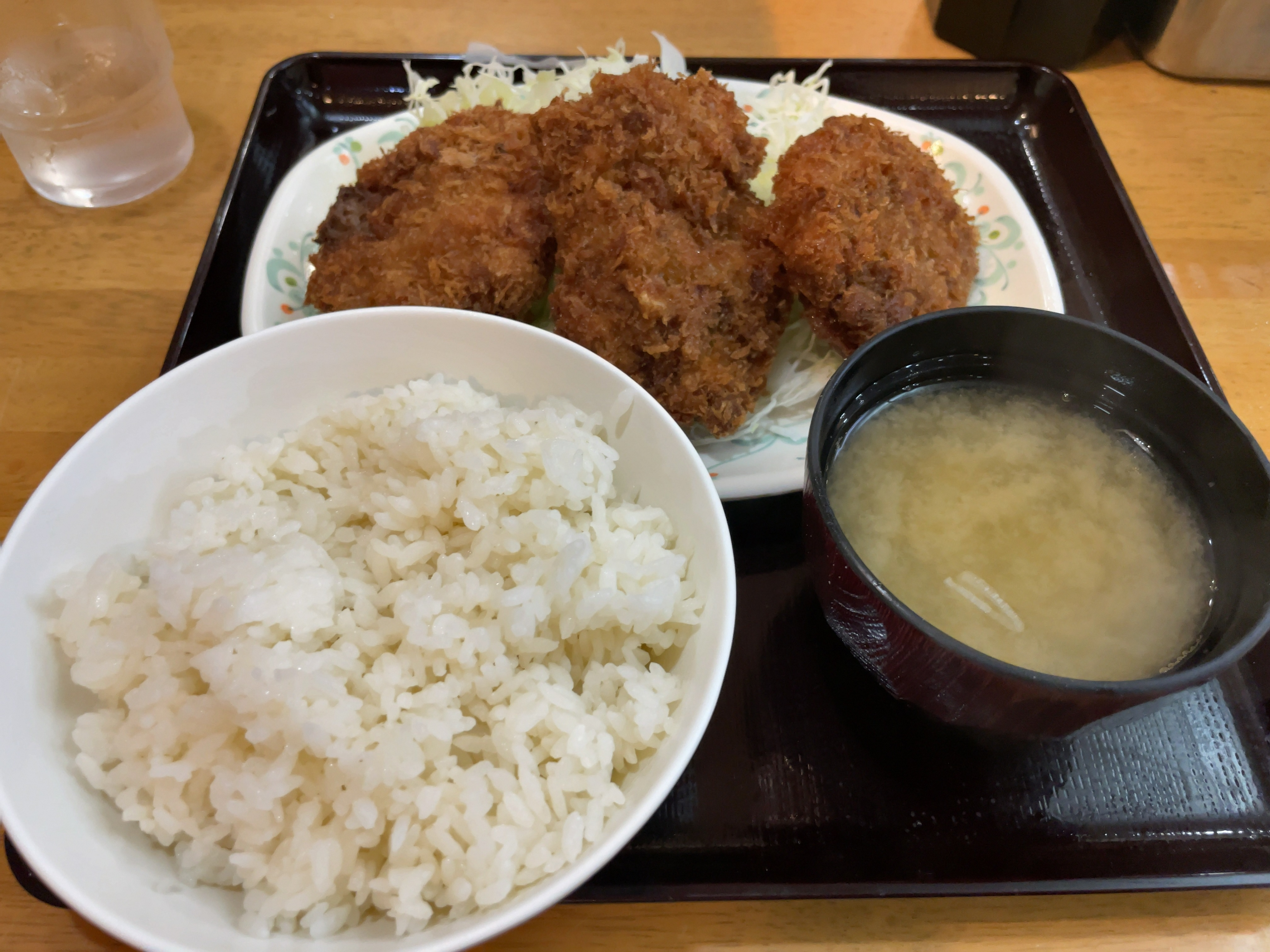

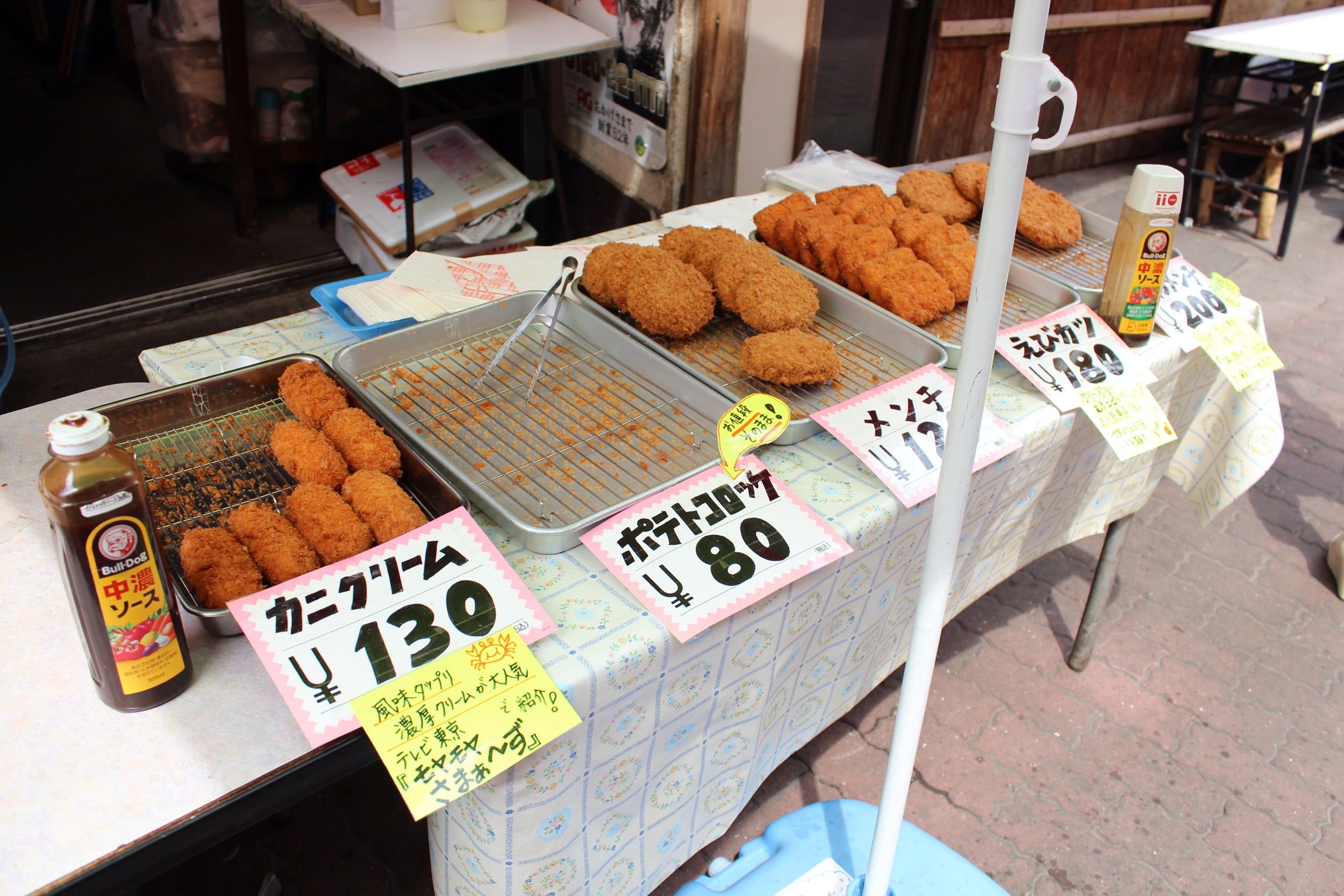

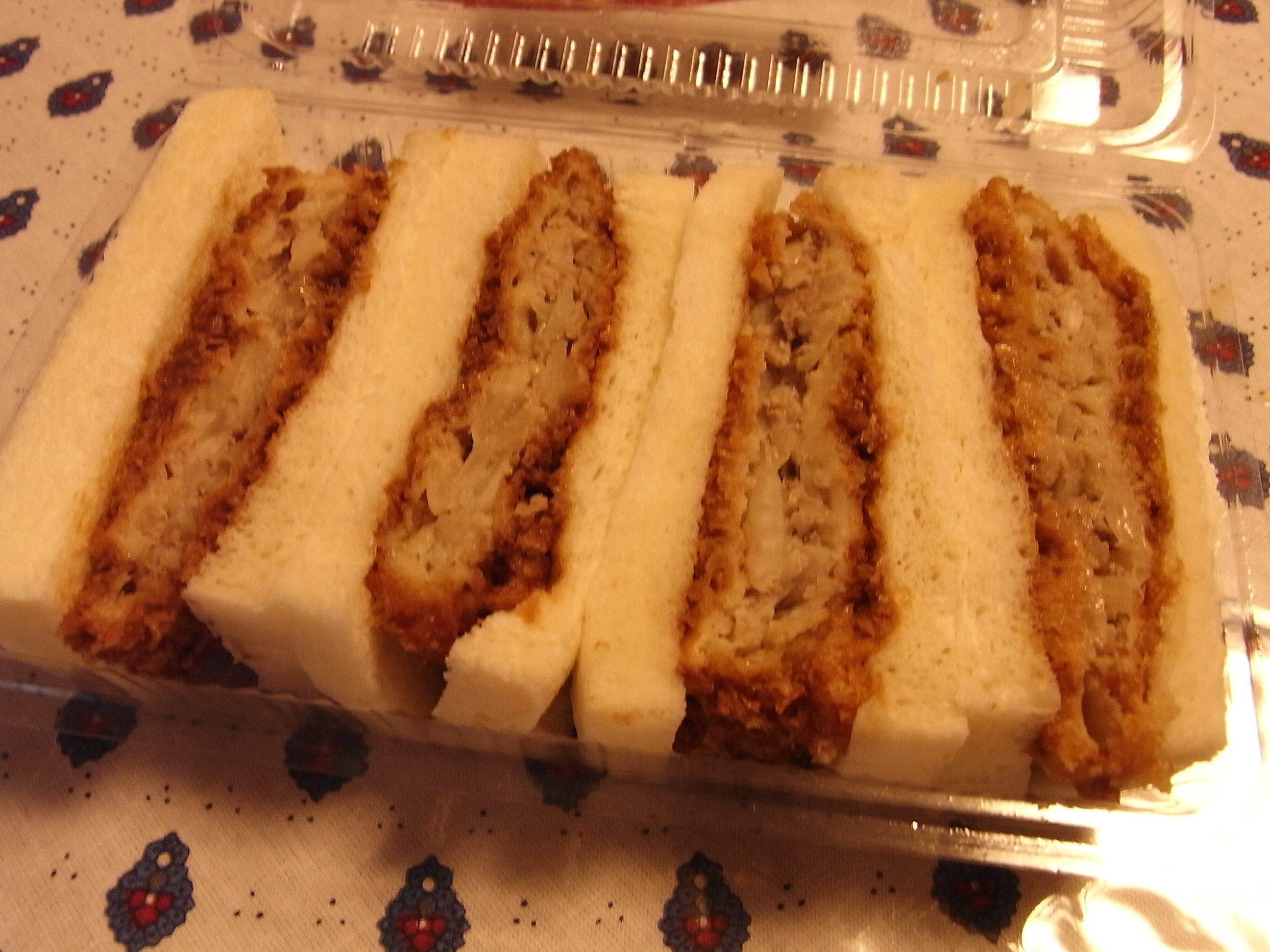

== See also ==
- Kofta
- List of deep fried foods
