= Chicken katsu curry =

Chicken katsu curry may refer to:

- Katsu curry
- Japanese curry
- Chicken katsu
