= House Foods =

Japanese food manufacturer

House Foods Group Inc.

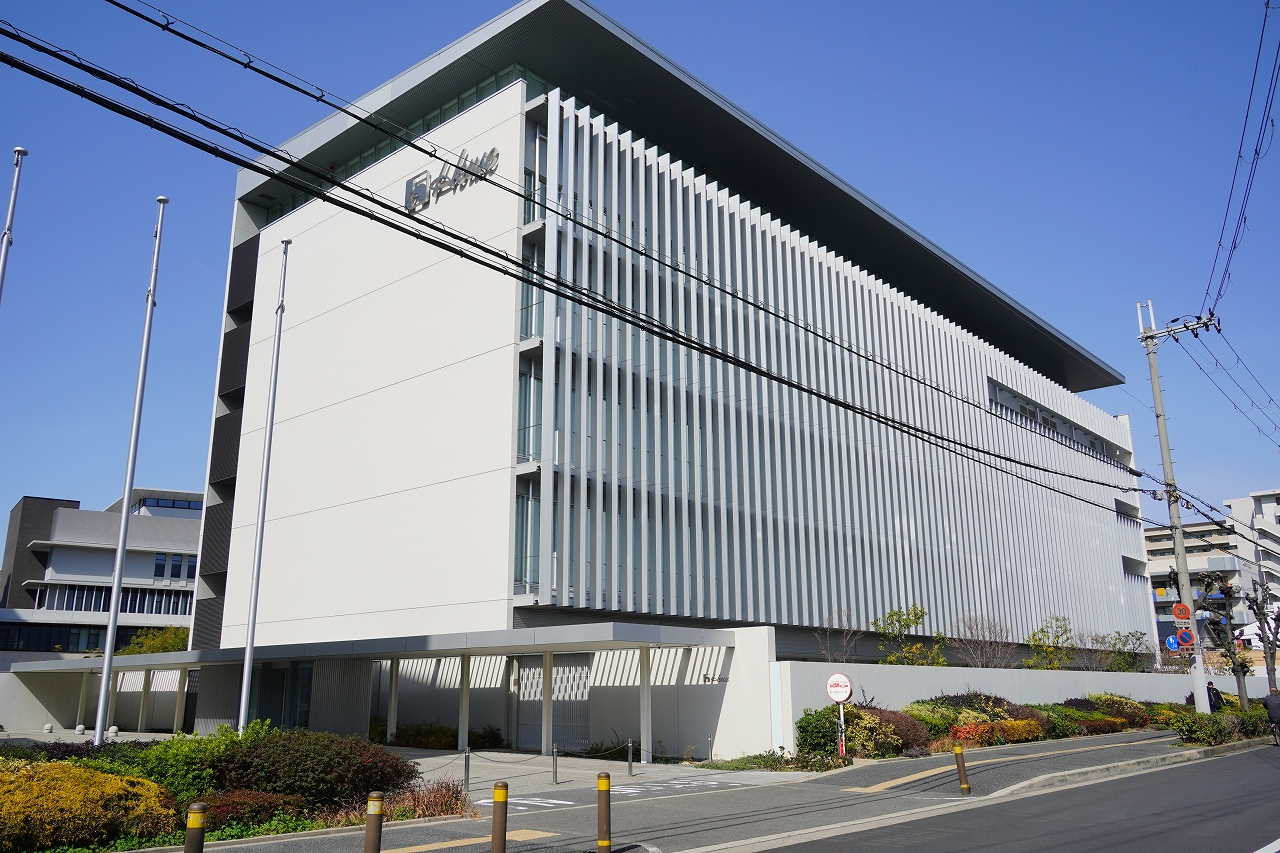
- House Foods head office
- Native name: ハウス食品グループ本社株式会社
- Romanized name: Hausu Shokuhin Gurūpu Honsha Kabushiki-gaisha
- Formerly: Urakami Shoten (1913–1947); Urakami Grain Industry (1947–1949); House Foods Urakami Shoten (1949–1960); House Food Industry (1960–1993); House Foods Corporation (1993–2013)
- Type: Public (K.K)
- Traded as: TYO: 2810
- ISIN: JP3765400001
- Industry: Food
- Founded: November 11, 1913; 113 years ago as Urakami Shoten
- Founder: Seisuke Urakami
- Headquarters: Higashiōsaka, Osaka, 577-8520, Japan
- Area served: Worldwide
- Key people: Hiroshi Urakami (President)
- Products: Spices; Seasonings; Retort pouched food; Health food
- Revenue: ▲JPY 293.7 billion (FY 2020) (US$ 2.8 billion) (FY 2020)
- Net income: ▲JPY 11.5 billion (FY 2020) (US$ 108 million) (FY 2020)
- Number of employees: 6,122 (consolidated, March 31, 2020)
- Website: Official website

House Foods Group Inc. (Japanese: ハウス食品グループ本社株式会社, Hepburn: Hausu Shokuhin Gurūpu Honsha Kabushiki-gaisha) is one of Japan's largest food manufacturers and brands. It began in 1913 in Osaka as Urakami Shoten and began selling curry in 1926.

House Foods is the world's largest manufacturer of Japanese curry, and is well known for its Japanese curry brands, Vermont Curry and Java Curry. It is also a manufacturer of spices such as wasabi, shichimi, yuzukoshō, and black pepper. In addition, House Foods manufactures mixes and roux for various yōshoku including cream stew, beef stew, chowder, Hayashi rice, mabo tofu, sundōbu-chige, Bolognese sauce, oden broth, fried rice, hamburger, and gratin; instant ramen such as Umakacchan; snacks such as Tongari Corn and potato chips; desserts such as Fruiche, pudding, sherbet, and jelly; and drinks such as oolong tea, mugicha, and lassi.

The company also owns Ichibanya, a Japanese curry restaurant with over 1,400 outlets around the world, and operates the Hungry Bear Restaurant at Tokyo Disneyland and the Casbah Food Court at Tokyo DisneySea. House Foods also engages in food technology, notably developing the tear-free onion Smile Ball (Goldies in the US), created by removing the tear-producing lachrymatory agent syn-propanethial-S-oxide, which won its creators the 2013 Ig Nobel Prize in Chemistry.

House Foods has also collaborated with rentertainers such as Arashi, Hey! Say! JUMP, AKB48, Nogizaka46, Takuya Kimura and Masahiro Nakai of SMAP, Tsubasa Honda, Hikaru Nishida, Rurouni Kenshin: The Final Actress Emi Takei, former leader of Morning Musume Miki Fujimoto, and Gen Hoshino. As a sponsor of TV programs, House Foods is known for the World Masterpiece Theater on Fuji TV.

== Subsidiaries ==
Its subsidiary House Foods America Corporation is the largest provider of tofu products in the United States.

House Foods America Corp. has tofu plants in California and New Jersey with a combined capacity of manufacturing 350,000 pieces of tofu per day. Its largest competitor in the U.S. tofu market is Vitasoy, followed by Morinaga Milk Industry.

House Foods America Corp. formerly operated the Japanese curry restaurant chain Curry House. It had nine locations across California. Its first opened at Weller Court Shopping Center in Little Tokyo, Los Angeles in 1983. House Foods sold Curry House in 2019. Its new owners closed the chain permanently on Monday, February 24, 2020.

In 2016, House Foods acquired Ichibanya which operates Japan's largest curry restaurant chain, Curry House CoCo ICHIBANYA, with over 1400 outlets across the United States, Thailand, Indonesia, Singapore, China, Taiwan, Malaysia, Hong Kong, South Korea, Vietnam, the United Kingdom, the Philippines, and Japan and soon India. It also operates a spaghetti chain Pasta de Coco.

In addition, House Foods produces high-end and commercial spices through its subsidiaries Gaban and Asaoka Spice, vitamin drinks such as C1000 (飲料), popular anti-hangover drink Ukon no chikara, and health products such as Immuno-LP20 under its subsidiary House Wellness Foods, cellophane noodles or vermicelli through its subsidiary Malony, meat substitute food products and salsa through its subsidiary El Burrito Mexican Food Products Corporation, MRE convenience store food products in Japan such as bread, spaghetti, salad, cream puff, crème brûlée, and bento through its subsidiary Delica Chef, vitamin drinks in Thailand through its subsidiary House Osotspa Foods, and engages in the import and export of food products and agricultural commodities through Vox Trading.
