= Curry House (restaurant chain) =

American restaurant chain (1983–2020)

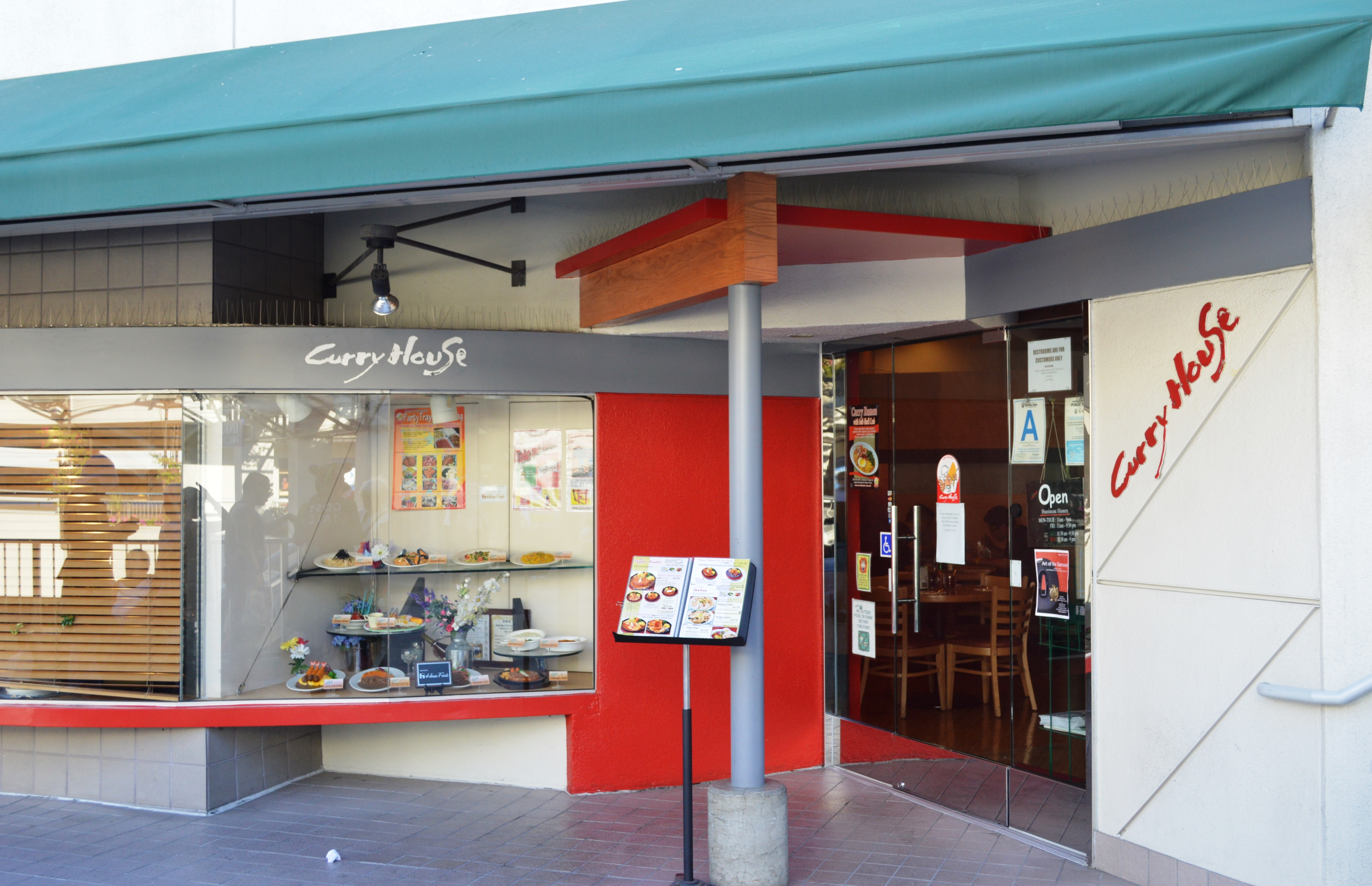
- Entrance to the flagship Curry House restaurant in the Little Tokyo neighborhood of Los Angeles
- Industry: Foodservice
- Founded: 1983; 43 years ago in Los Angeles
- Founder: House Foods
- Defunct: February 24, 2020; 5 years ago
- Number of locations: 9
- Area served: California
- Products: Japanese curry, yōshoku
- Owners: House Foods (1983–2019); CH Acquisitions, LLC (2019–2020)
- Website: Last snapshot of official website at the Wayback Machine (archived 2019-12-13)

Curry House (Japanese: カレーハウス/カレーの館, Hepburn: Karē hausu/Karē no yakata) was a Japanese curry restaurant based in California. It was founded in 1983 by House Foods, which operated it until 2019. After the success of the first location in the Little Tokyo neighborhood of Los Angeles, the chain expanded across California. Its menu and choice of aesthetics were praised by Jonathan Gold and Rudi Gernreich, among others. Curry House offered a line of instant curries and collaborated on promotions with Sanrio. In 2019 CH Acquisitions purchased Curry House; they closed it down permanently on February 24, 2020.

== History ==
=== Beginnings ===
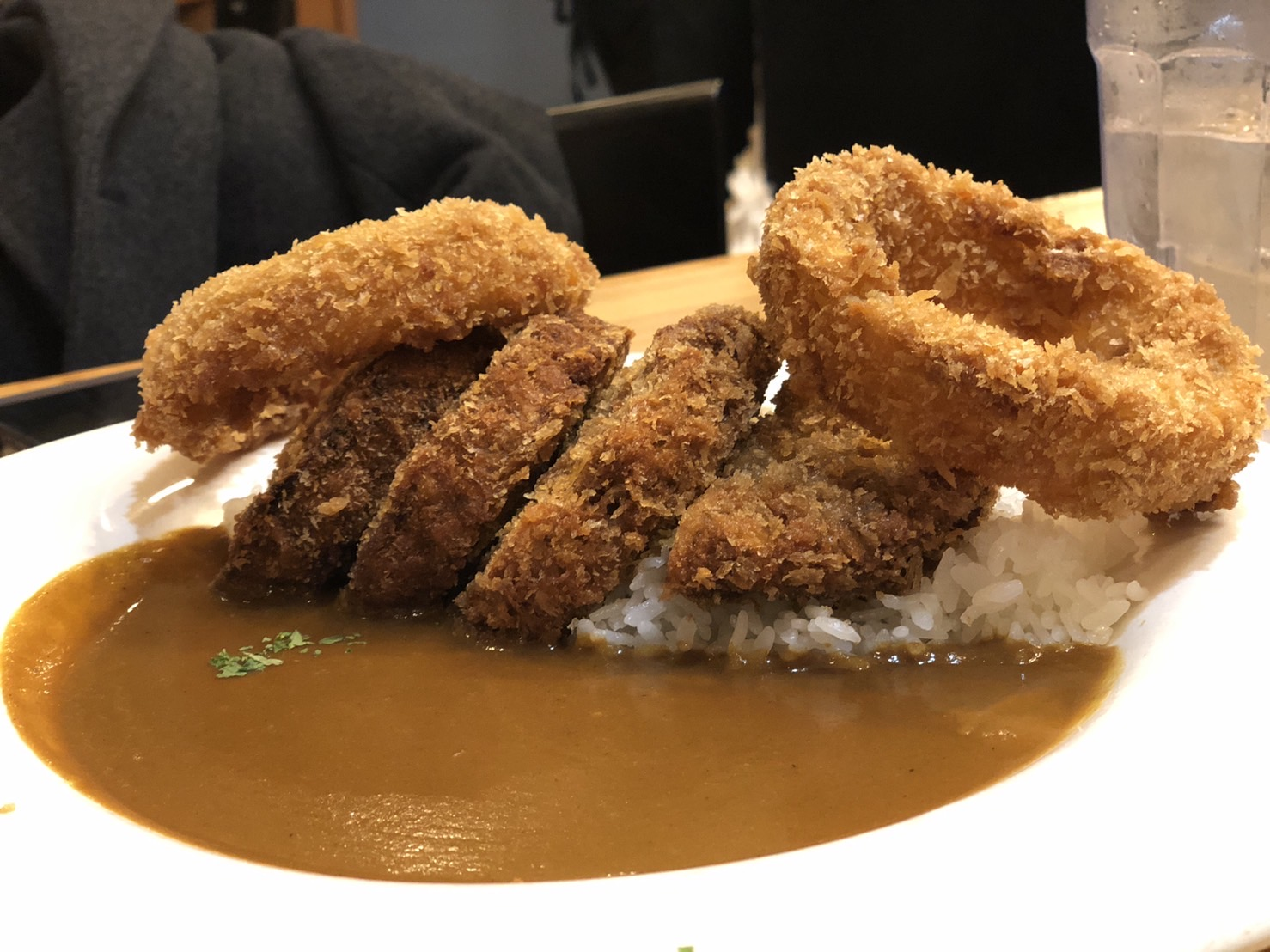
Plate of Curry House curry rice topped with menchi katsu and onion rings

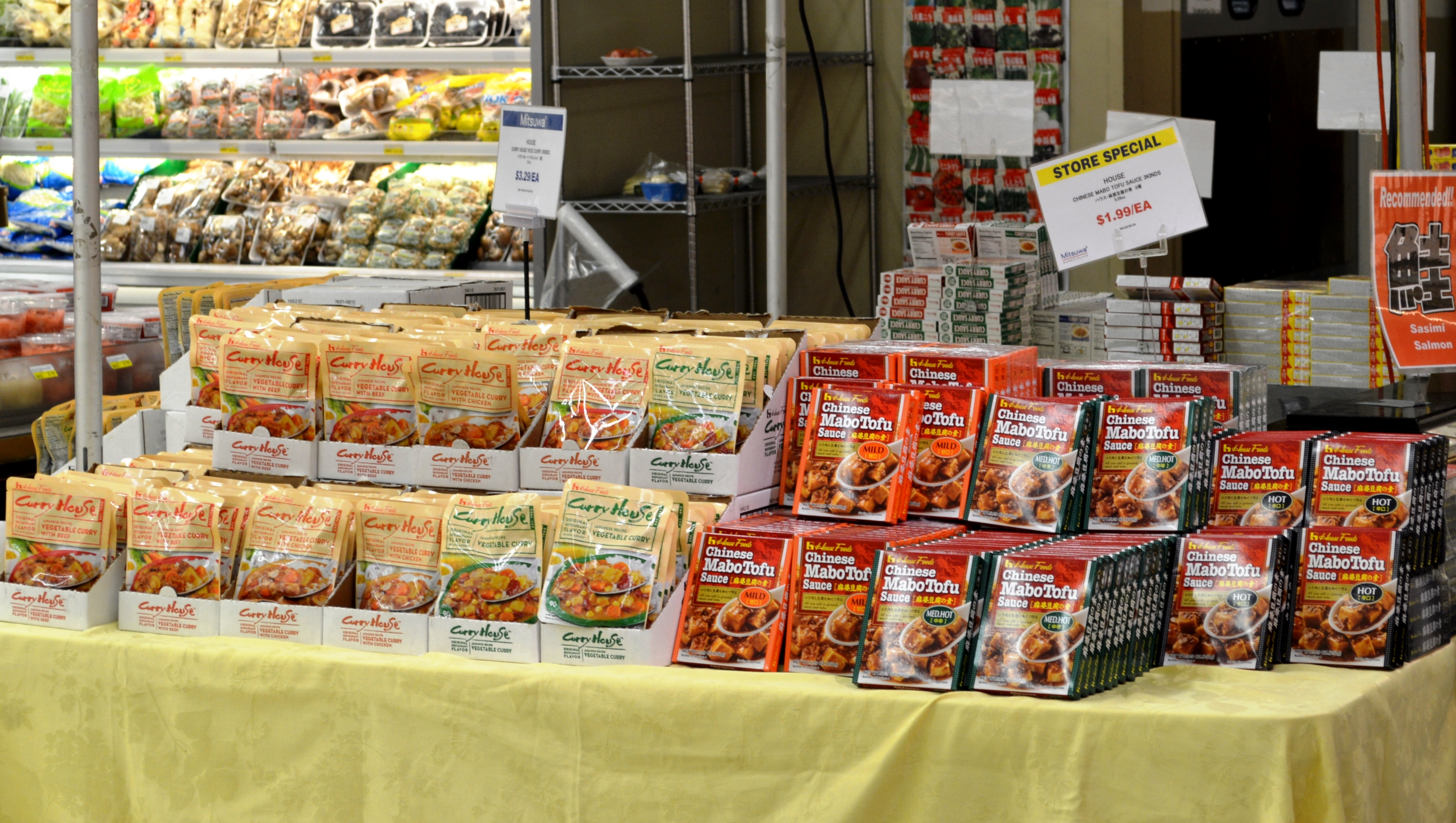
Curry House brand instant curry pouches (left) on display at the Mitsuwa Marketplace in Costa Mesa

Curry House was founded in 1983 as a division of House Foods America, with the first location opening in the Weller Court complex in the Little Tokyo neighborhood of Los Angeles. The location drew the attention of Rose Dosti of the Los Angeles Times and Rudi Gernreich, both of whom praised the restaurant's aesthetics and "hip, graphic design" food presentation:

Curry House, on the top floor of Downtown's Weller Court, is probably the first of its type in Los Angeles, but likely a prototype of clones to come, if instant success is any measure. It's a scientific, Japanese curry-and-spaghetti house—small, well-designed, handsome, and efficient in a tradition-bound Japanese, not Western, manner. You get the feeling you are culturally in Japan even though you are physically in California.

In 1984, the LA Weekly designated Curry House as the "Best Japanese-Style Curry" in Los Angeles.

=== Expansion ===
Curry House opened a location in Beverly Hills, next to the Hotel Nikko (today the SLS Hotel), in 1996. According to Max Jacobson of the Los Angeles Times, the location was "by far the most attractive" of the entire chain:

Like Japanese curry itself, the ambience is an amalgam of elements that might not seem to belong together: frosted glass, a Japanese flower arrangement offset by a lacquered wooden backdrop, cobalt-blue Diva lights, cool jazz on the sound system, and a team of waitresses who take care of you with disarming sincerity.

In 1998, Jonathan Gold reviewed the location for the LA Weekly, calling it a "slick, highly designed restaurant [...], a soaring space with acres of blond wood and bright paintings on the wall."

A 2003 article in the Los Angeles Downtown News named Curry House among the "best-loved spots and hidden treasures" in Downtown Los Angeles.

Over the course of its history the chain grew to 9 locations across California. The Little Tokyo location also opened an annex for take-out orders in 2011, located downstairs from the main restaurant, next to a Marukai Market. In addition to Japanese curry, Curry House also sold other kinds of yōshoku including Naporitan, tonkatsu, menchi katsu, and hamburg.

In 2017, Curry House collaborated with Sanrio on a limited-edition meal set featuring the Gudetama character. The $29 set included a collectible placemat and beanie. The collaboration originated from Sanrio; an employee who regularly dined at Curry House said he got the idea after eating one of their egg-topped curry dishes.

House Foods also sold a line of instant curries in retort pouches that was branded under the Curry House name.

=== Ownership under CH Acquisitions and closure ===
In June 2019, House Foods sold Curry House to CH Acquisitions, LLC; with Food Management Partners, Inc. of Texas running the chain's daily operation. Four years before, House Foods had purchased CoCo Ichibanya and made it a subsidiary. The new owners immediately fired most of its personnel, including 90% of its kitchen workers, forcing the chain to temporarily close while it hired and trained new staff. The same year that the change in ownership occurred, Food Management Partners' three co-founders and an executive had been sued in court. The plaintiff in that case alleged that the defendants siphoned $12 million to themselves in order to purchase "exotic cars, boats, homes, and foreign travel."

On February 24, 2020, CH Acquisitions and Food Management Partners closed down Curry House. The former stated in a press release that the "misrepresentation of the legal status of many [Curry House] employees" and the resultant "confusion" caused by the need to temporarily shut down the restaurants in order to train new staff were factors in their decision. According to reports, the chain's parent company had given staff no warning of their decision.

== Locations ==
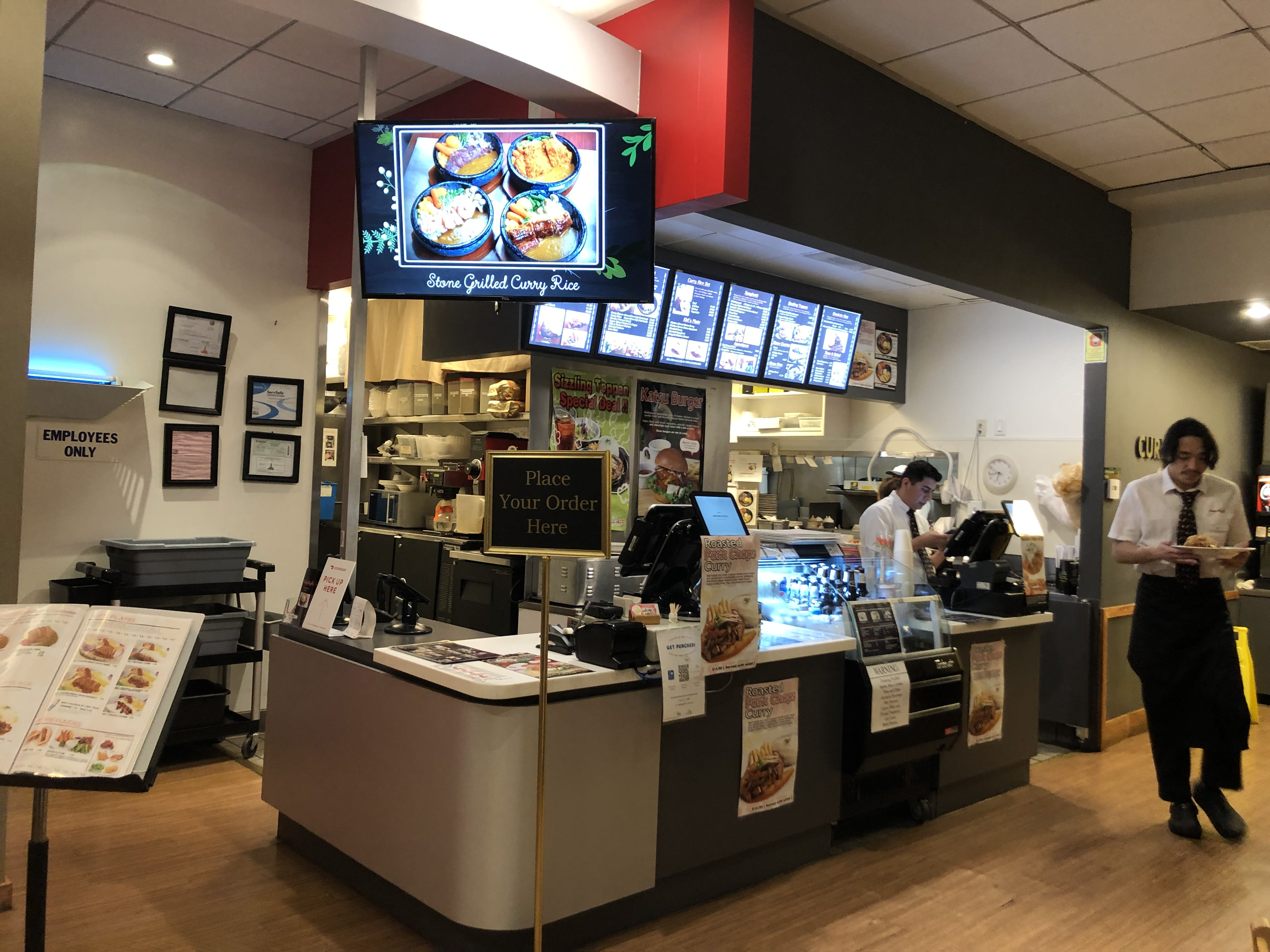
Counter area of the Curry House in Sawtelle, March 2019

Los Angeles County

- Beverly Hills
- City of Industry
- Gardena
- Los Angeles
  - Little Tokyo
  - Koreatown
  - Sawtelle
- Monterey Park
- Torrance

Orange County

- Cypress

San Diego County

- San Diego
  - Kearny Mesa

Santa Clara County

- Cupertino
