= S&B =

S&B may refer to:

- Schmidt & Bender
- S&B Foods, Japanese company
