= Curry rice =

Curry rice may refer to any rice dish prepared with curry:

- Rice and curry (Sri Lanka), a popular dish in Sri Lanka
- a type of Japanese curry (カレーライス, karē raisu)
- Nasi kari, an Indian-Indonesian rice dish
- Dal bhat, a lentil and rice dish in South Asia
