= Tasty Bite =

Indian-American preserved food

Tasty Bite Eatables
- Company type: Public
- Traded as: NSE: TASTYBITE; BSE: 519091
- Industry: Consumer packaged goods
- Founded: 1995
- Headquarters: Pune, India; Stamford, Connecticut, United States
- Key people: Ashok Vasudevan (Chief Executive)
- Products: Ready-to-eat meals, noodles, rice
- Parent: Mars, Incorporated
- Subsidiaries: Tasty Bite Edibles, Ltd.
- Website: tastybite.com

Tasty Bite is an Indian-American preserved food manufacturer, producing ready-to-eat Indian and pan-Asian food products. The products require no refrigeration.

Tasty Bite was founded in 1996. Its products are available in every state in the U.S. and are sold in most American grocery chains. In August 2017, a majority of the owner company of Tasty Bite was acquired by Mars, Incorporated.

== Preparation and packaging ==
Tasty Bite meals are sealed in a multi-layer retort pouch and have a shelf life of up to 18 months. During the manufacturing process, the pouches are filled with food, sealed, and cooked in a retort oven under high temperature and pressure.

Tasty Bite products are manufactured at its Bhandgaon plant in India. The vegetables used are partially grown on a private farm owned and managed by the company, though the rest of the vegetables are procured through traders from local markets.
