= Rice and curry (Sri Lanka) =

Popular dish in Sri Lanka

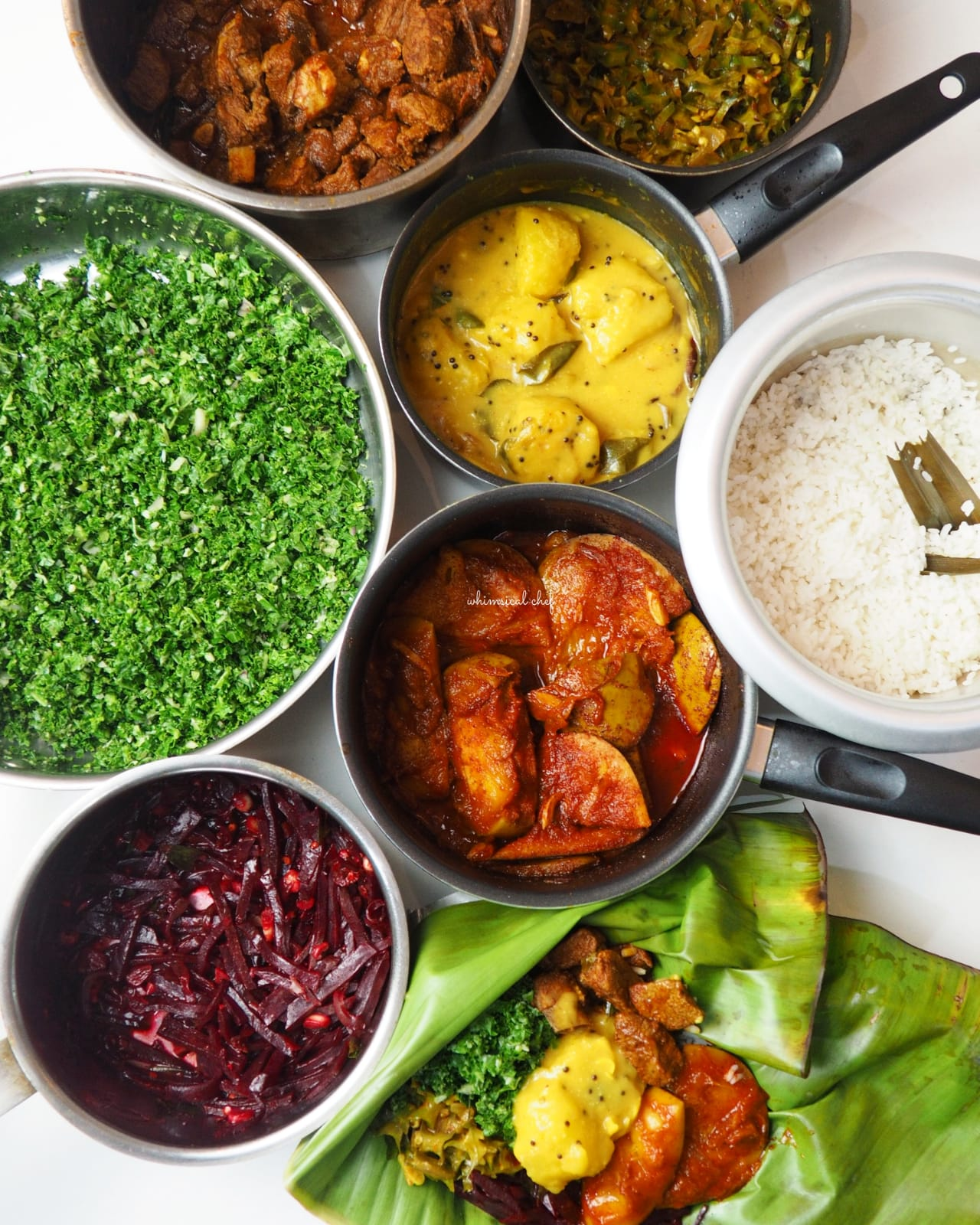
- A Sri Lankan rice and curry meal consisting of cassava curry, curried lamb, stir-fried beetroot, stir-fried winged beans, raw mango curry and kale mallum
- Type: Curry
- Main ingredients: Rice or kiribath, vegetable or meat curry, spices (chili peppers, cardamom, cumin, coriander)

Rice and curry is a popular combination meal in Sri Lanka, as well as in other parts of the Indian subcontinent.

A meal of rice and curry comprises the following:

- A large bowl of rice, can be boiled or fried. Sometimes kiribath, rice cooked in coconut milk, is served.
- A vegetable curry, perhaps of green beans, jackfruit or leeks.
- A curry of meat, most often chicken or fish but occasionally goat or lamb
- Dhal, a dish of spiced lentils.
- Papadums, a thin crisp wafer made from legume or rice flour and served as a side dish.
- Sambals, which are fresh chutney side dishes; they may include red onion, chili, grated coconut and lime juice, and are often the hottest part of the meal.

Each bowl contains small portions, but as is traditional in most countries in tropical Asia, if a bowl is emptied, it is immediately refilled.

The curry uses chili peppers, cardamom, cumin, coriander and other spices. It has a distinctive taste. The Southern cuisines use ingredients like dried fish which are local to the area.

While natives are born into this cuisine and develop a tolerance to spicy food, many visitors and tourists to the country often find the spiciness excessive. As a result, many local restaurants in developed and tourist areas offer special low-spice versions of local foods to cater to foreign palates or have an alternative "Western" menu for visitors and tourists.

== See also ==
- Appam
- Adobo
- Japanese curry
- List of fried rice dishes
- Nasi kari
