= Curry bread =

Japanese curry-filled fried pastry

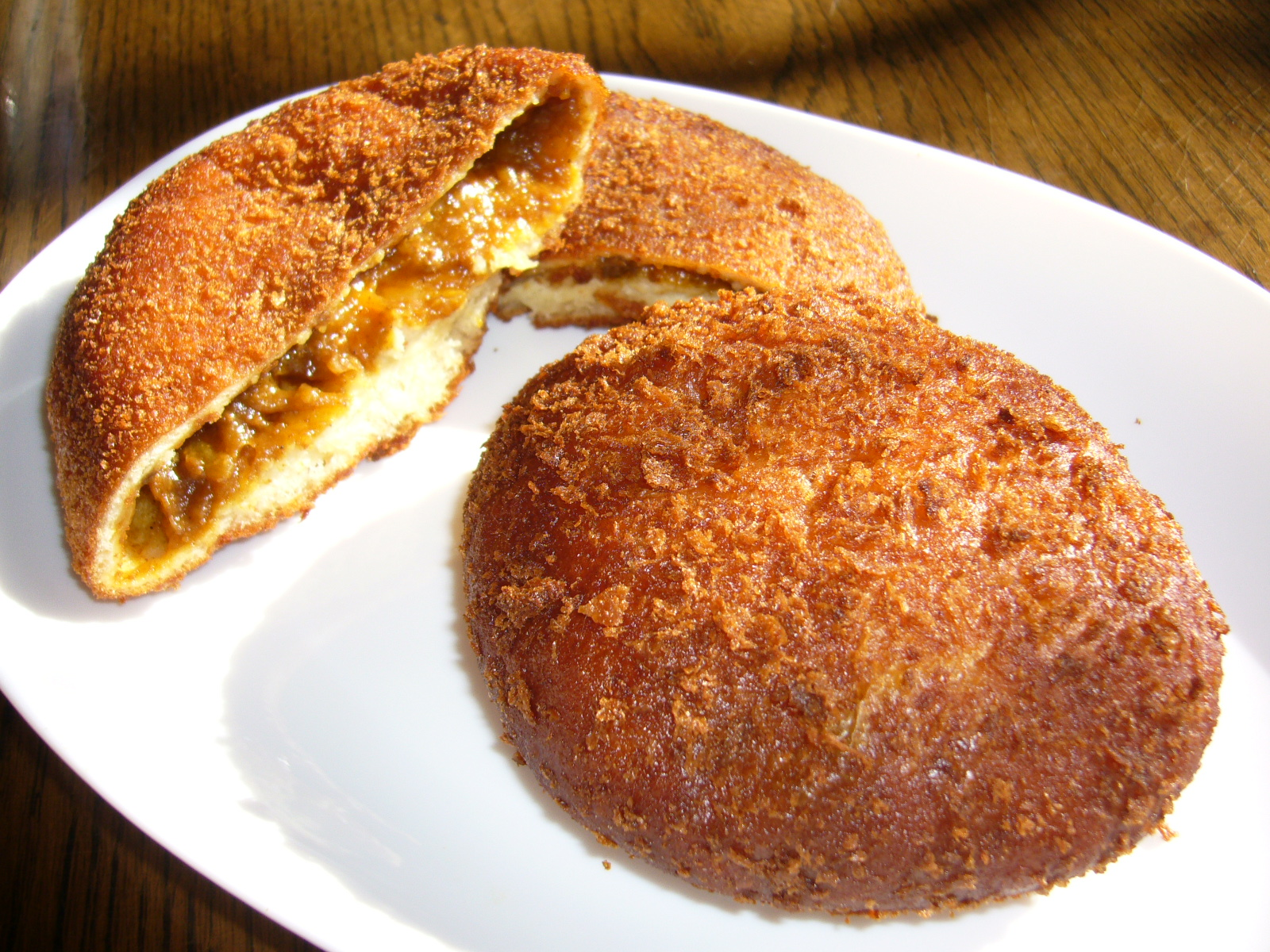
- Curry bread
- Alternative names: karē pan
- Type: Bread
- Place of origin: Japan
- Created by: Nakata Toyoharu (?)
- Invented: 1927 (?)
- Main ingredients: Dough, Japanese curry, bread crumbs

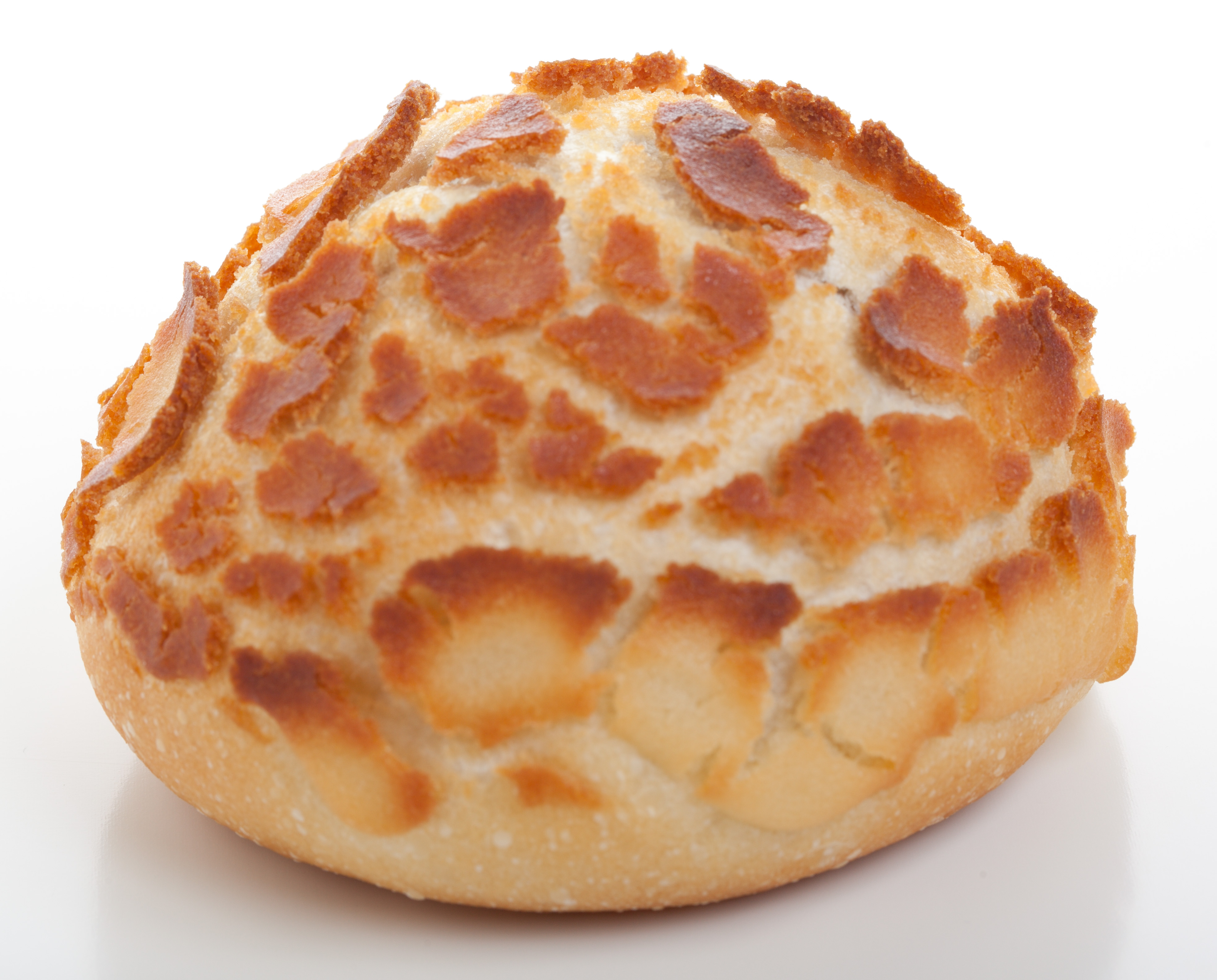
Yaki karē pan (baked curry bread)

Curry bread (カレーパン, karē pan) is a popular Japanese food consisting of Japanese curry (or other types of curry) wrapped in a piece of dough, which is then coated in bread crumbs and deep fried. On occasion it is baked instead of deep-fried, but deep-frying is the most common method of cooking. Curry bread is usually found in bakeries and convenience stores.

== History ==
The exact origin of curry bread in Japan is unknown, but it is often said that it was created in 1927 by a man named Nakata Toyoharu. It was during this time period that foods from Western countries were becoming popular in Japan and many businesses were experimenting with making Japanese-style Western dishes. As curry was introduced to Japan by Anglo-Indian Royal Navy officers, curry bread was originally called "Western food bread" (洋食パン, yōshoku pan) when it was first sold in Tokyo during the early Shōwa era. It eventually became widely referred to as "curry bread" (カレーパン, karē pan) due to its curry filling.

== In popular culture ==
Karē pan man (lit. 'Curry bread man') is one of the superheroes in Anpanman, with a head made out of curry bread. In addition to his special moves, "Curry Punch" and "Curry Kick", he also attacks by spraying hot curry from his mouth onto his opponent.

== See also ==
- Bunny chow – South African curry dish
- Curry puff – Pastry with curry filling
