= Katsu curry =

Japanese pork and rice curry dish

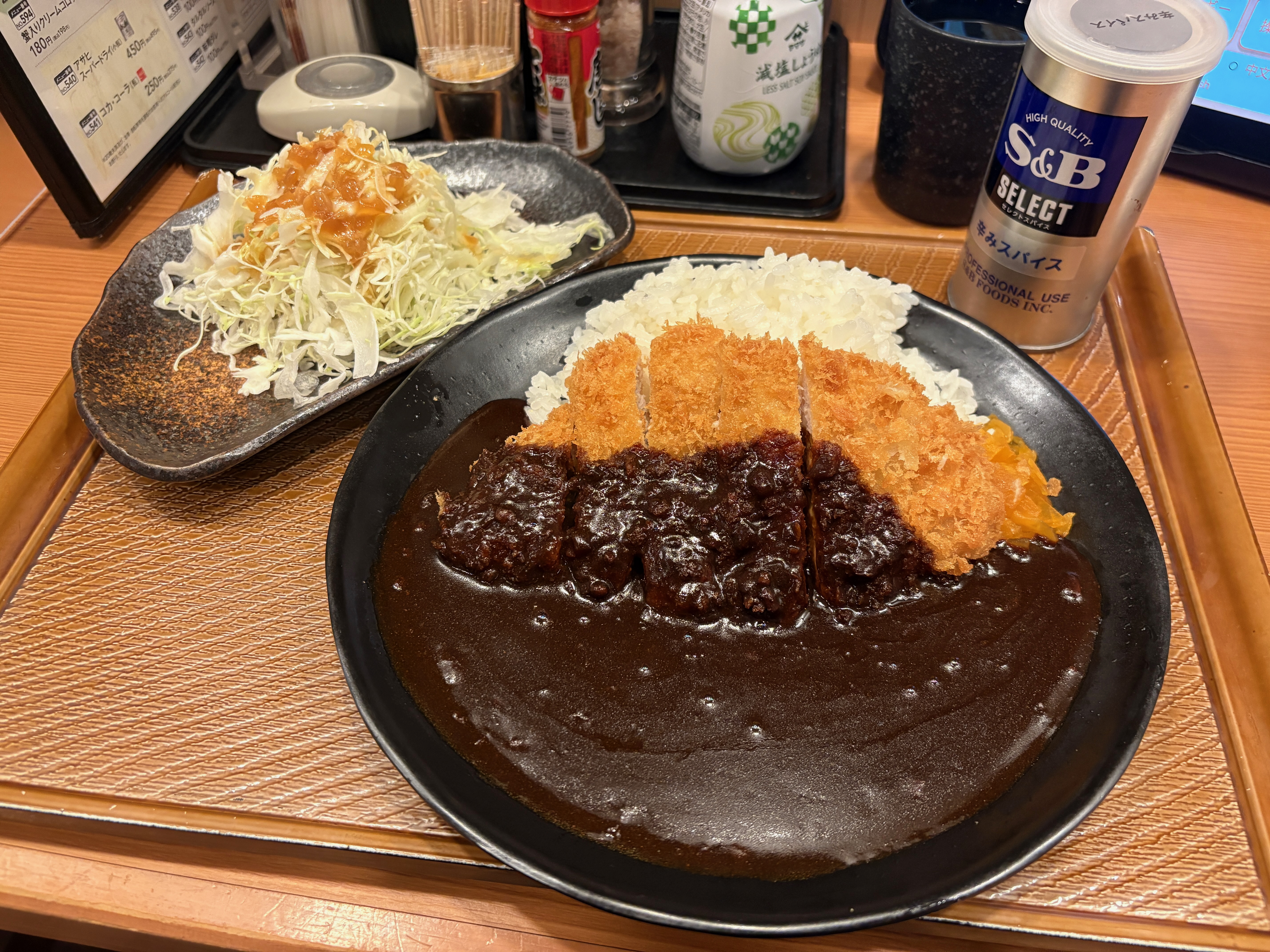
- Katsu curry with salad
- Alternative names: Katsukarē
- Course: Main
- Place of origin: Japan
- Invented: 1918 or 1921 or 1948
- Main ingredients: Tonkatsu, Japanese rice, Japanese curry

Katsu curry (Japanese: カツカレー, romanized: katsukarē) is a Japanese dish consisting of tonkatsu (pork cutlet) served with Japanese rice and curry. It is served on a large plate and is typically eaten using a spoon or fork. The cutlet is usually precut into strips, eliminating the need for a knife.

Generally eaten as a main course, the dish can be accompanied with fukujinzuke pickles and miso soup. In Japan, there are fast-food restaurant chains which specialize in serving katsu curry, with varying meats and types of curry. The pork cutlet can be substituted with chicken.

In Japan, the name refers exclusively to a dish of curry served with a cutlet; in contrast, in the United Kingdom, where katsu curry enjoyed a surge in popularity in the 2010s, the name is sometimes applied to any type of Japanese curry, with the curry itself sometimes referred to as "katsu sauce". Katsu curry's popularity in the UK appears to stem from the restaurant chain Wagamama, which first began serving it in 1992, and it has since become widely available at restaurants and supermarkets across the country.

== History ==
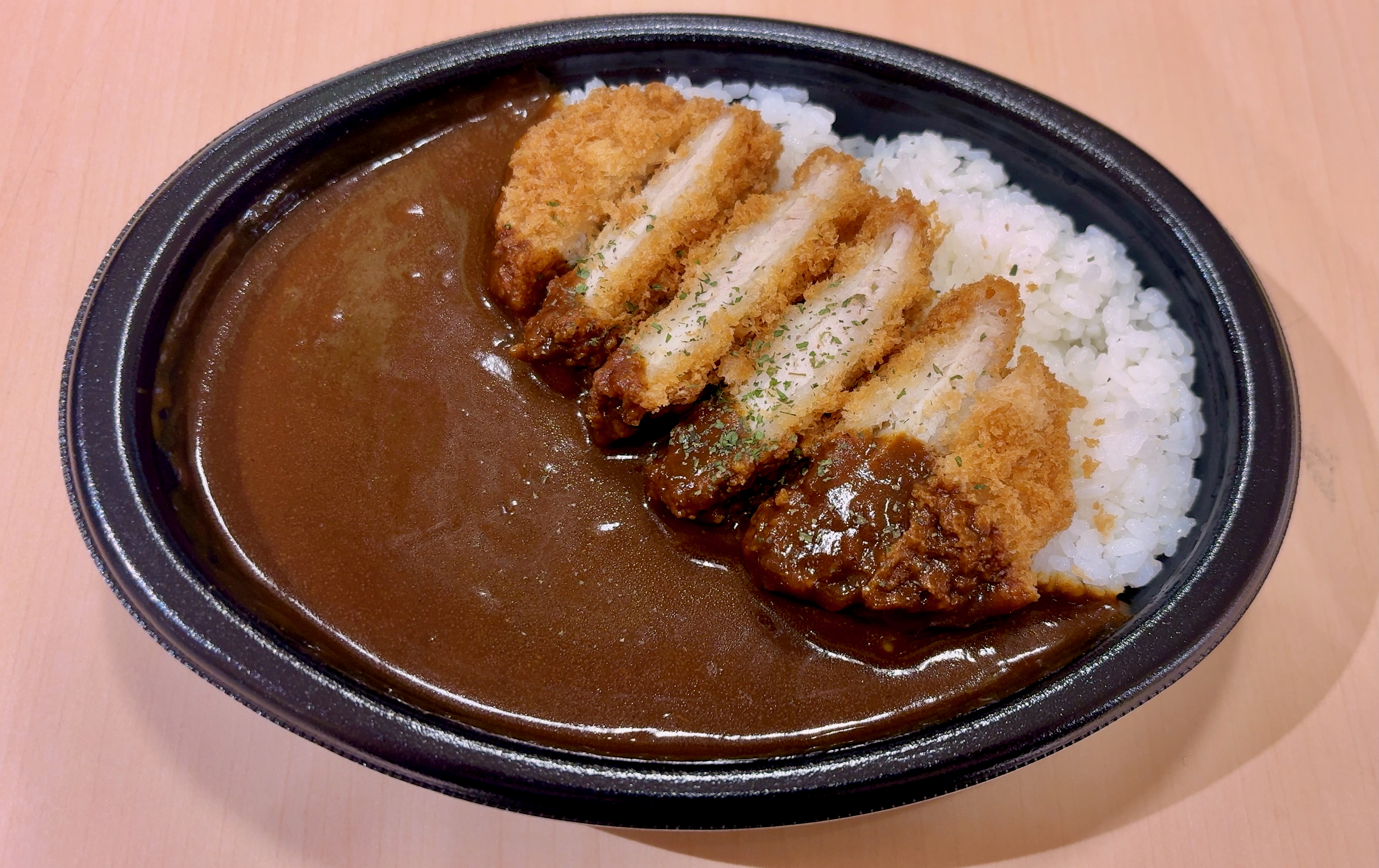
Katsu curry with pre-sliced tonkatsu

There are three restaurants that are said to have been the first to serve this dish. The first theory is that Kawakin (河金), a yōshoku yatai in Asakusa, Tokyo, served it in 1918, and the second theory is that Ōroji (王ろじ), a yōshoku restaurant in Shinjuku, Tokyo, served it in 1921.

The third theory is that Ginza Swiss (銀座スイス), a yōshoku restaurant in Ginza, Tokyo, served it in 1948. Yomiuri Giants player Shigeru Chiba, a frequent patron of the establishment, complained that it was too bothersome to eat curry and katsu separately, leading to the creation of the combination. Currently, the restaurant advertises the dish as the "original curry" and "Chiba-san's curry" on its menu.
