= Fukujinzuke =

Condiment in Japanese cuisine

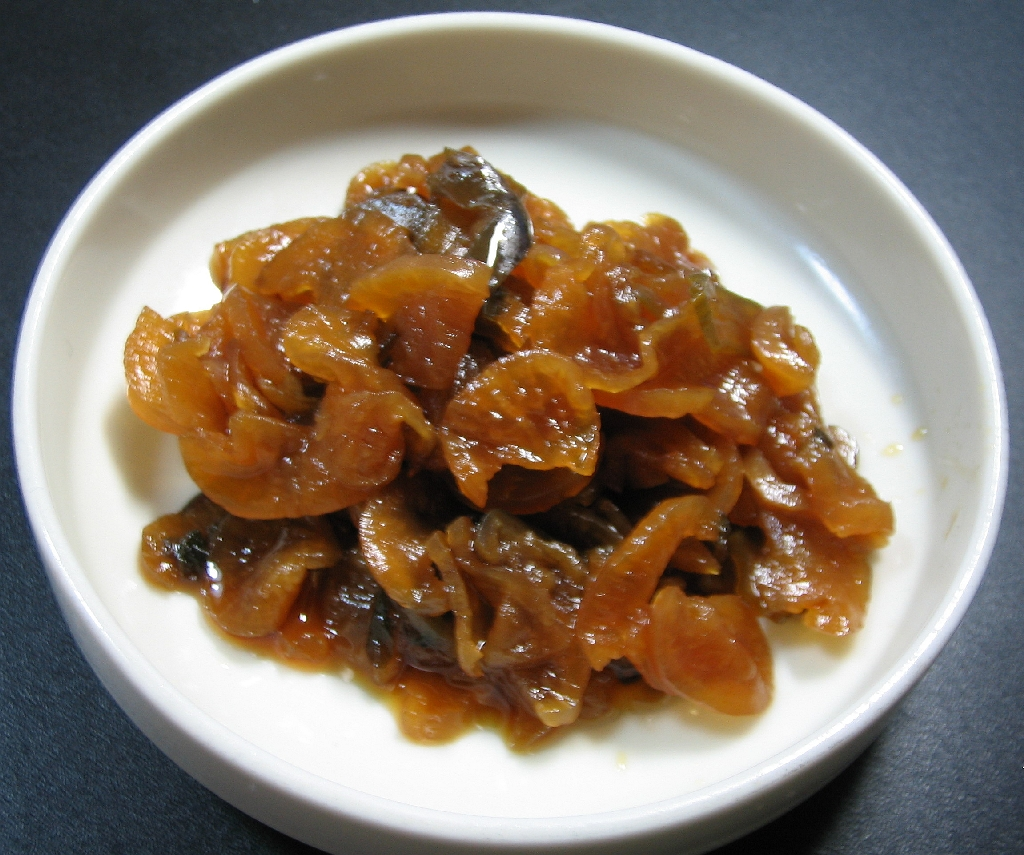
- Type: Condiment
- Place of origin: Japan
- Serving temperature: Warm
- Main ingredients: Daikon radish
- Ingredients generally used: Japanese eggplant
- Food energy (per 100 g serving): 85 kcal (360 kJ)
Nutritional value
(per 100 g serving)
- Protein: 3.24 g
- Fat: 0.12 g
- Carbohydrate: 40 g

Fukujinzuke (福神漬) is a condiment in Japanese cuisine, commonly used as relish for Japanese curry. In fukujinzuke, vegetables including daikon, eggplant, lotus root and cucumber are finely chopped, then pickled in a base that is flavored with soy sauce. The result has a crunchy texture.

== Relation to Japanese folklore ==
The name originates from the tale of Seven Lucky Gods. In homage to the name, some varieties of fukujinzuke consists of seven different kind of vegetables, adding sword beans, perilla, shiitake mushrooms and/or sesame seeds to the four main ingredients. Lotus root is sometimes replaced with the similarly sweet and crunchy carrot, and the red varieties often add sliced beetroot for color.

== See also ==
- Japanese curry – Japanese-style curry dish
- Kimchi – Korean side dish of fermented vegetables
- Tale of the Seven Lucky Gods – Japanese deities of good fortune
