= Ichibanya =

Japanese food services company

Ichibanya Co., Ltd. 株式会社壱番屋

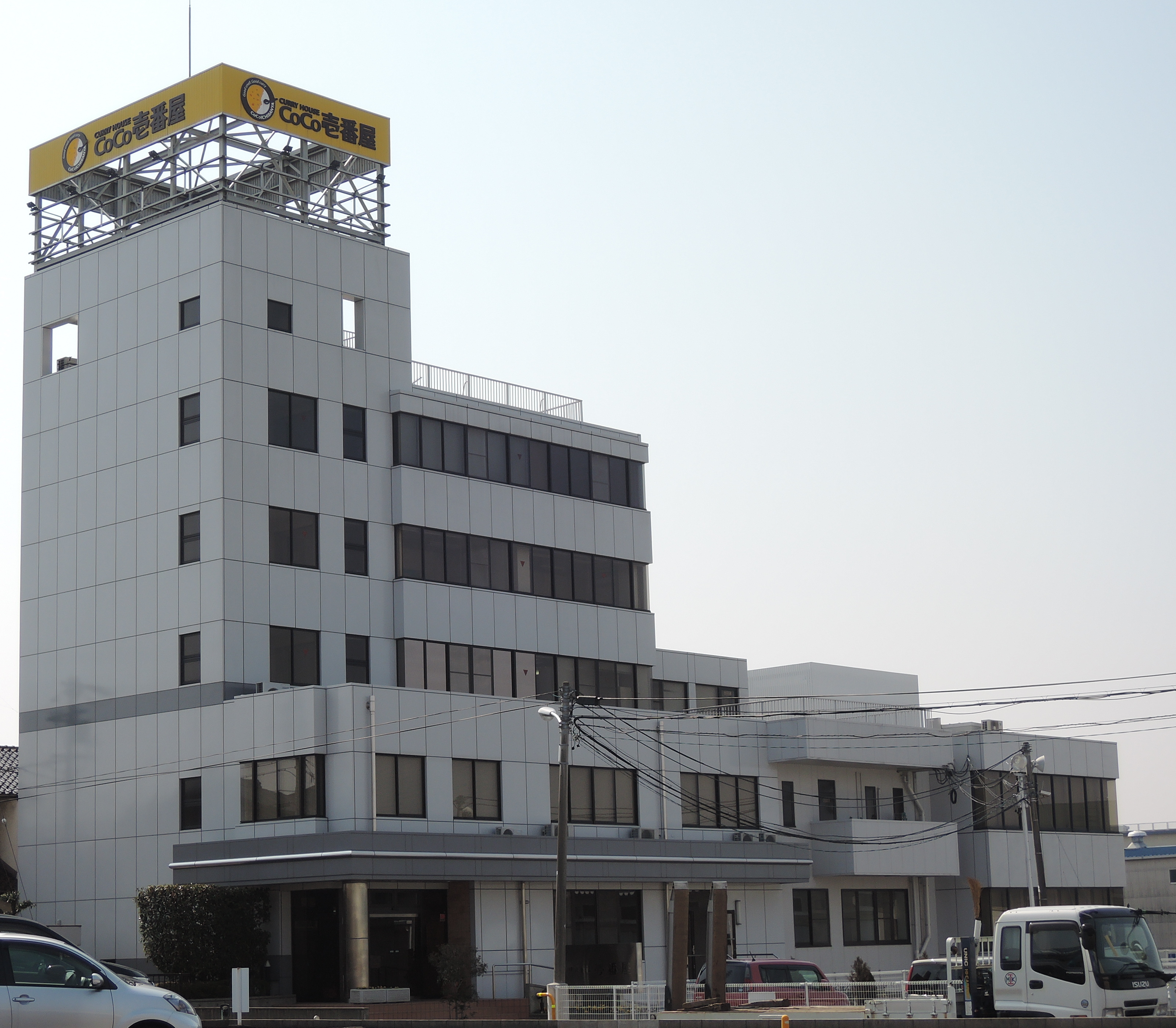
- Headquarters
- Type: Public
- Traded as: TYO: 7630
- Industry: Foodservice
- Founded: January 1978; 48 years ago
- Headquarters: Ichinomiya, Aichi, Japan
- Number of locations: 1,476 (January 2019)
- Area served: Japan; United States; China; Taiwan; South Korea; Thailand; Malaysia; Hong Kong; Singapore; Philippines; Indonesia; India; Vietnam; United Kingdom
- Key people: Toshiya Hamajima, president and representative director
- Products: Curry rice Ankake Spaghetti
- Revenue: ▲¥48.29 billion (2023)
- Operating income: ▲¥3.61 billion (2023)
- Net income: ▼¥2.54 billion (2023)
- Total assets: ▼¥42.43 billion (2023)
- Number of employees: 775
- Website: www.ichibanya.co.jp/english/index.html www.ichibanyausa.com ichibanyaindia.com ichibanya.uk www.ichibanya.com.cn

Ichibanya Co., Ltd. (株式会社壱番屋, Kabushiki gaisha Ichiban'ya) is a Japanese food services company based in Ichinomiya, Aichi.

== CoCo ICHIBANYA chain ==
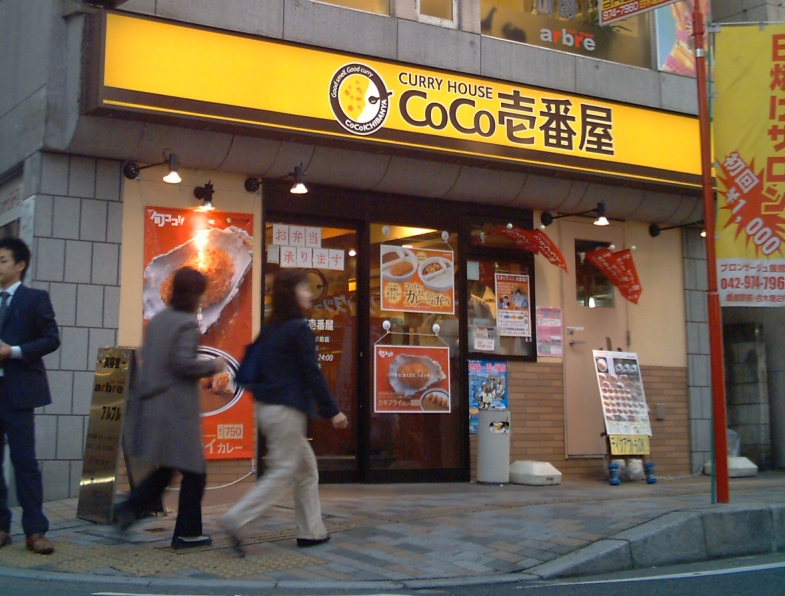
CoCo Ichibanya Curry House restaurant

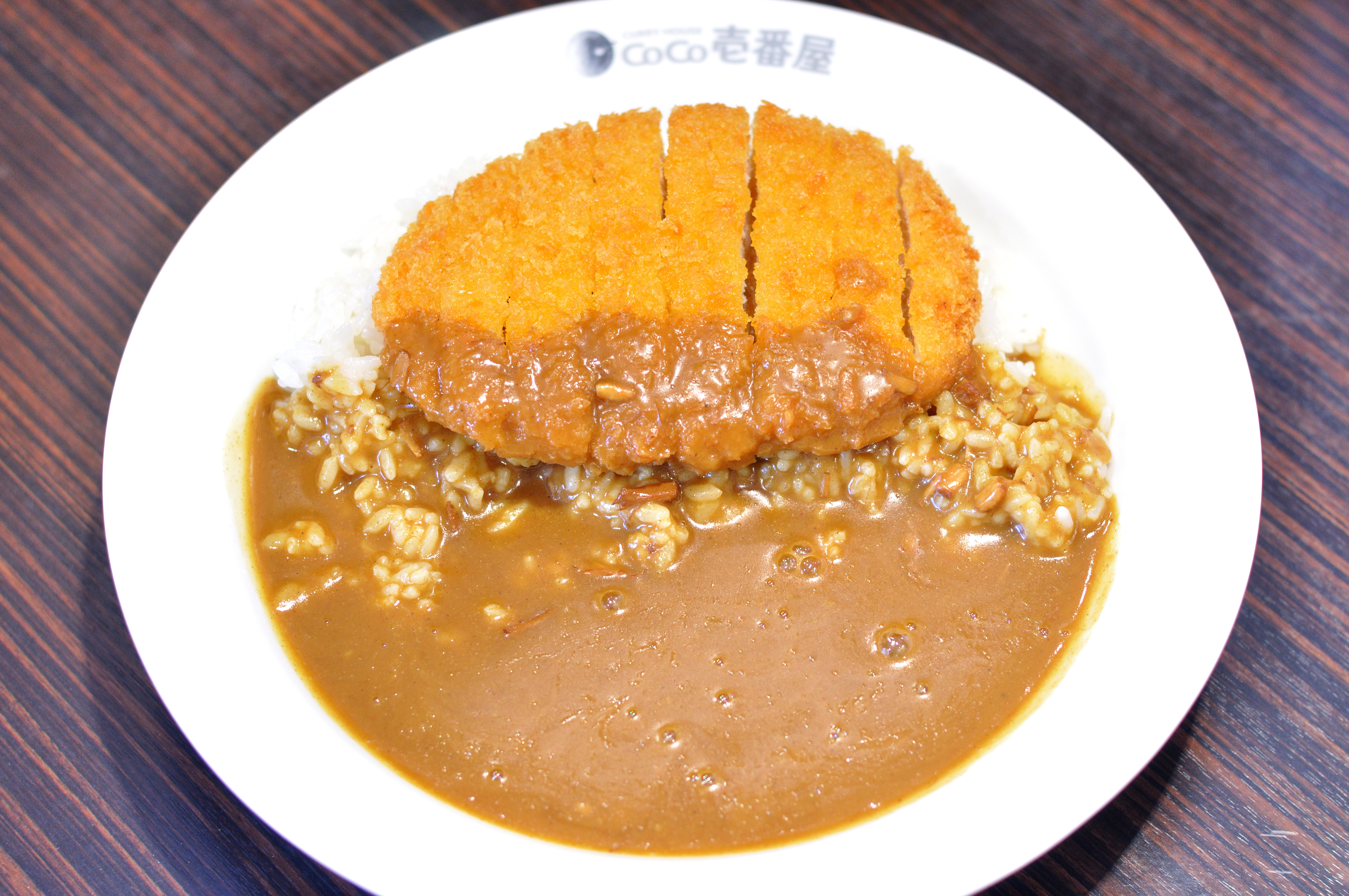
Katsu curry

ICHIBANYA Co., Ltd. owns the top curry rice restaurant chain in Japan, Curry House CoCo ICHIBANYA or usually just CoCo ICHIBAN or CoCo ICHI. The chain owns both direct and franchise restaurants in a total of thirteen countries: United States, Thailand, Indonesia, Singapore, China, Taiwan, Hong Kong, South Korea, Vietnam, the United Kingdom, the Philippines, Japan and India. The chain used to have an outlet in Malaysia, however, due to lack of popularity and poor business, Ichibanya recently shut down the outlet. The Curry House chain is by far the company's largest business.

- Japan: 1,304 branches

Current International Locations (Total: 181)

- China: 46
- Taiwan: 24
- Hong Kong: 9
- South Korea: 36
- Thailand: 27
- Philippines: 12
- United States (Hawaii, Guam, California, Texas): 11
- Indonesia: 10
- Singapore: 4
- Vietnam: 2
- United Kingdom: 2
- India: 2

Future International Location (Total: 1)

- Australia (Melbourne): 1

Former International Location (Total: 1)

- Malaysia: 1

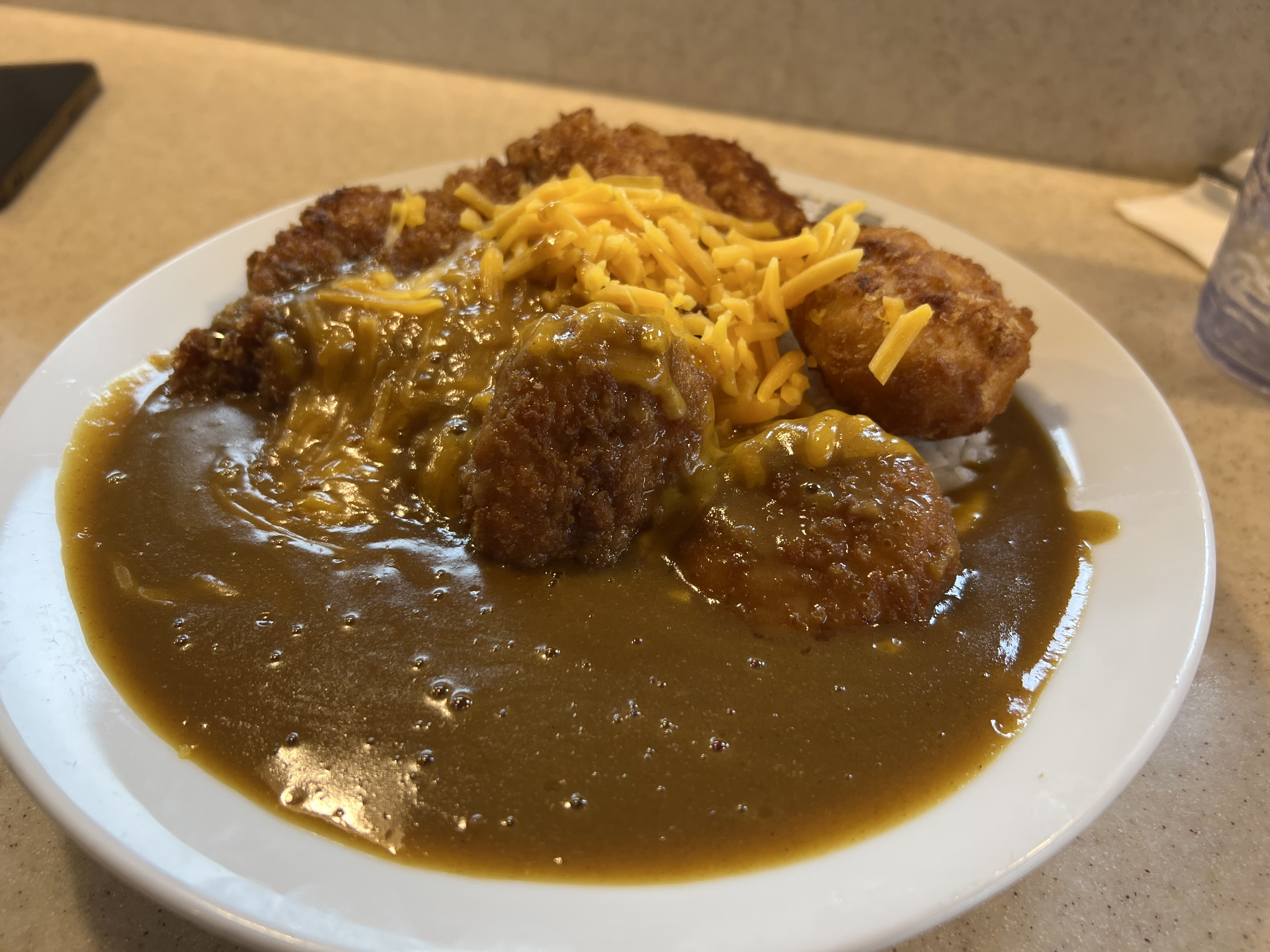
Curry from a Hawaii location

=== Halal and vegetarian ===
The company has a vegetarian menu consisting of plant-based curry, and two outlets offering halal options in Akihabara and Shinjuku.

== Pasta de Coco ==
The company also operates 25 restaurants in Japan under the name Pasta de Coco. It sells a pasta dish which is a kind of spaghetti with starchy sauce known as Ankake spaghetti (あんかけスパゲッティ, ankake supagetti). This dish is one of the distinctive foods of the Nagoya metropolitan area.
