= S&B Foods =

Japanese food company known for tube wasabi and curry cubes

- Type: Company
- Industry: Foodstuffs, spices and condiments, instant curries, and the manufacture and sale of cooked food
- Founded: April 5, 1940; 86 years ago
- Headquarters: Japan
- Key people: Hiroyuki Ogata (Chairman); Kazuya Ikemura (President)
- Products: Tube wasabi
- Website: Corporate website (in English)

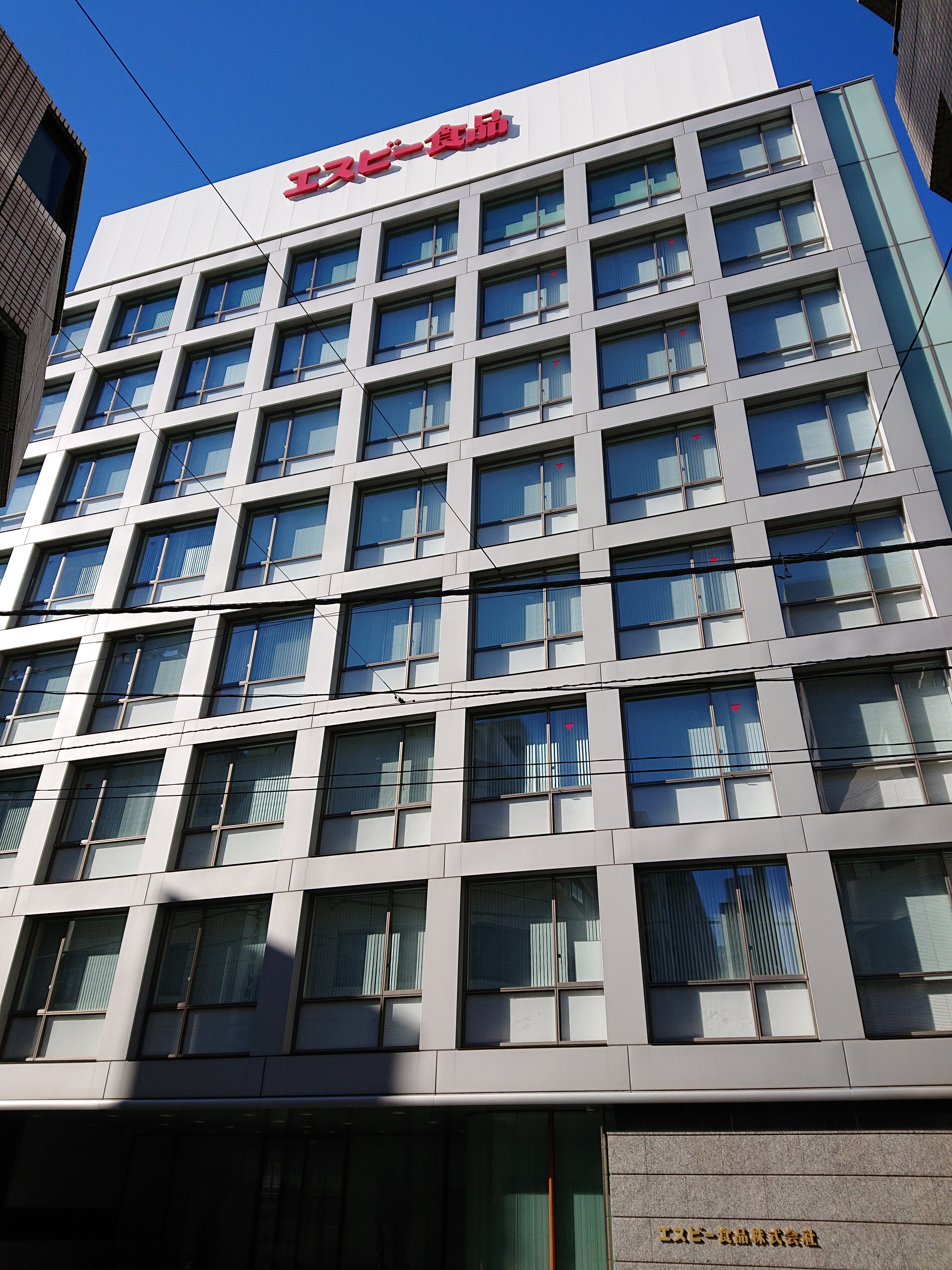

S&B Foods Inc. (エスビー食品株式会社, Esubī shokuhin kabushiki gaisha; TYO: 2805) is a Japanese company which manufactures, processes and distributes foodstuffs, spices and condiments, instant curries, and also makes and sells cooked food. Their logo shows the S being the start of the word "Spice" and the B coming from the end of "Herb".

The company invented tube wasabi and is well known for their Golden Curry Japanese curry cubes.
