= Retort pouch =

Type of food packaging

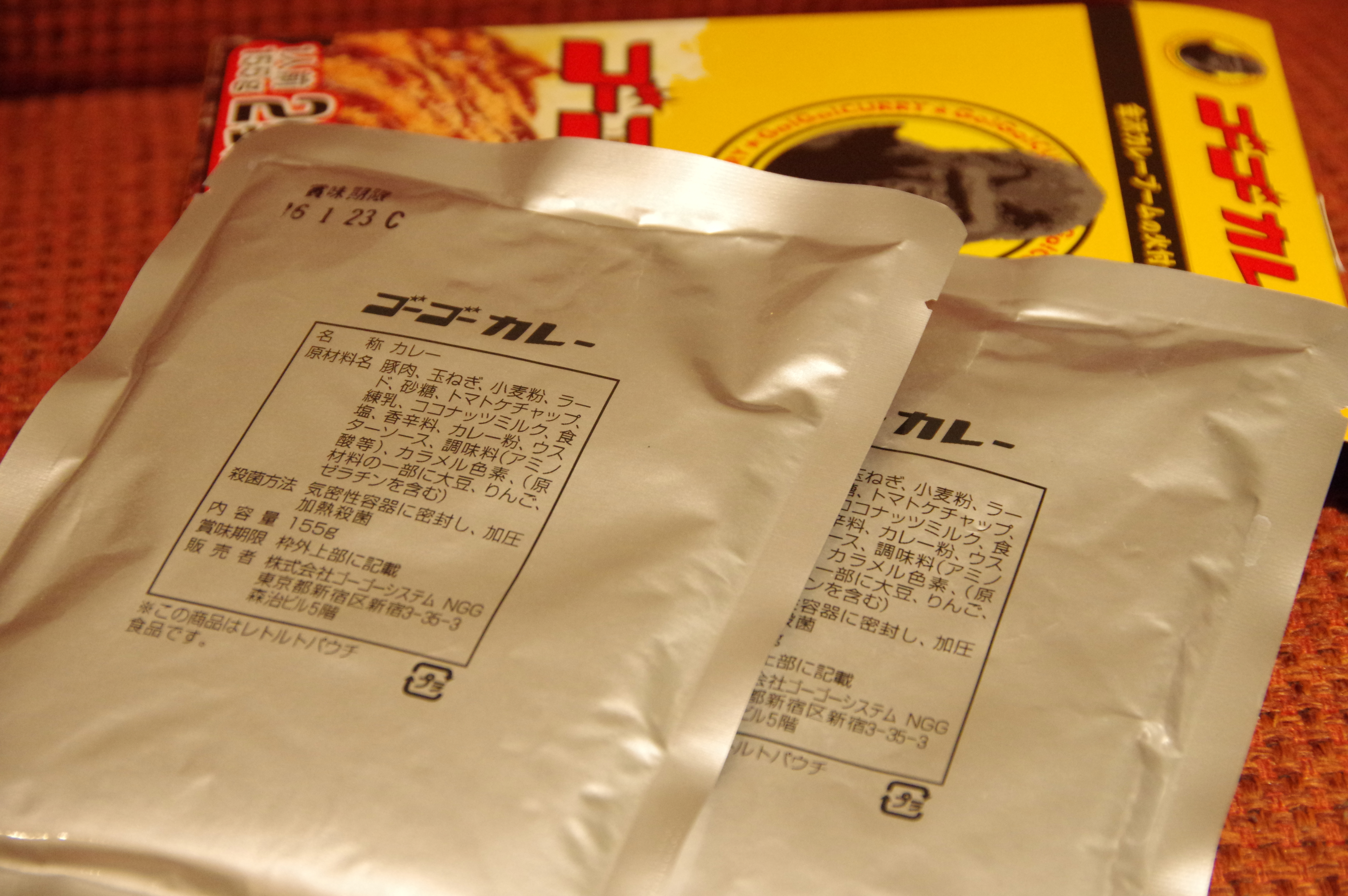
Two retort pouches

A retort pouch or retortable pouch is a type of food packaging made from a laminate of flexible plastic and metal foils. It allows the sterile packaging of a wide variety of food and drink handled by aseptic processing and is used as an alternative to traditional industrial canning methods. Retort pouches are used in baby and toddler food, camping food, field rations, fish products, instant noodles, space food, sports nutrition, and brands such as Capri-Sun and Tasty Bite.

Some varieties have a bottom gusset and are known as stand-up pouches.

== History ==
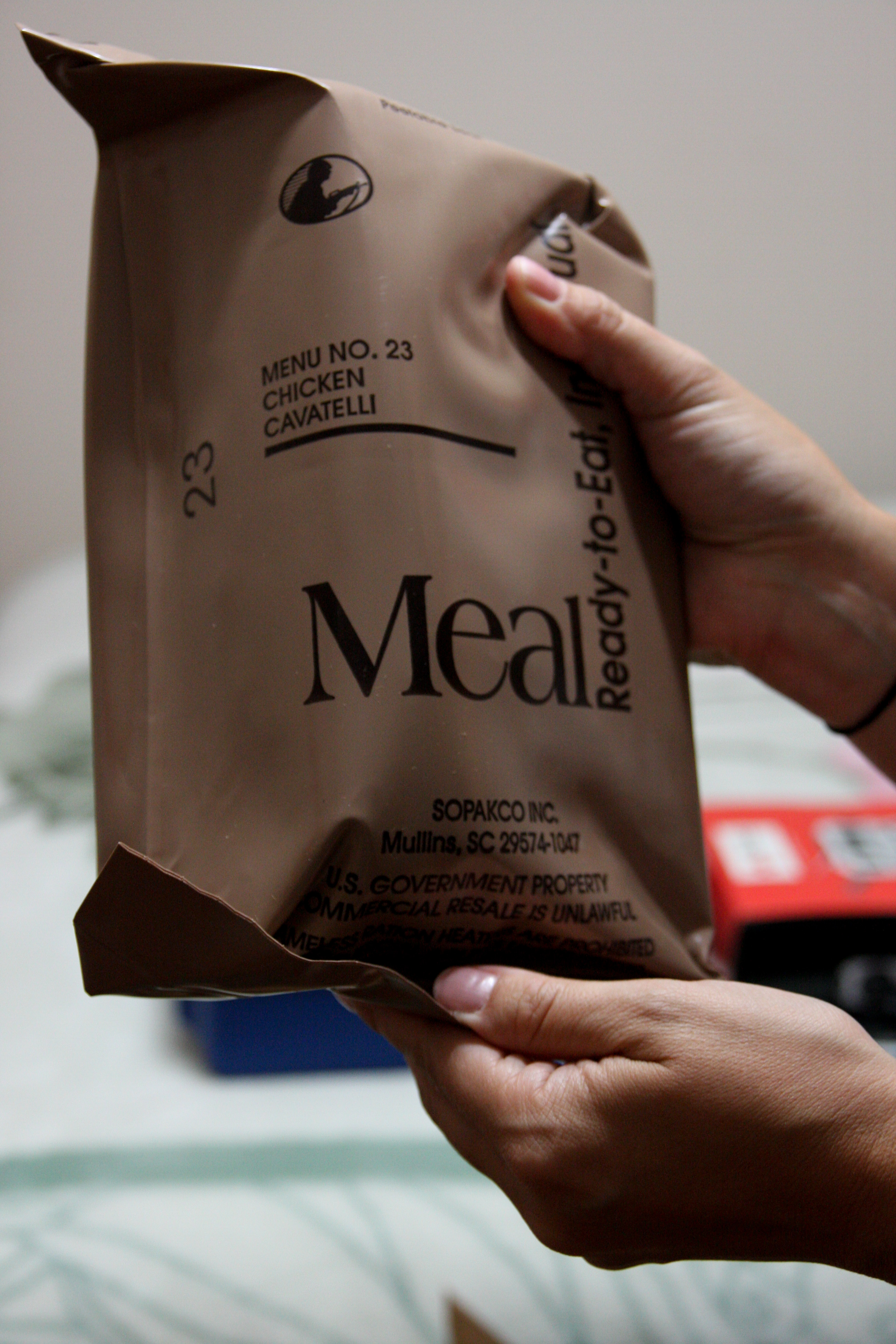
A Meal, Ready-to-Eat (MRE), a field ration that contains one or more retort pouches inside

In 1968 Otsuka Foods Company of Japan became the first company in the world to commercialize a retort food product. The product was a Japanese curry called "Bon Curry". Curry became a food that could be stored for long periods of time and like instant noodles, could be eaten after being cooked for three minutes. Since detailed technical information on the retort pouch, which was a military technology, was not publicly available, Otsuka Foods Company developed it in cooperation with a Group company that developed intravenous drugs using high-temperature sterilization technology.

The current form of the retort pouch was invented by the United States Army Natick Soldier Research, Development and Engineering Center, Reynolds Metals Company, and Continental Flexible Packaging, who jointly received the Food Technology Industrial Achievement Award for its invention in 1978.

== Construction ==
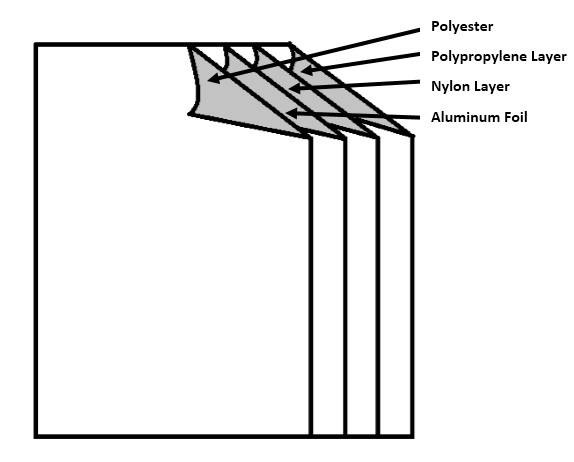
Typical layers of the material used to make retort pouches

A retort pouch is constructed from a flexible metal-plastic laminate that is able to withstand the thermal processing used for sterilization. The food is first prepared, either raw or cooked, and then sealed into the retort pouch. The pouch is then heated to 240–250 °F (116–121 °C) for several minutes under high pressure inside a retort or autoclave machine. The food inside is cooked in a similar way to pressure cooking. This process reliably kills all commonly occurring microorganisms (particularly Clostridium botulinum), preventing it from spoiling. The packaging process is very similar to canning, except that the package itself is flexible. The lamination structure does not allow permeation of gases from outside into the pouch. The retort pouch construction varies from one application to another, as a liquid product needs different barrier properties than a dry product, and similarly an acidic product needs different chemical resistance than a basic product. Some different layers used in retort pouches include:

- polyester (PET) – provides a gloss and rigid layer, may be printed inside
- nylon (bi-oriented polyamide) – provides puncture resistance
- aluminum (Al) – provides a very thin but effective gas barrier
- food-grade cast polypropylene (CPP) – used as the sealing layer
- polyethylene (PE) – can be used instead of PP as a sealing and bonding layer

This multi-layer structure prevents the retort pouch from being recycled into other retort pouches or food packaging. However, the material can be recycled into an aluminized resin or up-cycled into textile materials. The weight of a pouch is less than regular cans or bottles, and the energy required to produce each pouch is less than competing packaging from metals, paper, and glass.

== Reception ==
In the consumer market, retort pouches have gained great popularity outside of the United States, particularly in the Pacific Rim region. However, American consumers have demonstrated reluctance regarding the packaging technology and adoption has been slow. As a result, many retort packages sold in the United States are packaged in cartons to give them an appearance more familiar to consumers. Tasty Bite products are an example of a retort pouch product packaged in a carton. Several American food distributors have begun manufacturing foods in retort pouches without cartons, notably tuna canning companies as Chicken of the Sea and Bumble Bee and baby/toddler food companies as Plum Organics.

== See also ==
- Retort
- Shelf-stable food
- Environmental impacts of sterile food packaging
