= Japanese curry =

Japanese-style curry dish

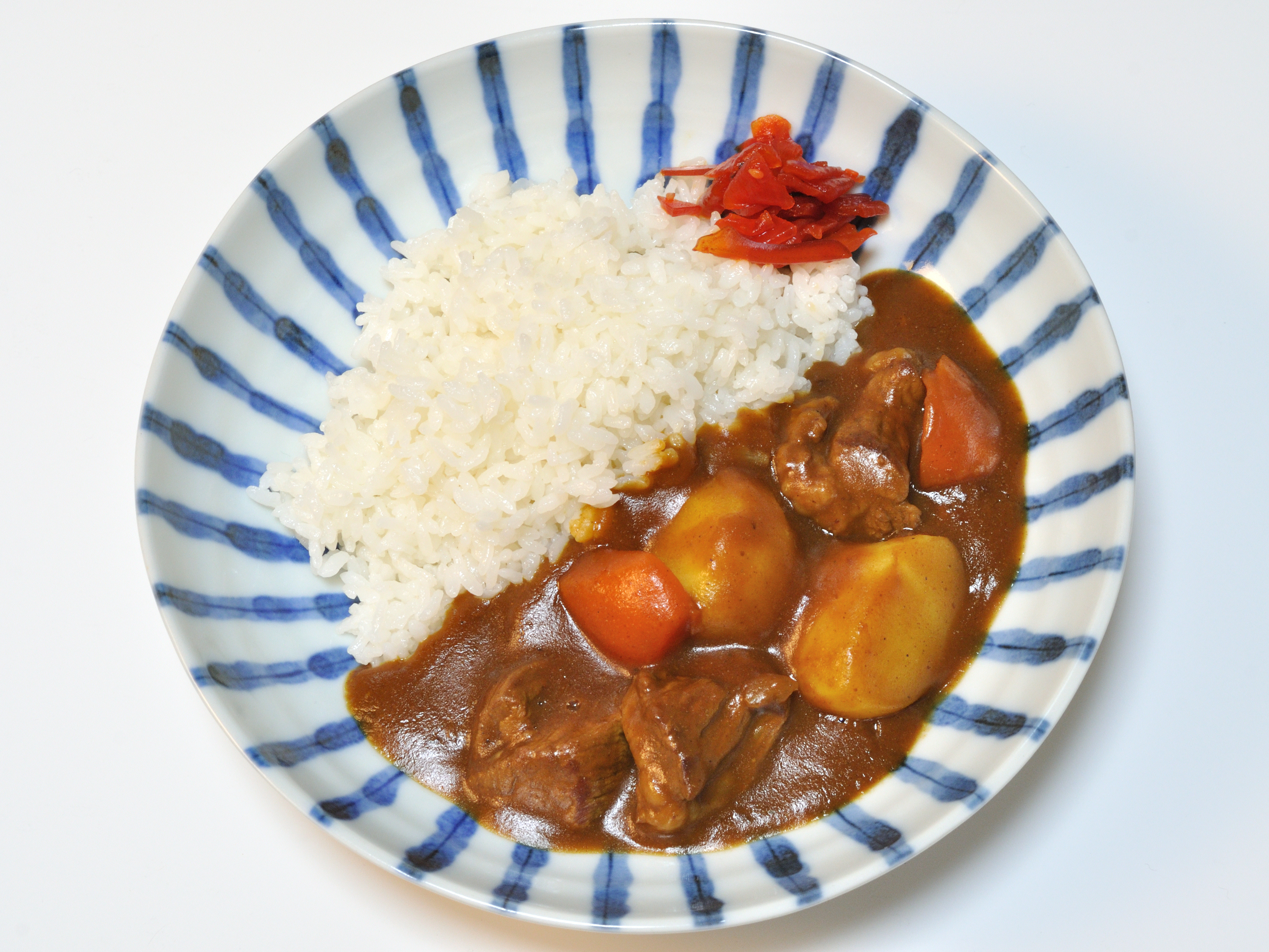
- A plate of Japanese-style curry with rice
- Type: Curry
- Place of origin: Japan
- Serving temperature: Hot
- Main ingredients: Vegetables (onions, carrots, potatoes), meat (beef, pork, chicken)
- Variations: Karē raisu, karē udon, karē-pan

Japanese curry (カレー, karē) is commonly served in three main forms: curry rice (カレーライス, karē raisu) (curry over white rice), curry udon (カレーうどん, karē udon) (curry over thick noodles), and curry bread (カレーパン, karē pan) (a curry-filled pastry). It is one of the most popular dishes in Japan. The very common curry rice dish is most often referred to simply as curry (カレー, karē).

Along with the sauce, a wide variety of vegetables and meats are used to make Japanese curry. The basic vegetables are onions, carrots, and potatoes. Beef, pork, and chicken are the most popular meat choices. Katsu curry is a breaded deep-fried cutlet (tonkatsu; usually pork; if chicken is used, it is called "chicken katsu curry") with Japanese curry sauce.

Curry originates in Indian cuisine and was introduced to Japan by the British. It was progressively reinvented to suit Japanese tastes and ingredients. Japanese curry has little resemblance to curries from other regions, and stands on its own as uniquely Japanese. The combination of sweet, sticky Japanese short-grain rice with a thickened curry sauce has led to the unique evolution of Japanese curry. The dish became popular and available for purchase at supermarkets and restaurants in the late 1960s. It is so widely consumed that it can be called a national dish.

== History ==
=== Early Japanese curry ===
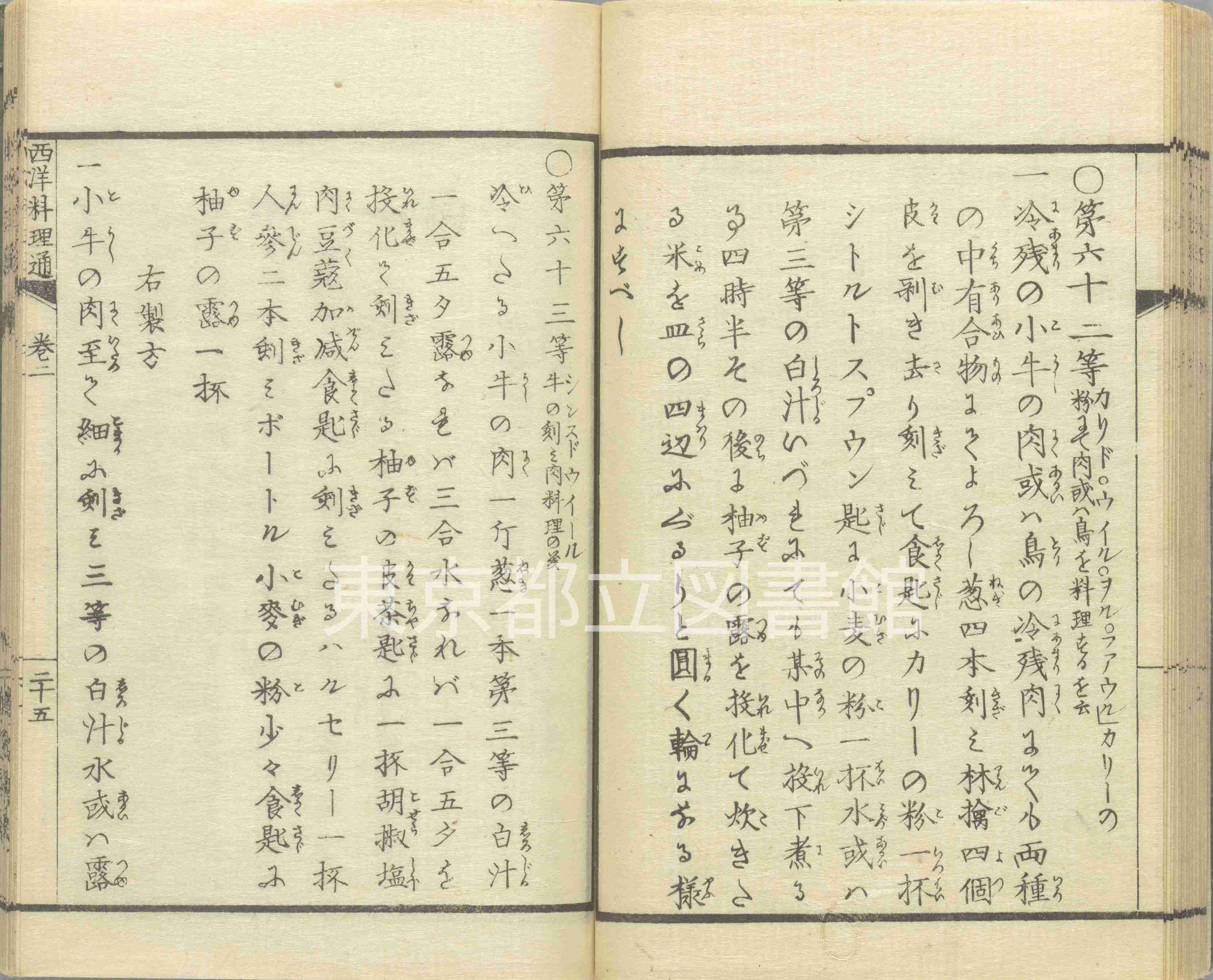
First known curry rice recipe of Japan, by Kanagaki Robun, 1872

Curry first appeared in Japanese cookbooks in 1872 during Japan's Meiji period, most likely having been introduced by the British Royal Navy with the spice mix called curry powder. At the time, the Indian subcontinent was under British colonial rule. The Imperial Japanese Navy then adapted the dish, substituting bread with rice and thickening the curry with flour to prevent spoiling while at sea. It was classified as yōshoku (Western style food) since it came from the West. By 1877, curry appeared on the menu of Seiyoken, a Tokyo restaurant.

Curry is commonly eaten as a rice dish in Japan, karē raisu (curry rice). The oldest Japanese mention of a dish called raisu karī (literally 'rice curry') appeared in cookbooks from 1872, but the karī in the name changed to karē around the turn of the 20th century. It was also described in an 1872 report, according to which foreign experts ate curry at the Tokyo branch of the Hokkaidō prefectural government. The word was popularized by American professor William S. Clark who was employed at the Sapporo Agricultural College (now Hokkaido University) in 1877. However, in 1873, there was a dish called curry rice on the menu of the Imperial Japanese Army Military Academy, so the word did not originate from Clark.

During the Meiji era (1868–1912), curry was still perceived in the private sector as a luxury cuisine for the wealthy, available only in high-end yōshoku specialty restaurants. Since its introduction, it was reinvented with ingredients from Japanese cuisine to make it suitable for Japanese tastes.

=== The beginning of the popularization of curry and the emergence of derivative foods ===
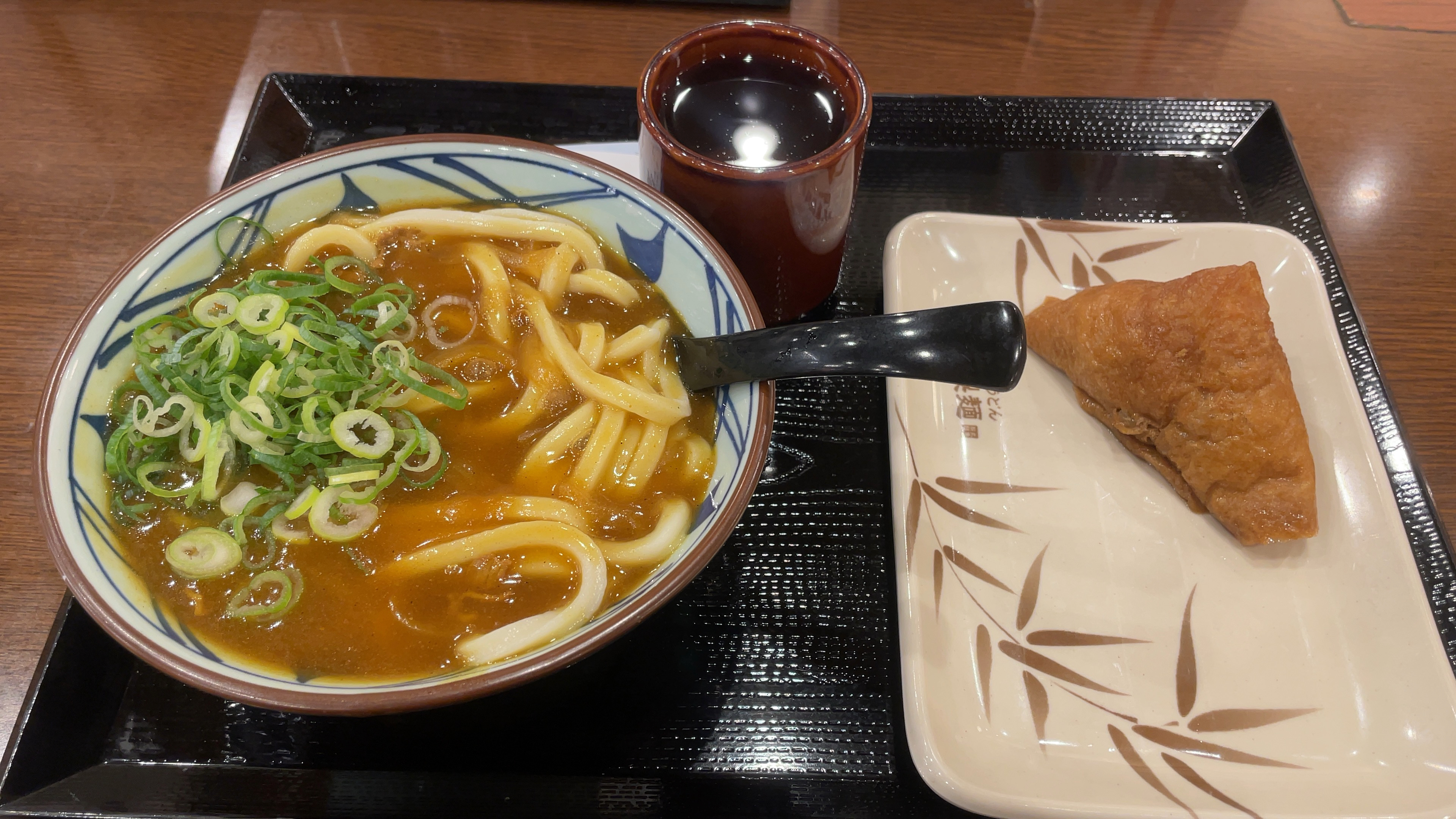
Curry udon and inari-zushi

In 1905, the dish became affordable for the general population with the introduction of domestically produced curry powder. In the 1920s, the predecessors of today's well-known S&B Foods and House Foods began selling curry powder.

In the early 1900s, restaurants created various derivatives of curry rice. The first curry udon and curry soba were made in Tokyo or Osaka in 1904 or 1909. Curry udon and curry soba are made by soaking katsuobushi (dried bonito flakes) in boiling water to dissolve the umami components, adding curry to the broth, and then adding potato starch to thicken the broth and pour it over the udon or soba.

The first curry bread (karē pan) was introduced in 1927, and the first katsu curry in 1918 or 1921 or 1948.

=== Popularization as home cooking ===
In 1945, Oriental Co Ltd developed a powdered instant curry roux, and in 1950, Bell Shokuhin Co Ltd developed a block-shaped instant curry roux, and Japanese curry quickly spread throughout Japan as a dish that could be easily prepared at home. In 1948, Japanese curry was used in school meals for the first time.

In 1963, House Foods introduced "Vermont Curry" (バーモントカレー), an instant curry roux made with apples and honey, which exploded in popularity. This product brought a mild sweetness to Japanese curry, which had been perceived as a spicy, adult dish, and made Japanese curry one of children's favorite dishes.

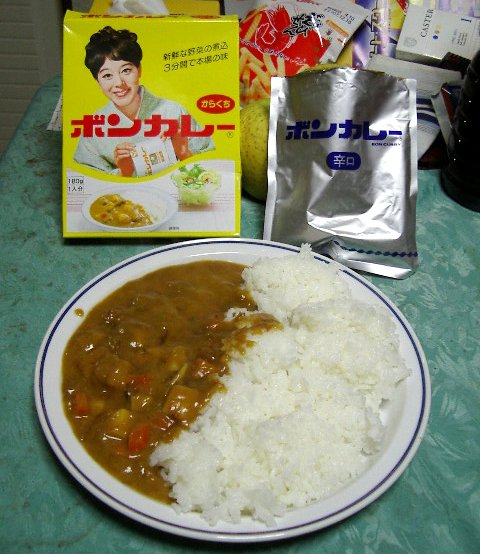
"Bon Curry", the world's first commercial retort pouch food. The Bon Curry packaging box design in the photo is a reprint.

In 1968 (or 1969), Otsuka Foods Company became the first company in the world to commercialize a retort pouch food product. The product was a Japanese curry called "Bon Curry" (ボンカレー). Curry became a food that could be stored for long periods of time and, like instant noodles, could be eaten in three minutes with boiling water. Since detailed technical information on the retort pouch, which was a military technology, was not publicly available, Otsuka Foods Company developed it in cooperation with a Group company that developed intravenous drugs using high-temperature sterilization technology.

Today, curry is one of the most popular daily dishes in Japan. In 2013, production totaled 7,570 tons of curry powder and 91,105 tons of ready-made sauces; sales in 2008 amounted to 7 billion yen for curry powder and 86 billion yen for ready-made sauces. By 2000, curry was a more frequent meal than sushi or tempura.

Curry similar to that served in the Indian subcontinent is known as Nakamura-ya curry. It was introduced to Japan by Rash Behari Bose (1886–1945) when he began to sell curry at Nakamura-ya, a bakery in Tokyo.

== Sauce mixes ==
Curry sauce (カレーソース, karē sōsu) is served on top of cooked rice to make curry rice. Curry sauce is made by frying together curry powder, flour, and oil, along with other ingredients, to make roux; the roux is then added to stewed meat and vegetables, and then simmered until thickened. Pressure cooking can be used as well. Adding potatoes to curry sauce was introduced by William S. Clark due to rice shortages at the time.

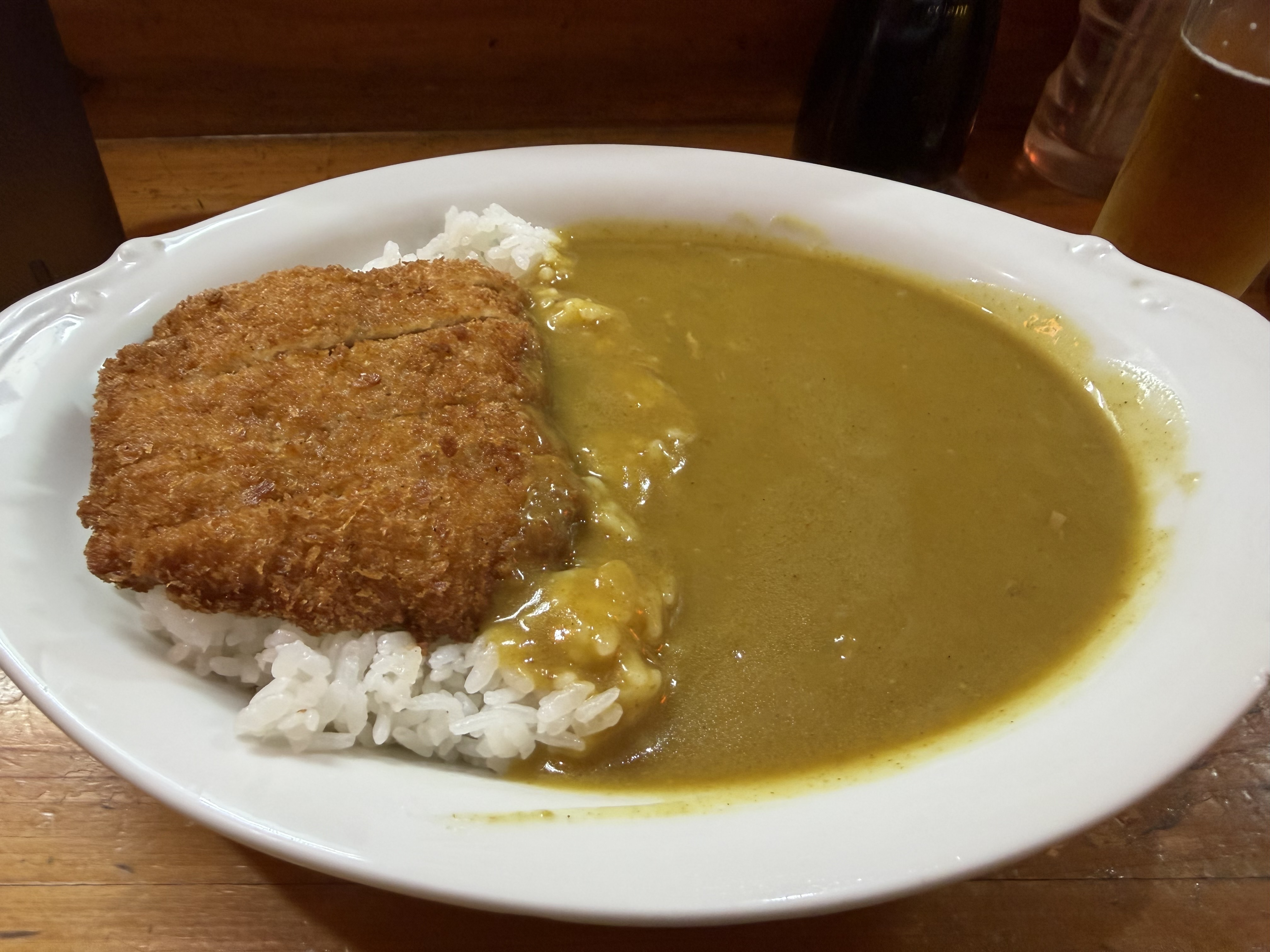
A plate of Japanese katsu curry in Osaka, Japan

In Japanese homes, curry sauce is most commonly made from instant curry roux, which is available in block and powder forms. These contain curry powder, flour, oils, and various flavorings. Ease of preparation, variety, and availability of instant curry mixes made curry rice very popular, as it is very easy to make compared to many other Japanese dishes. Pre-made curry is available in retort pouches that can be reheated in boiling water. For those who make curry roux from scratch, there are also curry powders specially formulated to create the "Japanese curry" taste.

Instant curry roux was first sold in powder form in 1945 and in block form in 1950. In 2007, Japanese domestic shipments of instant curry roux was 82.7 billion yen. Market share for household use in 2007 was captured almost entirely by House Foods (59.0%), S&B Foods (25.8%) and Ezaki Glico (9.4%). Curry is marketed to children utilizing characters from video games and anime.

Retort pouch curry sauce, prepared by heating the retort pouch in hot water or the microwave, is also popular. As of 2007, curry sauce is the largest single category of vacuum-sealed foods in Japan, making up over 30% of sales.

== Serving ==
Japanese curry rice is served in anything from a flat plate to a soup bowl. The curry is poured over rice in any manner and amount. Japanese short-grain rice, which is sticky and round, is preferred, rather than the medium-grain variety used in Indian dishes. It is usually eaten with a spoon, as opposed to chopsticks, because of the liquid nature of the curry. Curry rice is usually served with fukujinzuke or rakkyō on the side.

== Local curry styles ==
In the late 1990s, a number of regional specialty curries emerged, popularised as vacuum-sealed curry sauces. Varieties include Yokosuka navy curry (よこすか海軍カレー, Yokosuka kaigun karē), sold in Yokosuka to promote its heritage as a naval base, and Zeppelin Curry (ツェッペリンカレー, Tsepperin Karē) in Tsuchiura to promote the Zeppelin landing in 1929.

== Navy curry ==
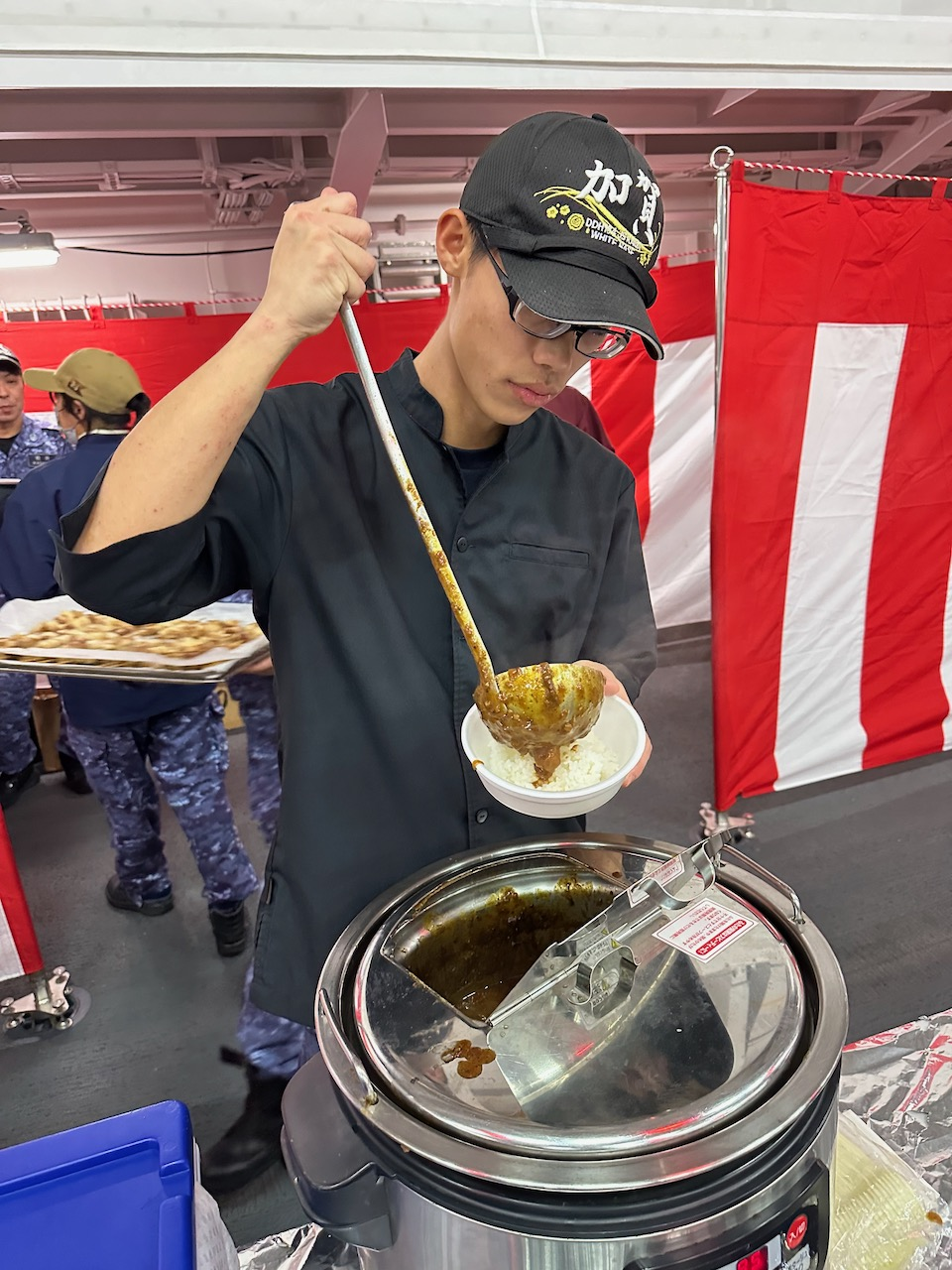
A sailor from JS Kaga serves their signature curry during an event aboard.

Navy curry (海軍カレー, kaigun karē) refers to the curry developed by the Imperial Japanese Navy (IJN), and continued today by the Japan Maritime Self-Defense Force (JMSDF). It is also called Yokosuka Curry due to the Navy's long association with Yokosuka, and Kaiho Curry (海保カレー) when made by the Japan Coast Guard (JCG).

It is hypothesized that curry became popular in Japan because the British Royal Navy, which the IJN was modeled after, served it aboard their own ships, or because it was on the menu of the Imperial Japanese Army's mess hall. On the other hand, Naoshi Takamori, a naval culinary researcher and former JMSDF officer, points out that although Japanese military manuals from the 1880s include instructions for making curry, curry did not become common in the Imperial Japanese Navy until the 1920s, during the Showa era. According to him, curry did not spread from the Japanese military to the Japanese civilian sector, but was adopted by the Japanese military from the civilian sector.

Regardless of who introduced it first, curry was a quick and easy source of thiamine (vitamin B1), needed to prevent the malnutrition condition beriberi. Beriberi is a condition prevalent on long sea voyages where Japanese sailors subsisted on white rice and access to fresh vegetables can be difficult, and curry became a weekly staple aboard IJN ships to combat its effects.

Curry is also easy to make in large quantities, and its popularity in Japan prompted JMSDF and JCG to continue the IJN tradition of making curry for its sailors every Friday, with every ship's galley unofficially competing against each other to see who can develop the best recipe.

A Navy curry of beef or chicken meat, potatoes, onions, carrots, curry roux, rice, and a chutney of pickled vegetables (fukujinzuke) is described in the 1888 cookbook Kaigun kappōjitsu (海軍割烹術, 'Navy Cooking Methods')., while a recipe credited to the now decommissioned Yaeyama-class minesweeper JS Hachijō (MSO-303), was featured in Tadashi Ono and Harris Salat's 2013 book, Japanese Soul Cooking, and continues to be quoted by other chefs as a favorite curry today.

The cities of Yokosuka and Kure host annual "Curry Festivals" inviting various ships in port and local restaurants to showcase their recipes for Navy Curry, and even the US Navy Base mess at Fleet Activities Yokosuka has created and sells its own version of Navy Curry.

== Spice curry ==
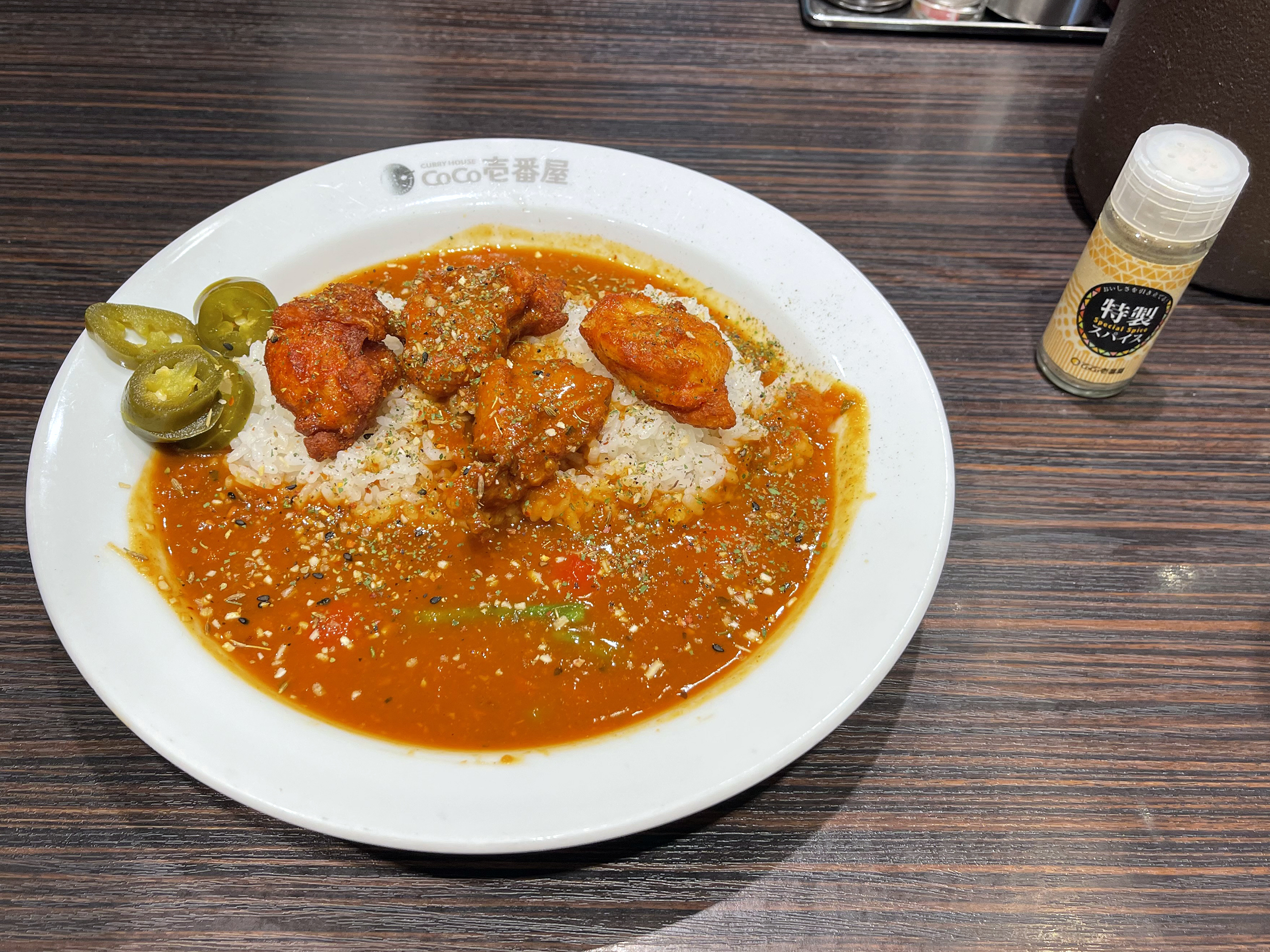
CoCo Ichibanya's Chicken and Tomato Hot Spice Curry

Spice curry (スパイスカレー, Supaisu karē) is a Japanese curry dish that originated in Osaka in the 2000s.

Unlike traditional Japanese curry, it uses a wide variety of spices. Inspired by South Asian cuisine, it also incorporates Japanese elements such as dashi and often features side dishes served on the same plate. The dish gained widespread popularity around 2013. The popularity of spice curry has increased rapidly since 2016.

== Outside Japan ==
=== South Korea ===
Curry was introduced to South Korea during the period of Japanese rule, and is popular there. It is often found at bunsik restaurants (diner-style establishments), donkkaseu-oriented restaurants, and at the majority of Japanese restaurants. Premade curry and powdered mixes are also readily available at supermarkets.

=== North Korea ===
Japanese curry was introduced to North Korea by Zainichi Koreans who migrated from Japan during the 1960s–1970s repatriation project. Along with other Japanese cuisine, it was traded by new arrivals for local products and used to bribe Workers' Party cadres.

=== Elsewhere ===
Mixes can be found outside Japan and Korea in supermarkets that have a Japanese section or in Japanese or Asian food stores. Mixes are also available from retailers online.

The largest Japanese curry company in Japan is House Foods Corporation. The company operated more than 10 Curry House restaurants in the US until mid-2019 when it sold off its interest to CH Acquisitions LLC, which abruptly closed the restaurants in February 2020. House Foods associated company CoCo Ichibanya (Ichibanya Co., Ltd.) or Kokoichi has more than 1,200 restaurants in Japan. CoCo Ichibanya has branches in China, Hong Kong, Korea, Singapore, Taiwan, Indonesia, Philippines, Thailand, United Kingdom, United States (more specifically Hawaii and California), and India.

Due to the rapid rise in popularity of katsu curry in the United Kingdom, other varieties of Japanese curry and curry sauce are sometimes erroneously referred to as "katsu curry" and "katsu sauce", even in cases where the katsu (cutlet) itself is not included.

== See also ==
- Rice and curry
- Gyūdon
