= Tonjiru =

Japanese pork and miso soup

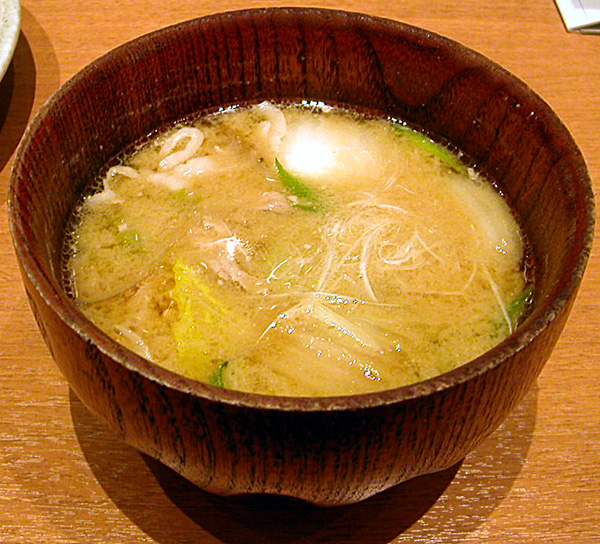
- Alternative names: Butajiru
- Type: Soup
- Place of origin: Japan
- Main ingredients: Pork, vegetables, miso

Tonjiru or butajiru (豚汁; "pork soup") is a Japanese soup made with pork and vegetables, flavoured with miso. It is a more substantial version of miso soup, with a larger quantity and variety of ingredients.

== Common ingredients ==
Tonjiru is usually made by stewing thinly sliced pieces of pork, alongside vegetables, in dashi stock, and flavoured by dissolving miso.

Common additional ingredients include burdock root, konjac, seaweed, spring onions, daikon radish, carrot, tofu including fried tofu (aburaage), tubers such as potatoes, taro or sweet potato, and mushrooms such as shiitake and shimeji.

On rare occasions, mildly degreased (not crispy) bacon can be used in place of pork. Instant butajiru is also available.

== Name ==
The Japanese kanji character for pig (豚) can be pronounced either as ton (the on'yomi way), or as buta (the kun'yomi way), resulting in two ways to say the name of the dish (豚汁), tonjiru and butajiru. While tonjiru is much more common and used by most people in Japan at around 70%, butajiru is dominant in Hokkaido and Kyushu, along with a majority in the Toyama and Mie prefectures, with a small minority in most of the remaining prefectures of Western Japan.

A version of the dish, containing sweet potatoes, as served to skiers in the ski resorts of Niigata Prefecture up until about 1960, is known as sukii-jiru ("skiing-soup").

== Gallery ==
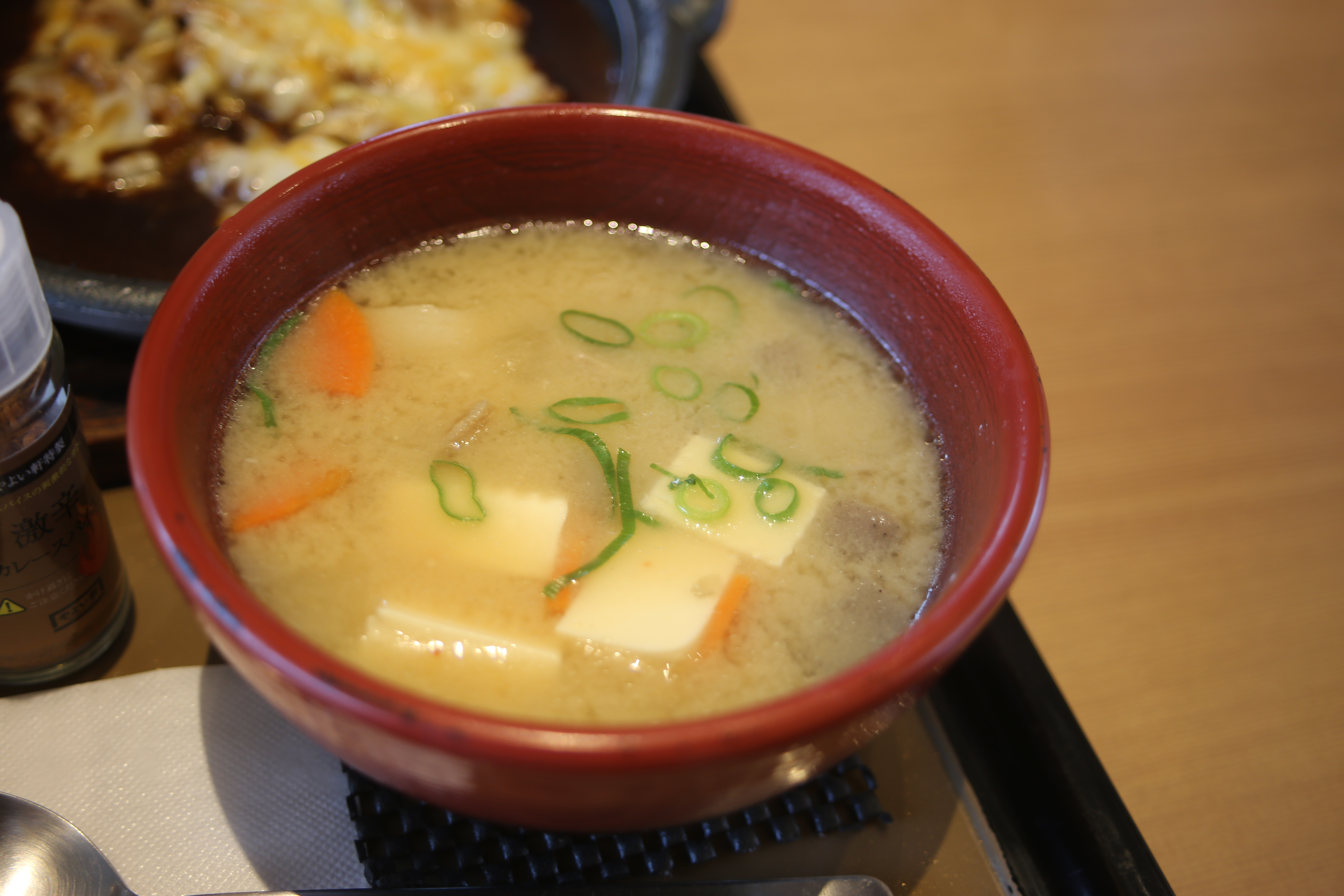
With tofu and negi

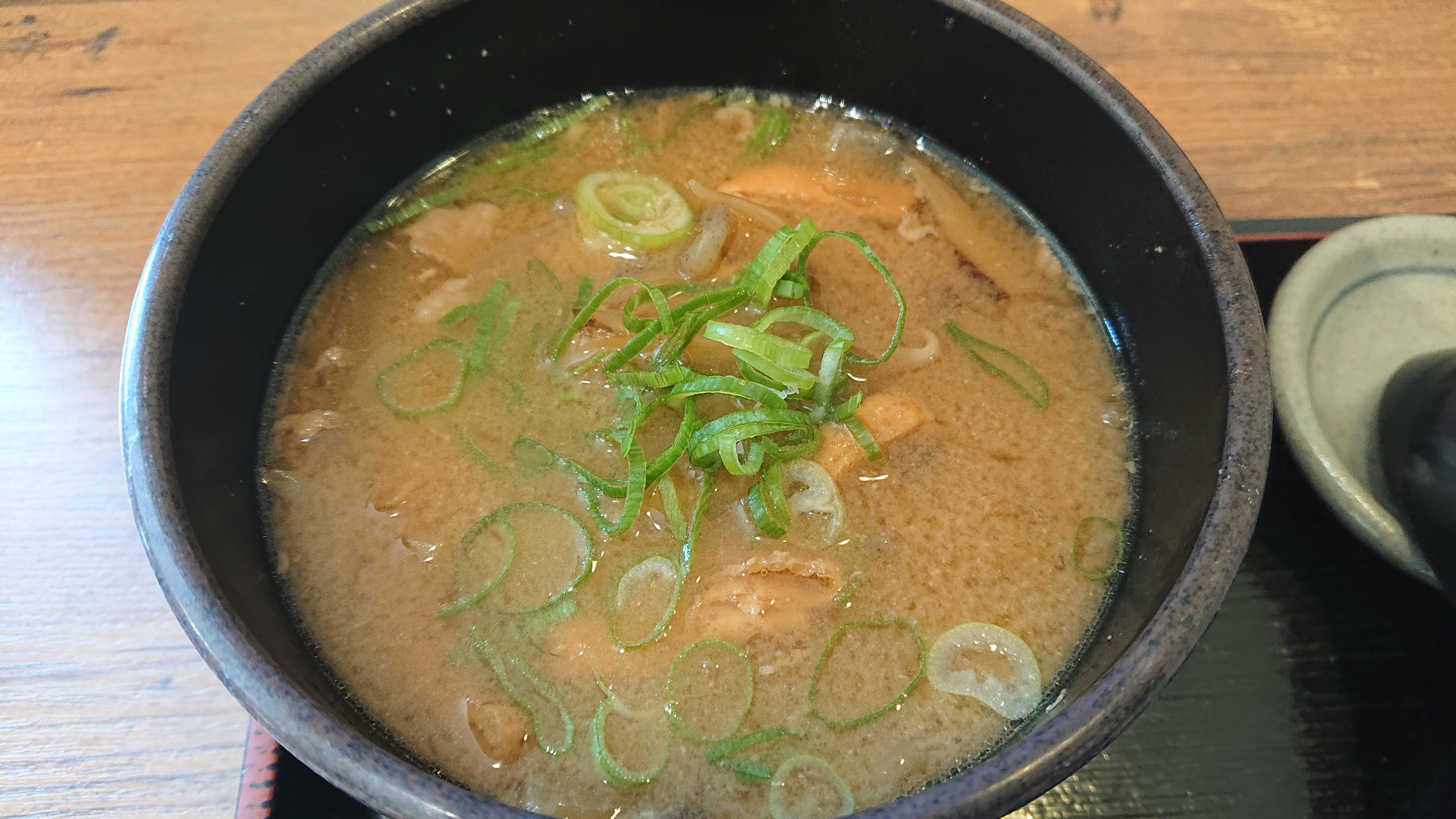
With abura-age and negi

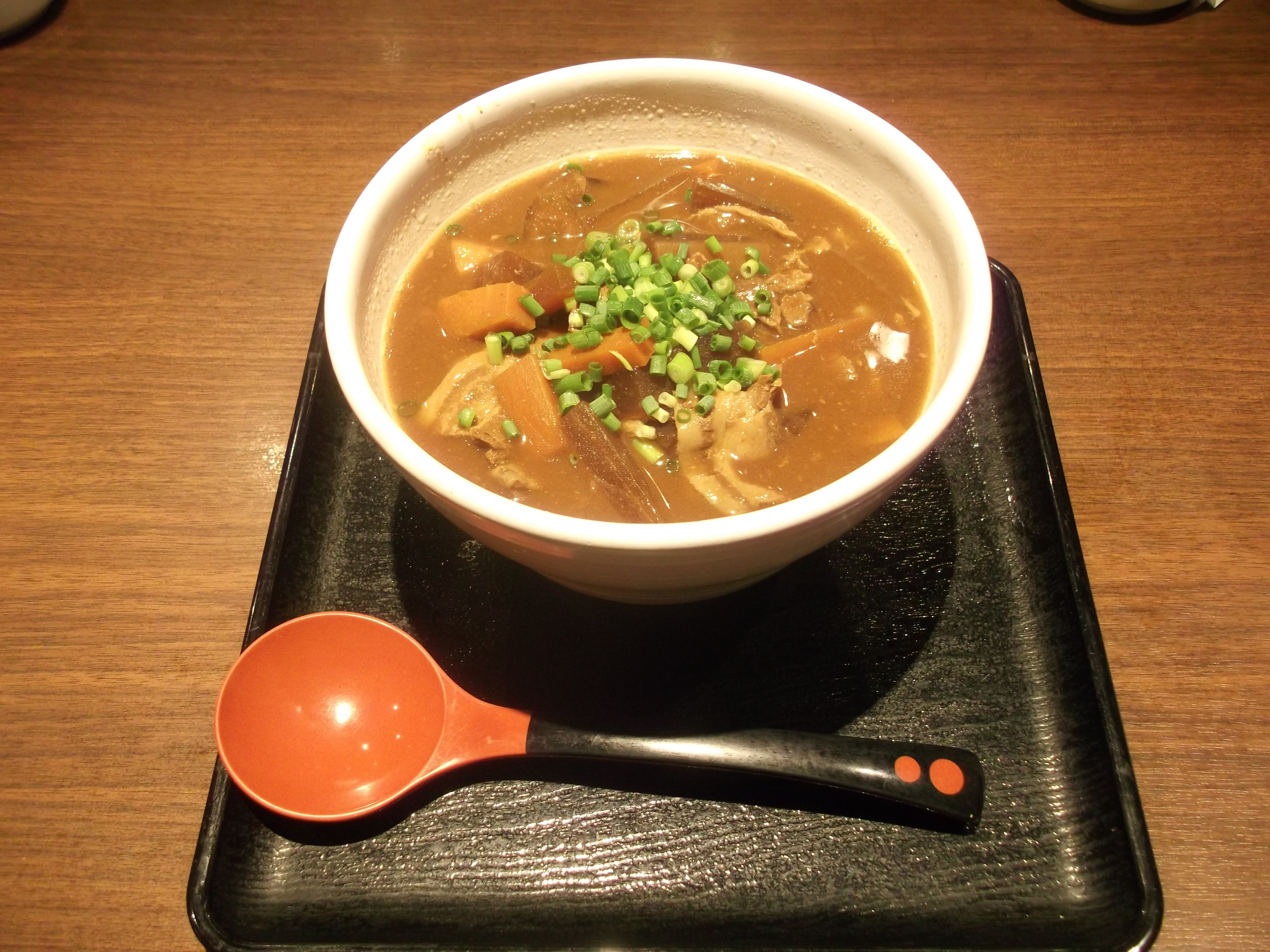
With udon noodles

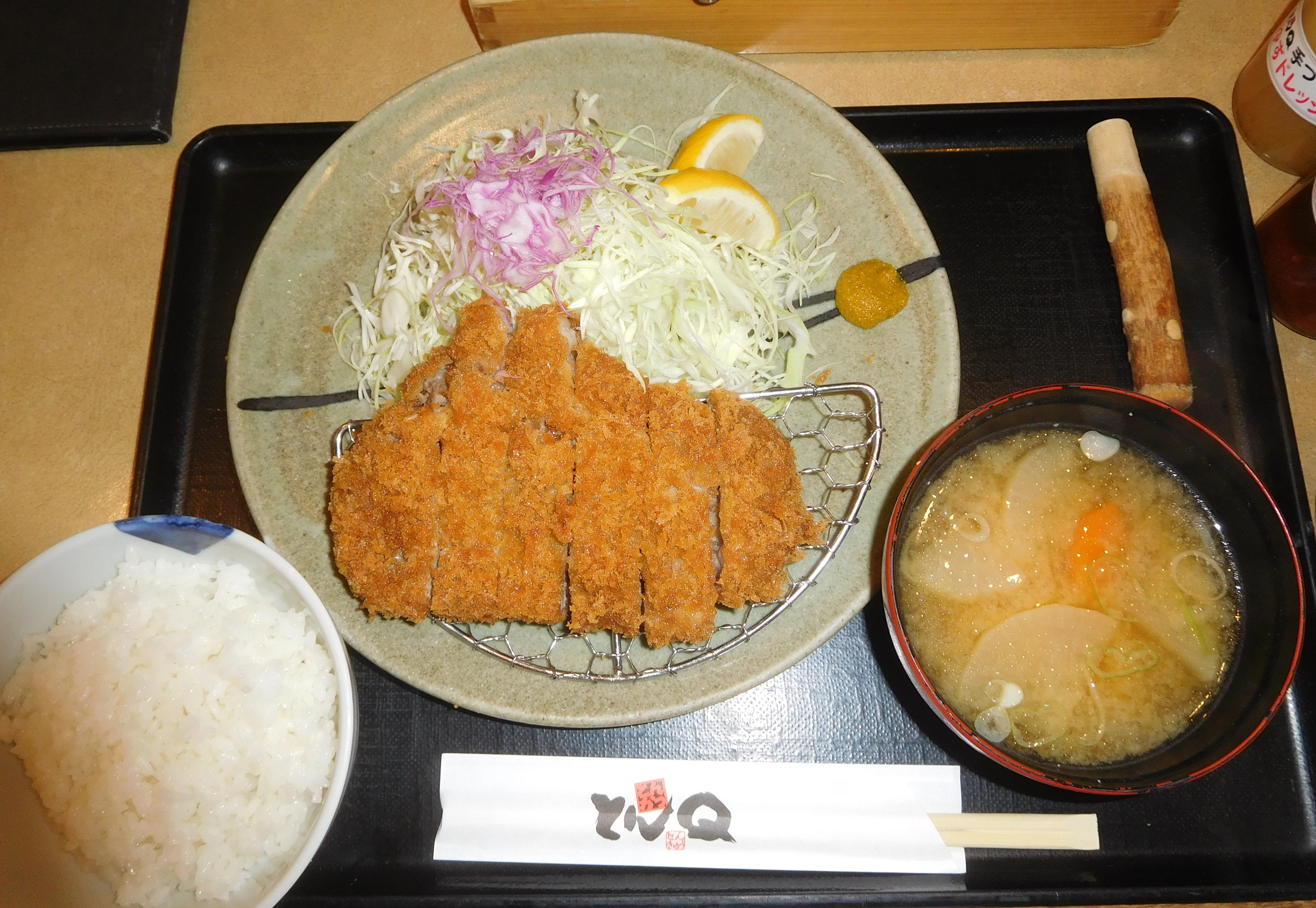
With fried tonkatsu cutlet
