= Orba (instrument) =

Crowdfunded electronic musical instrument manufactured by Artiphon

- Manufacturer: Artiphon

Technical specifications
- Timbrality: four parts
- Synthesis type: digital synthesis
- Velocity expression: yes

Input/output
- Keyboard: eight touchpads
- External control: MIDI

Orba is an electronic musical instrument developed by the American music technology company Artiphon. It is a small synthesiser released in 2020 via a successful Kickstarter campaign. Orba has been used as a tool for musical education in various capacities.

== Release ==
Following the success of their previous instrument, the Instrument 1, Artiphon once again used Kickstarter to launch Orba. From 25 November 2019 to 12 January 2020, Orba was the subject of a Kickstarter appeal. Pledges started at $79 with an overall goal of $50,000. The goal was surpassed, reaching almost $1.5 million. The instrument was later released in April 2020 for $99.

== Design ==
The Orba's design has drawn comparisons to various fruit: The Verge likened it to a grapefruit, while Engadget stated that it "looks like some piece of alien black citrus fruit". Artiphon has stated that this is meant to be the case as the instrument was inspired by "grapefruits and bowls of miso soup” as well as easy to pick up objects like a tennis ball.

The instrument is made of plastic and glass fibers. Orba uses eight touchpads (with LEDs) to control the device's sounds, with a central button being used for menu options. The touchpads and additional sensors allow gesture control over vibrato, slide and other sound parameters. The touchpads are quantised to either a major or minor scale covering one octave at a time. Four tracks (a nine part drum machine as well as bass, chord and lead tracks) are then used to construct a song using the instrument's looper. Orba contains a speaker and is powered by batteries.

While Orba can be used standalone, it can also be used with other hardware. In terms of external connection, the Orba has an app to facilitate changes of preset sounds and music sharing. The instrument can also be used as an MPE-capable MIDI controller. In 2022, Artiphone launched the free Orbasynth, a program allowing control over the Orba's internal sound engine. The editor features two waveshape-morphing oscillators, three ADSR envelopes, noise, ring modulator and a waveguide.

== Legacy ==
Orba has been used as a music education tool by multiple charities and childcare facilities, including the Notes for Notes non-profit, the Boyle Heights Arts Conservatory, the Anaheim Elementary School District and Vanderbilt Children’s Hospital.

At the 2022 NAMM Show, Artiphon announced a sequel to the Orba: the Orba 2. The Orba 2 expanded on the original, adding sampling and quanitsation functions. It also expanded on the loop length, increasing the limit to 128 bars.

== See also ==
- Chompi - also a crowdfunded musical instrument designed to be used for education
