= Orba =

Orba may refer to:

- Orba, Alicante, a town in eastern Spain
- Orba (river), a torrential stream in northern Italy
- Orba (Irish mythology), a High King of Ireland
- Orba (satellite), also known as X-2, was intended to be the first satellite launched by a British rocket
- The New Order regime of Indonesia, commonly known as Orba
- Orba (instrument), an electronic musical instrument

== See also ==
- Orbe (disambiguation)
