= Orbe (disambiguation) =

Orbe is a municipality in the Swiss canton of Vaud. Orbe may also refer to:

Places

- Orbe (river), river of the Rhine basin
- Orbe (Arrats), tributary of the Arrats river in Southern France
- Orbe District, district of the Swiss canton of Vaud
  - Orbe Castle, castle in the municipality of Orbe
  - Orbe Temple, alternative name of the Reformed Church of Notre-Dame, Orbe, in the municipality of Orbe

People

- Gabriel Ortiz de Orbé (1600–1661), Roman Catholic prelate
- Gonzalo Rubio Orbe (1909–1994), Ecuadorian anthropologist and historian
- José María de Orbe y Gaytán, 1st Viscount of Orbe (1848-1933), Spanish Carlist soldier and politician

Other

- Canal Orbe 21, television station in Buenos Aires, Argentina

== See also ==
- Orbe-Chavornay railway, in Vaud, Switzerland
- Liber de orbe, 1130s CE Latin translation of an 8th century Arabic cosmological work
- Andrés de Orbe y Larreategui (fl. 1730s–1740s), Grand Inquisitor of Spain
- Orb (disambiguation)
- Orba (disambiguation)
