= Orb =

Orb or ORB may refer to:

- Sphere
- Globus cruciger, ceremonial orb
  - Sovereign's Orb, a crown jewel of the United Kingdom
- Crystal ball

== Animals ==
- Orb web, a type of spider web
- Orb (horse), the winner of the 2013 Kentucky Derby

== Arts and entertainment ==
=== Literature ===
- Orb Kaftan, a character from the Incarnations of Immortality novel series by Piers Anthony
- Orb (comics), a Marvel Comics villain
- Orb Speculative Fiction, an Australian magazine by Orb Publications
- Orb: On the Movements of the Earth, a Japanese manga and anime series about the rise of heliocentrism

=== Music ===
- The Orb, a British electronic music group
- O.R.B. (band) (formerly The Original Rude Boys), an Irish acoustic group
- Orbs (band), a rock group featuring members of Between the Buried and Me and Fear Before the March of Flames
- Orb (Boiled in Lead album), 1990
- Orb (Alastair Galbraith album), 2007

=== Television and computer games ===
- "Orb" (Adventure Time), a television episode
- Ultraman Orb, a 2016 Japanese tokusatsu television series
- O.R.B: Off-World Resource Base, a 2002 computer game

== Computing ==
- Object request broker, a distributed computing concept
- Orb (software), a streaming media application
- Orb Drive, a 3.5-inch removable hard disk drive
- Oriented FAST and rotated BRIEF (ORB), an image processing method
- Open Relay Behavior-modification System (ORBS), a defunct system for blocking suspected Internet spam sites

== Celestial matters ==
- Orb (astrology), a measurement of object interaction
- Celestial orb, a central concept in ancient and early-modern astronomy

== Business ==
- ORB International, a London-based polling agency
- Orb Publications, an Australian publishing company
- Orbital Sciences Corporation (former NYSE stock ticker: ORB)
- Ostdeutscher Rundfunk Brandenburg, a former German public broadcasting organization

== Places ==
- Orb (river), in southern France
- Orb (Kinzig), a tributary of the Kinzig river in Germany

== Products ==
- O-ring boss seal, a hydraulic fitting
- Organic radical battery, a type of rechargeable battery
- The trademarked symbol printed on genuine Harris Tweed
- Orb (optics), an optical artifact

== Transport ==
- ORB, IATA code for Örebro Airport in Sweden
- ORB, FAA code for Orr Regional Airport in Minnesota
- ORB, Amtrak code for Old Orchard Beach station in Maine
- ORBS, former ICAO code for Baghdad International Airport

== See also ==
- Orbe (disambiguation)
- Orbis (disambiguation)
- Ball lightning
- Sprite (folklore)
