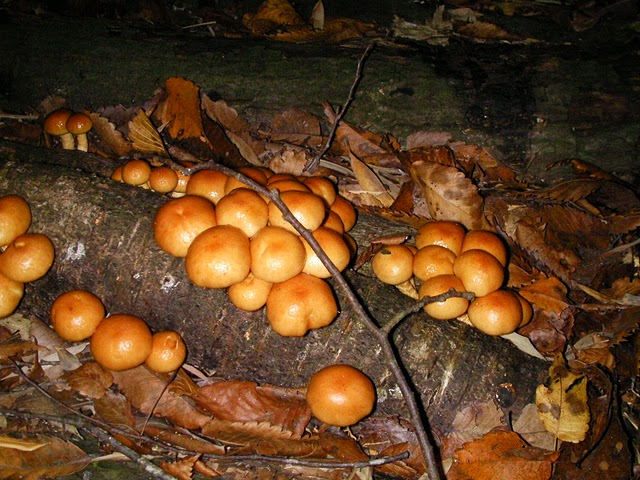

Scientific classification
- Kingdom: Fungi
- Division: Basidiomycota
- Class: Agaricomycetes
- Order: Agaricales
- Family: Strophariaceae
- Genus: Pholiota
- Species: P. microspora

Binomial name
- Pholiota microspora (Berk.) Sacc. (1887)

Synonyms
- Agaricus microsporus Berk. (1850); Collybia nameko T.Itô (1929); Pholiota nameko (T.Itô) S.Ito & S.Imai (1933); Pholiota glutinosa Kawam.(1954); Kuehneromyces nameko (T.Itô) S.Ito (1959)

= Pholiota microspora =

Species of fungus

Pholiota microspora, commonly known as Pholiota nameko or simply nameko (ナメコ), is a small, amber-brown mushroom with a slightly gelatinous coating that is used as an ingredient in miso soup and nabemono. In some countries this mushroom is available in kit form and can be grown at home. It is one of Japan's most popular cultivated mushrooms, tastes slightly nutty and is often used in stir-fries. They are also sold dried. Nameko is a cold triggered mushroom that typically fruits in the fall months when the temperature drops below 10°C for the first time, and flushes twice a few weeks apart.

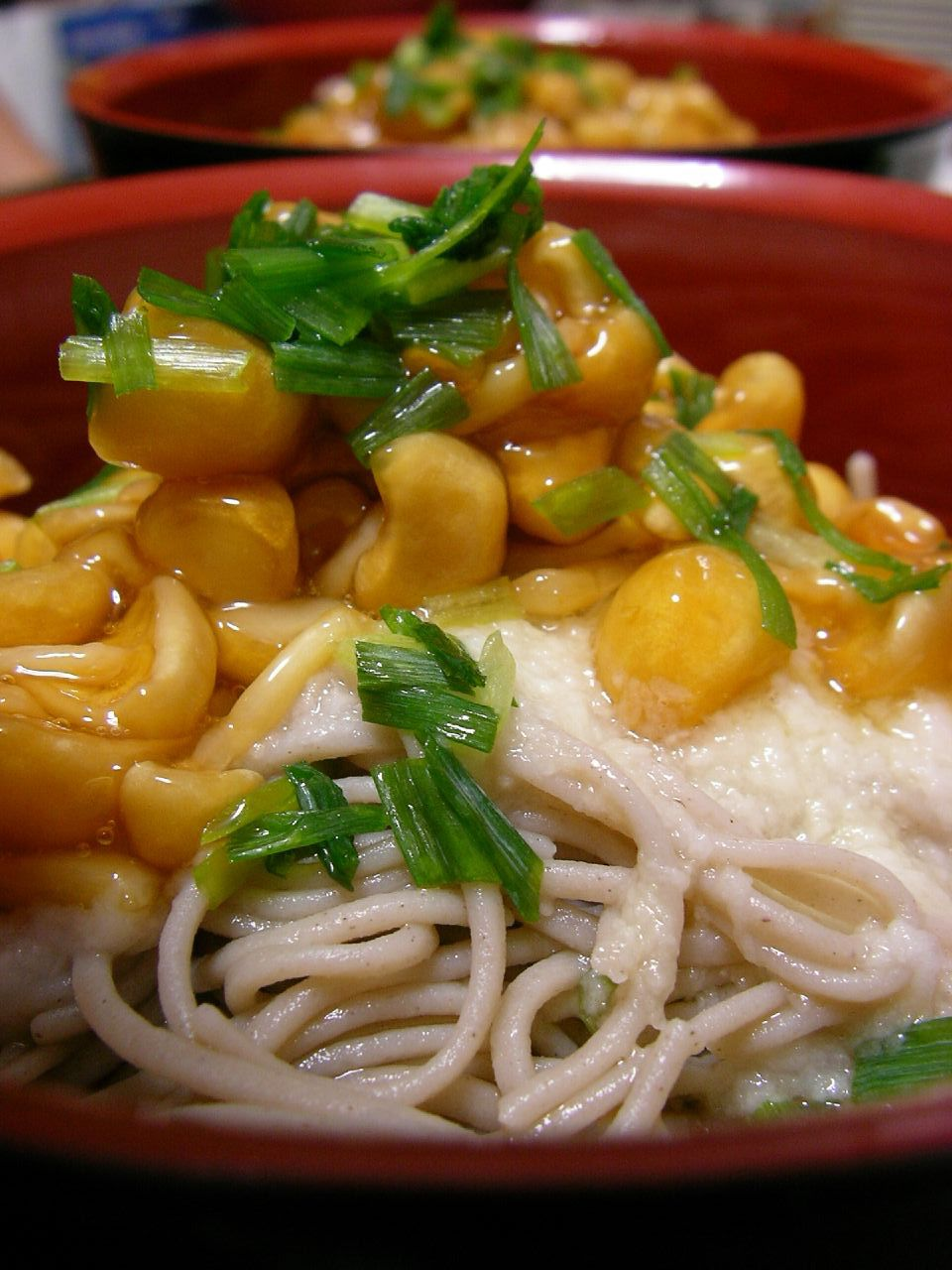
A bowl of nameko soba

In Mandarin Chinese the mushroom is known as 滑子蘑; (Pinyin: huá zi mó) or 滑菇; (Pinyin: huá gū).

In America the mushroom is sometimes called a "butterscotch mushroom".

== See also ==
- List of Pholiota species
