= Ichijū-sansai =

Japanese dining format

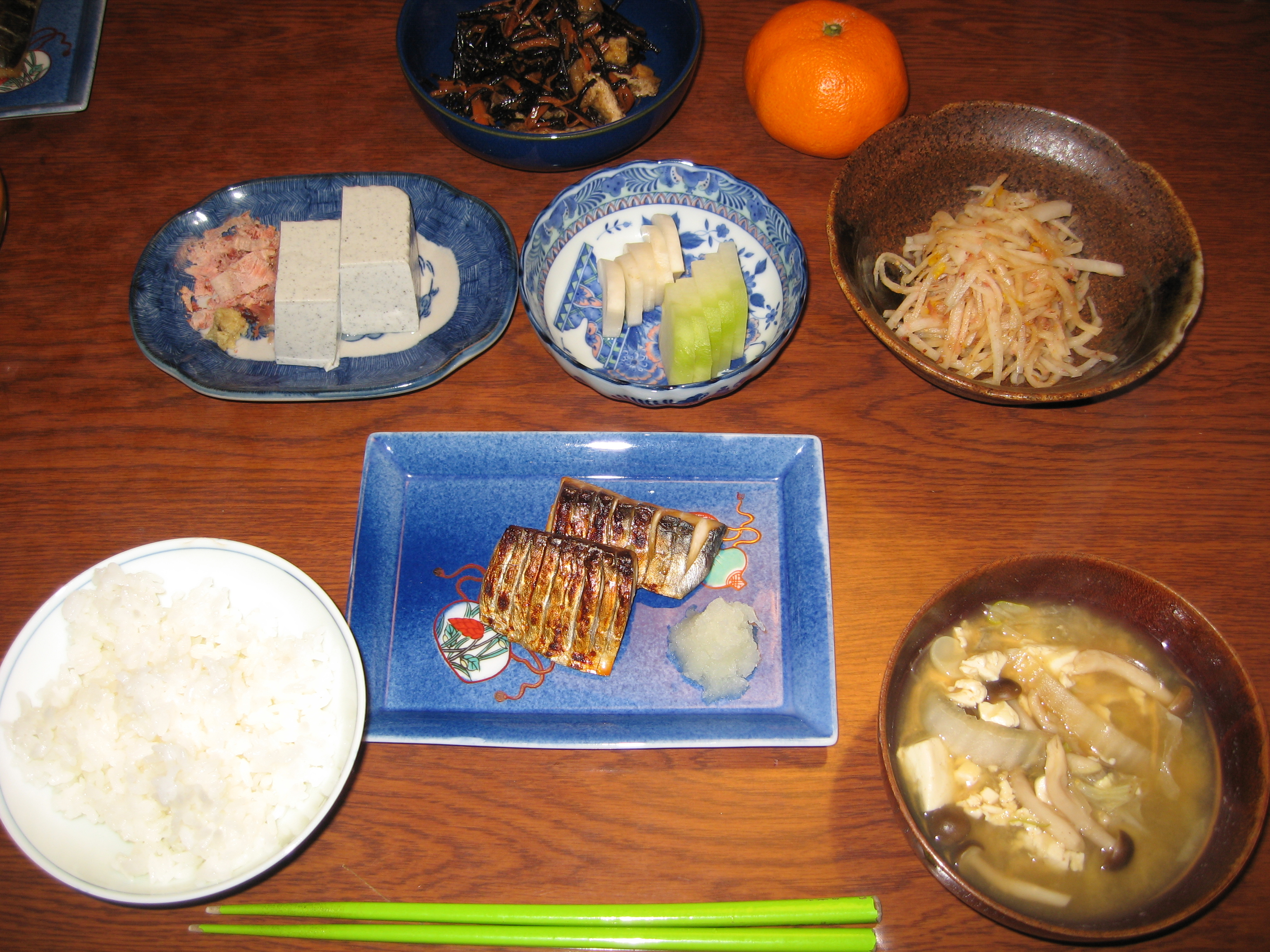
- A classic ichiju-sansai meal consisting of a bowl of rice paired with a savory soup and protein, and complemented by an assortment of vegetable side dishes.
- Course: Main course
- Associated cuisine: Japan
- Serving temperature: Hot or room temperature
- Main ingredients: Rice with various side dishes

Ichijū-sansai (Japanese: 一汁三菜) 'one soup, three dishes' is a traditional Japanese dining format of a bowl of rice, soup, a main dish, and two side dishes. It is a key component of kaiseki cuisine and reflects the aesthetic and nutritional principles of Japanese meals.

== Historical background ==
The origins of ichijū-sansai can be traced back to Heian period court cuisine and evolved through the Muromachi period with the ceremonial dining practices of samurai. By the Edo period, the format became standardized. Variants of the meal include ichiju-nisai (one soup and two dishes) and even more elaborate forms like niju-go-sai (two soups and five dishes) and sanju-go-sai (three soups and five dishes).

Though the formal ichijū-sansai style declined after the Meiji period, its simpler forms, particularly ichijū-nisai, helped shape modern Japanese dining norms. The tradition found renewed relevance among the general populace during special occasions and rituals, influencing everyday meal structures and contributing to the contemporary image of washoku (Japanese cuisine).

== Meal composition ==
An ichijū-sansai meal typically includes:

- Main dish (Shusai): Often a protein source, such as meat or fish.
- Side dishes (Fukusai): Generally two vegetable-based dishes, which may include salads, pickles, or simmered vegetables.
- Rice: A staple in the Japanese diet.
- Soup: Commonly misoshiru (miso soup).

=== Modern context ===
In contemporary Japanese households, the ichijū-sansai meal often includes rice, soup, one main dish, and two side dishes, reflecting both nutritional needs and aesthetic presentation. The arrangement of the dishes also plays a crucial role. The ichijū-sansai meal pattern is believed to contribute to health, although there are concerns about excessive fat and salt intake.

== See also ==
- List of rice dishes
- Honzen-ryōri – a formal multi-course meal style that influenced ichijū-sansai
- Kaiseki – Japanese multi-course dining, often with seasonal ingredients, related to ichijū-sansai in concept and presentation
