= Gonzalo Rubio Orbe =

Ecuadorian anthropologist and politician (1909–1994)

Gonzalo Rubio Orbe (1909 – 24 October 1994) was born in Otavalo into a farming family, the second of seven children and the oldest of three sons. Rubio received a Doctorate in Education from the Central University of Ecuador, and then distinguished himself as an anthropologist and historian of the indigenista school. The Indigenistas were a radical group of intellectuals who placed the indigenous pre-Columbian heritage of Latin America on an equal footing to that of the Spanish conquistador heritage.

Rubio joined the Ecuadorian Socialist Party and carried out diplomatic service in Mexico and other parts of Central America. This enabled him to establish many contacts with indigenistas in other countries and established his international reputation in the field.

Later he became director of the Colegio Normal Juan Montalvo teacher training college in Quito, National Director of Education and Sub-director of the National Planning and Economic Co-ordination Committee (Junta Nacional de Planificación y Coordinador General Económico), he continued to lecture to university students until the last day of his life. He died suddenly of a heart attack after climbing 8 flights of stairs to deliver a lecture, owing to a broken elevator.

His principal work is The Ecuadorian Indians (Los Indios Ecuatorianos 1988), as well as a great number of articles in anthropological journals.

His brother Alfredo Rubio Orbe was a practising lawyer, but also contributed to indigenismo principally writing on legal issues relating to indigenous people.
