= Miso soup =

Japanese soup flavored with miso

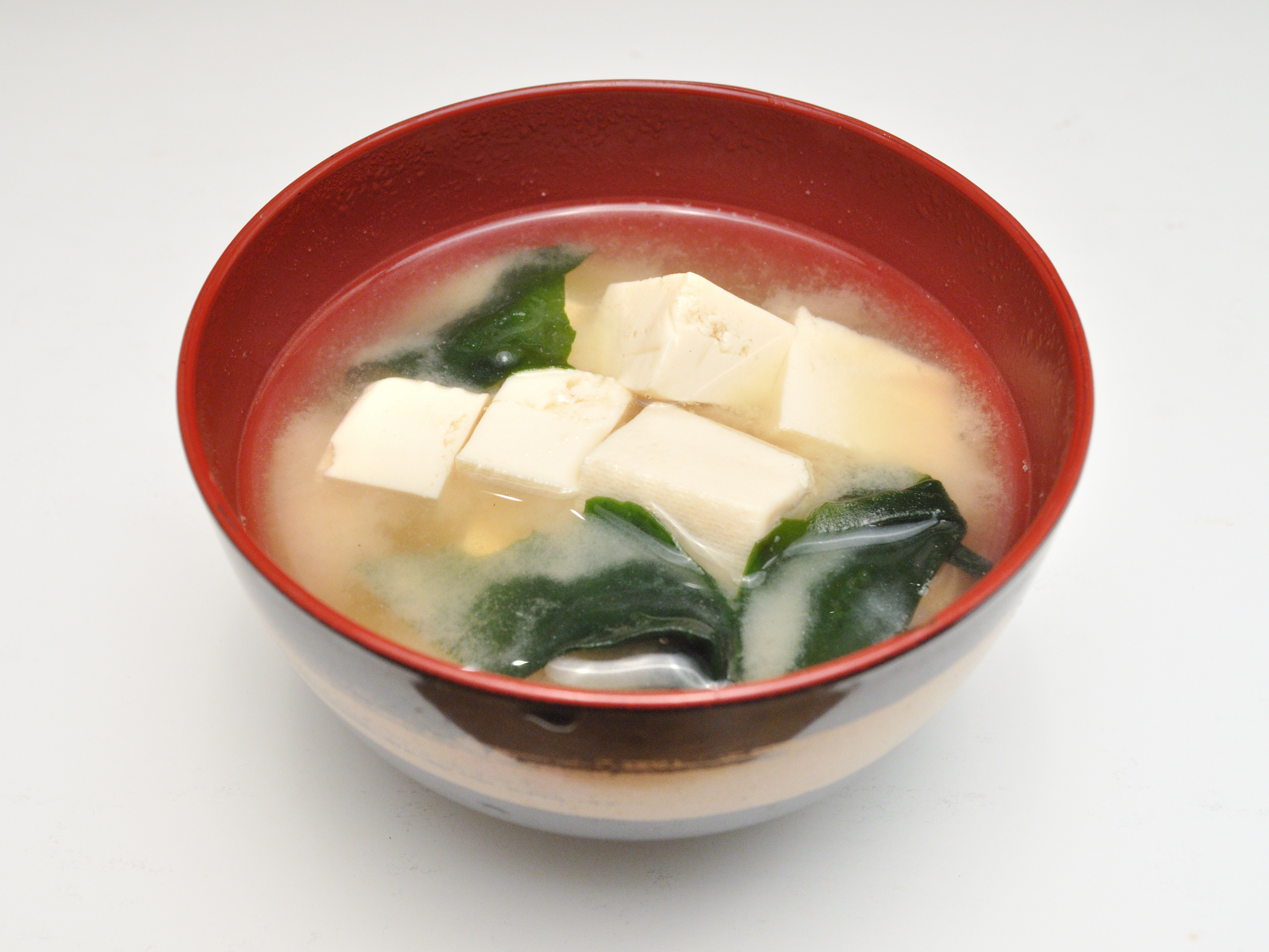
- Miso soup with tofu and wakame
- Type: Soup
- Place of origin: Japan
- Serving temperature: Hot
- Main ingredients: Dashi stock, miso paste
- Similar dishes: Doenjang-guk, doenjang-jjigae

Miso soup (味噌汁 or お味噌汁, miso-shiru or omiso-shiru; お-/o- being honorific) is a traditional Japanese soup consisting of miso in a dashi stock. It is commonly served as part of an ichijū-sansai (一汁三菜) meal 'one soup, three dishes' consisting of rice, soup, and side dishes. Optional ingredients based on region and season may be added, such as wakame, tofu, negi, abura-age, and mushrooms. Along with suimono (clear soups), miso soup is one of the two basic soup types of Japanese cuisine. It is a representative of soup dishes served with rice.

Miso soup is also called omiotsuke (御御御付) in some parts of Japan, especially around Tokyo.

== Miso ==
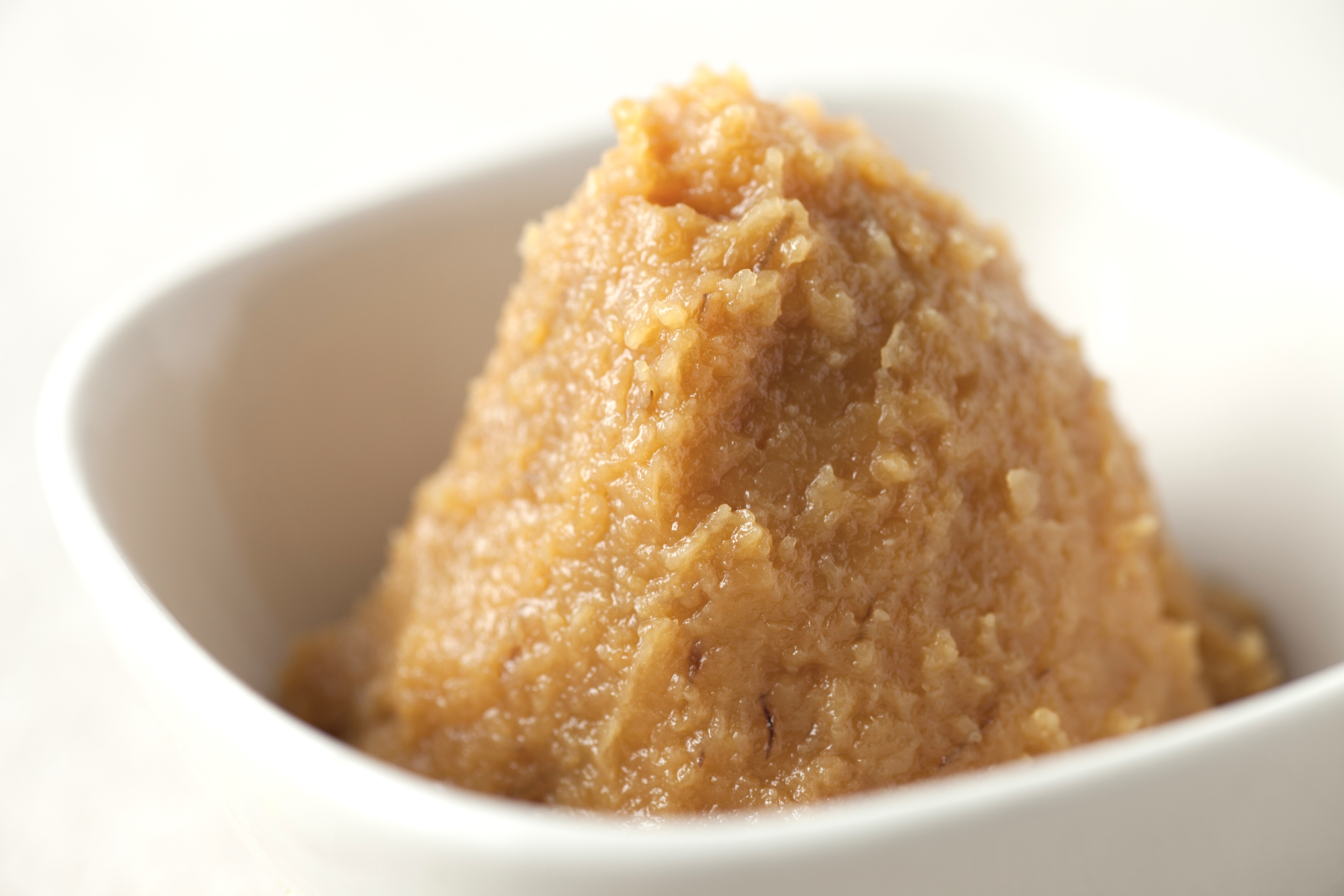
Miso is added to water or broth to make miso soup.

The type of miso chosen for the soup defines a great deal of its character and flavor. Miso is a Japanese seasoning produced by fermenting soybeans with salt and the fungus Aspergillus oryzae, known in Japanese as kōjikin (麹菌), and sometimes rice, barley, or other ingredients. It can be categorized as red (akamiso), white (shiromiso), or mixed (awase). There are many variations, including regional variations such as Shinshū miso or Sendai miso.

The fermentation time affects the flavor: short fermentation, as for white miso, provides a lighter, sweeter flavor, while longer fermentation, as for red miso, gives the miso soup a stronger, deeper flavor.

More than 80% of Japan's annual production of miso is used in miso soup, and 75% of all Japanese people consume miso soup at least once a day.

== Stock ==
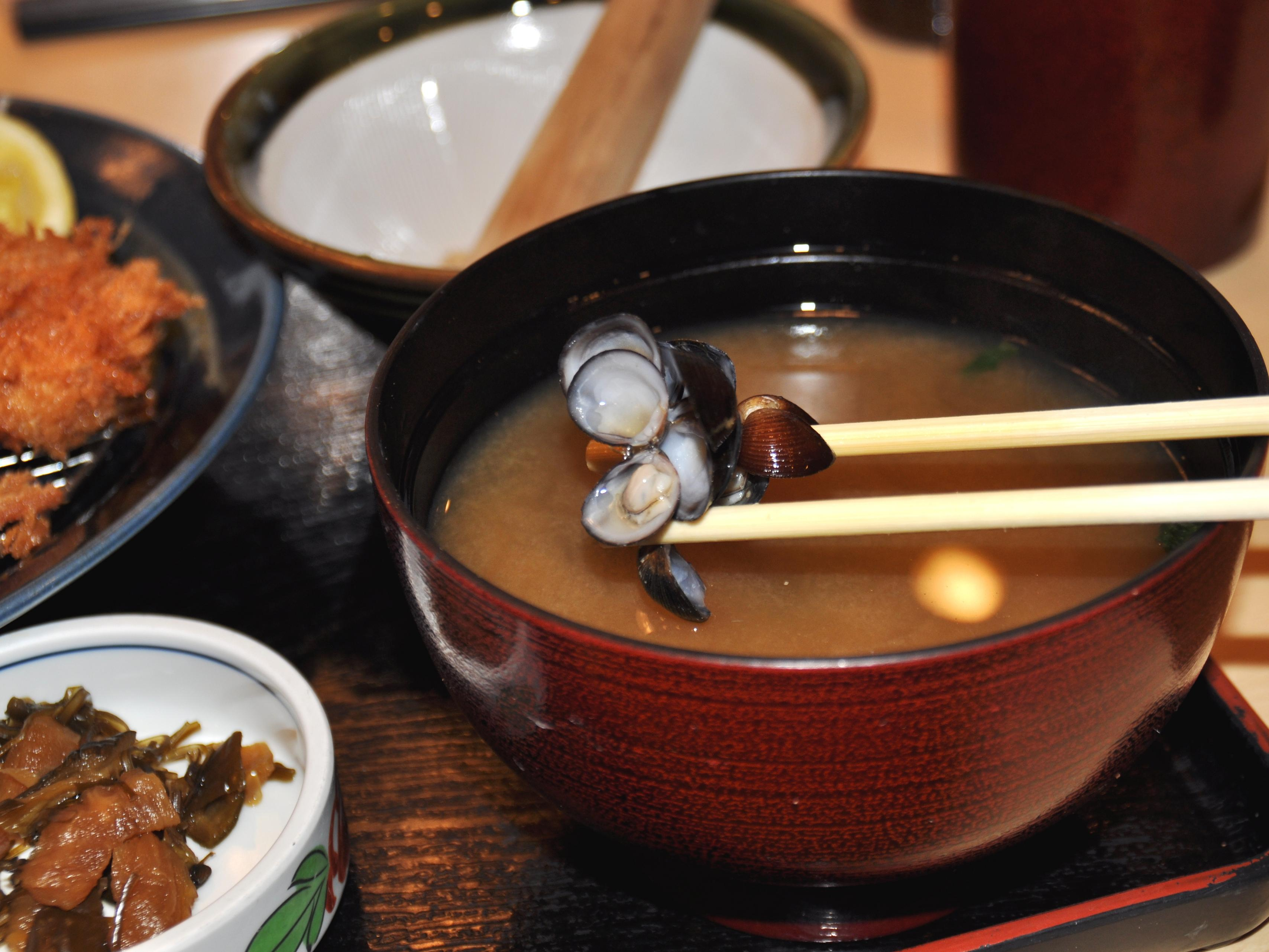
Miso soup with shijimi clams

The most common dashi stocks for miso soup are made of niboshi (dried baby sardines), kombu (dried kelp), katsuobushi (thin shavings of fermented, dried, and smoked bonito), or hoshi-shiitake (dried shiitake). The kombu can also be used with katsuobushi or hoshi-shiitake. Kelp or shiitake dashi give a vegetarian soup stock.

When the soup includes clams such as asari, shijimi, or hamaguri, prepared dashi is often not used.

Outside Japan, American- or European-style miso soup is sometimes made by dissolving miso in a Western vegetable stock. It can also be made with chicken broth. The stock might include ingredients such as negi, carrot, potato and daikon radish. In some versions of the dish, chicken stock, Western-style fish stock, and other non-dashi bases can even be used, but there is some debate over whether or not miso soups made using these non-traditional bases count as true miso soup.

== Other ingredients ==
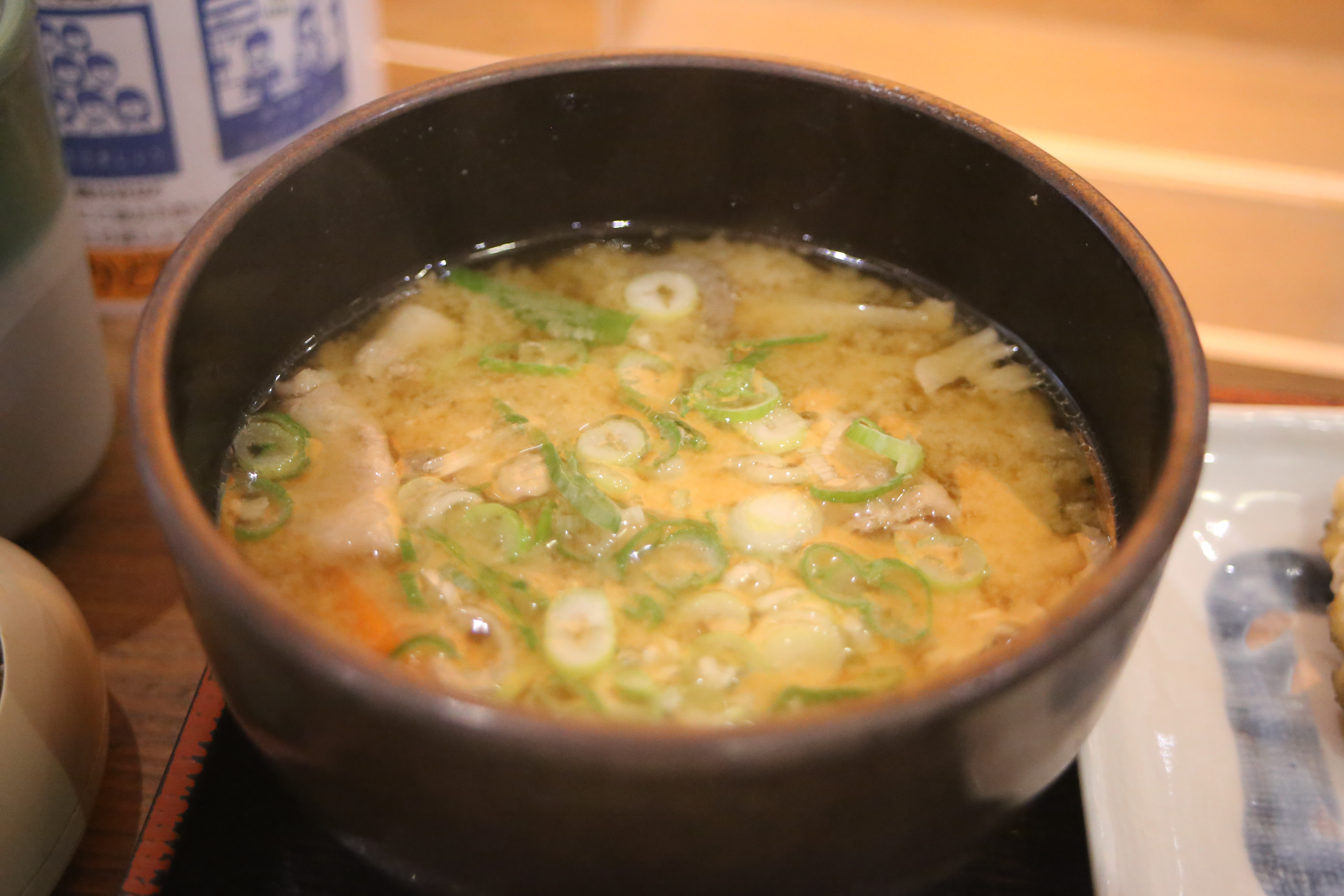
Tonjiru style miso soup with negi

According to Japanese custom, ingredients are chosen to reflect the seasons and to provide contrasts of color, texture, and flavor. Thus negi and tofu, a strongly flavored ingredient mixed with a mildly flavored ingredient, are often combined. Ingredients that float, such as wakame seaweed, and ingredients that sink, such as potatoes, are also combined. Ingredients may include mushrooms (nameko or shiitake), potato, taro, seaweed, green laver, onion, nira, common bean, mitsuba, shrimp, fish, clams, and sliced daikon. Almost any Japanese ingredient may be added to some type of miso soup. However typical miso soup recipes contain a small number of additional ingredients beyond dashi stock and miso.

If pork is added to miso soup it is called tonjiru, meaning 'pork soup'. Tonjiru is a soup served for dinner and lunch and not usually eaten for breakfast.

Hearty and robust cold-weather variations may include daikon, deep-fried tofu (abura-age), potatoes, onions and dark miso. Lighter variations are better suited for spring and summer and made with ingredients such as cabbage, seri, myoga and/or eggplant.

== Preparation and serving ==
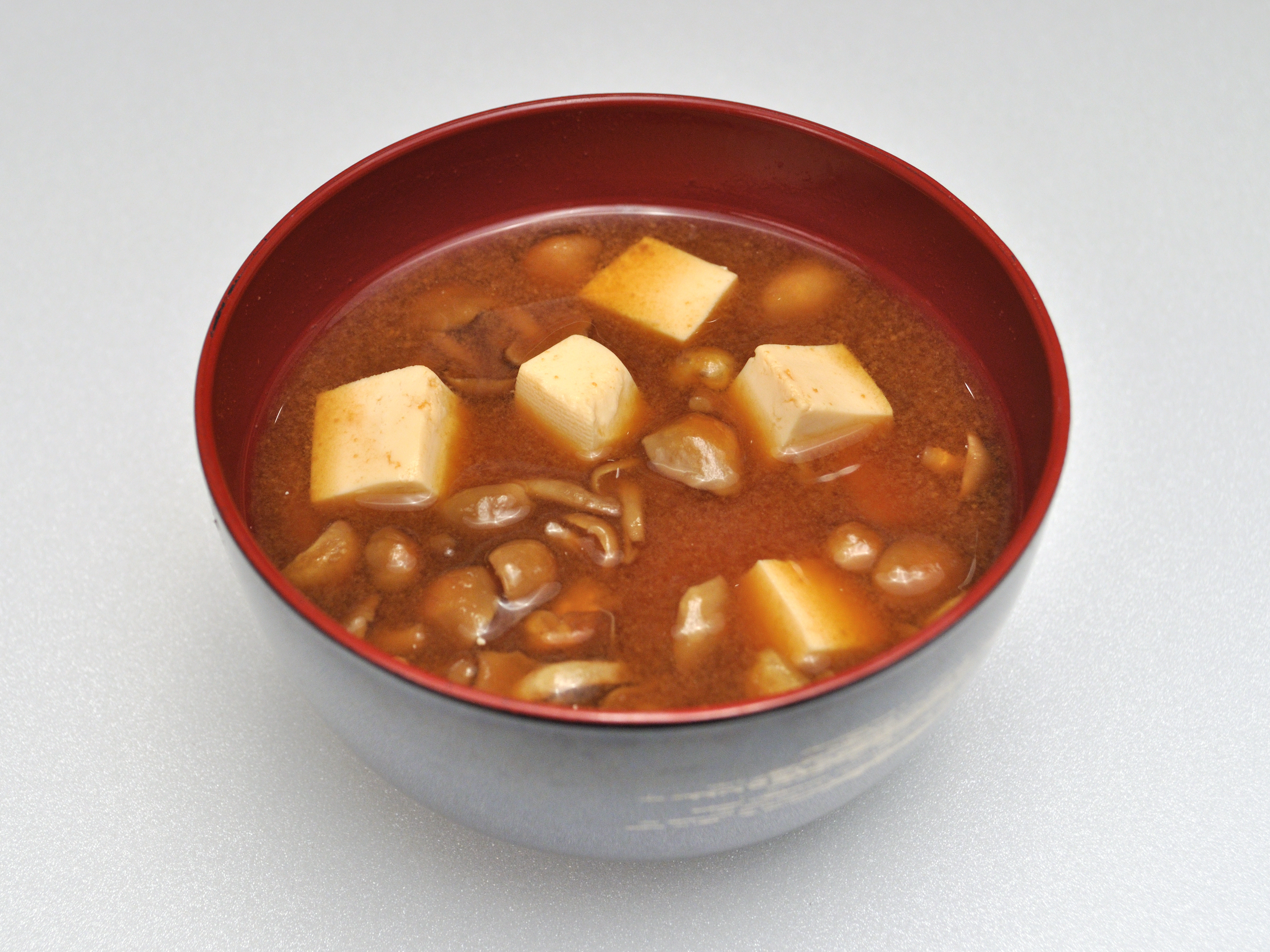
Red miso soup with tofu and nameko mushrooms

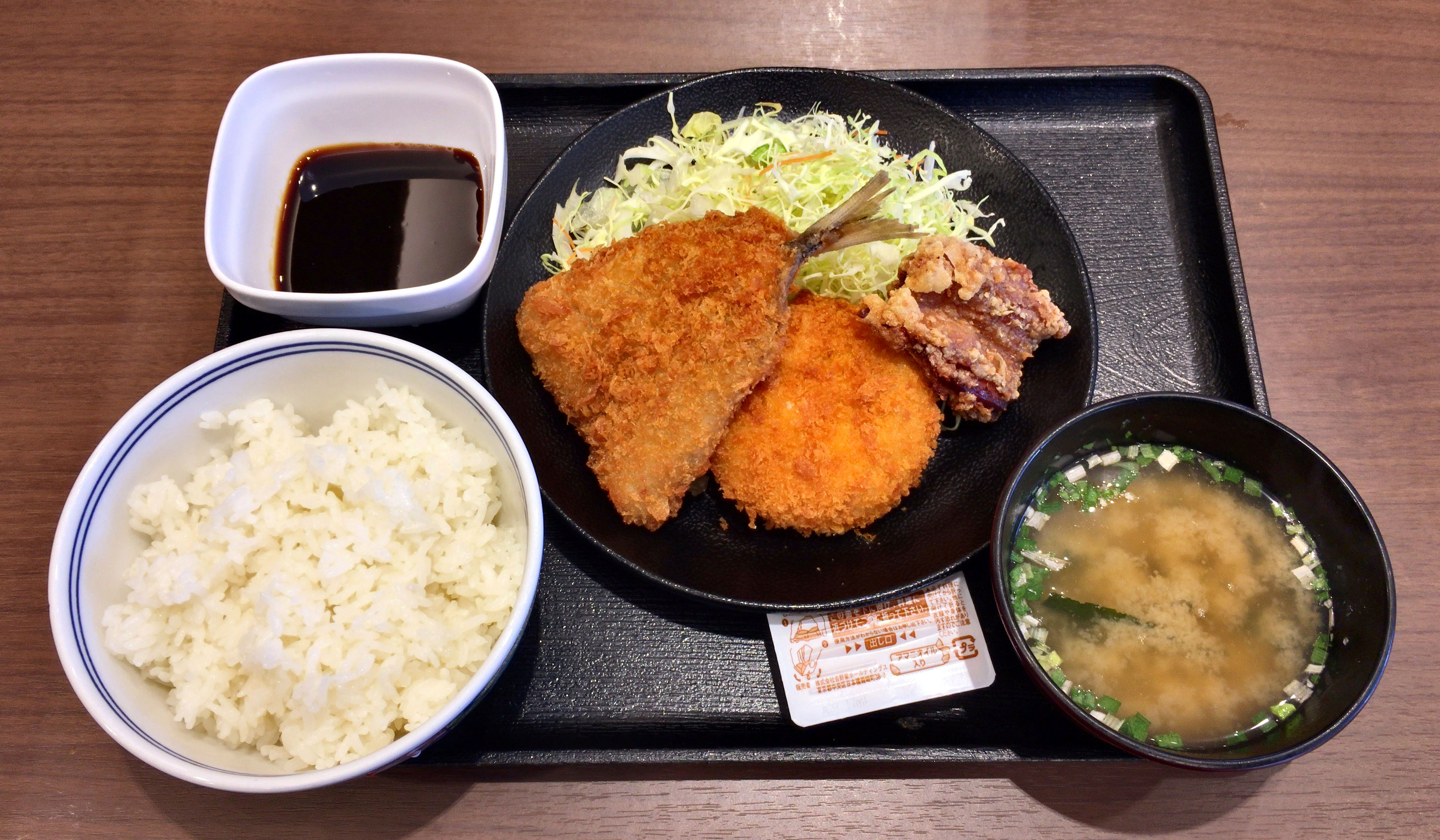
Miso soup is usually part of a Japanese teishoku (meal set), shown here with rice, fried aji, korokke and karaage.

Miso soup can be prepared in several ways, depending on the chef and the style of soup. Japanese recipes usually call for most vegetables to be cooked in the simmering dashi, particularly mushrooms, daikon, carrots, potatoes, tofu, and fish. There is a common myth that when miso paste is heated, the microorganisms are killed and the health benefits are reduced, but this is incorrect. In fact, the health benefits are due to nutrients produced by enzymes produced during the miso making process, not the bacteria in the miso.

Miso soup and white rice are the central dishes of the traditional Japanese breakfast. The soup has been a favorite of commoners and royalty alike for many centuries, but there are also many other dishes involving breakfast. They are all quite small, some include egg, fish, and nattō which is a fermented soybean. The soup is usually served in lacquer bowls with lids and drunk directly from the bowl, though the solid ingredients are eaten with chopsticks. The bowl sometimes has a lid to keep heat and aroma in as well as to improve the presentation.

=== Instant miso soup ===
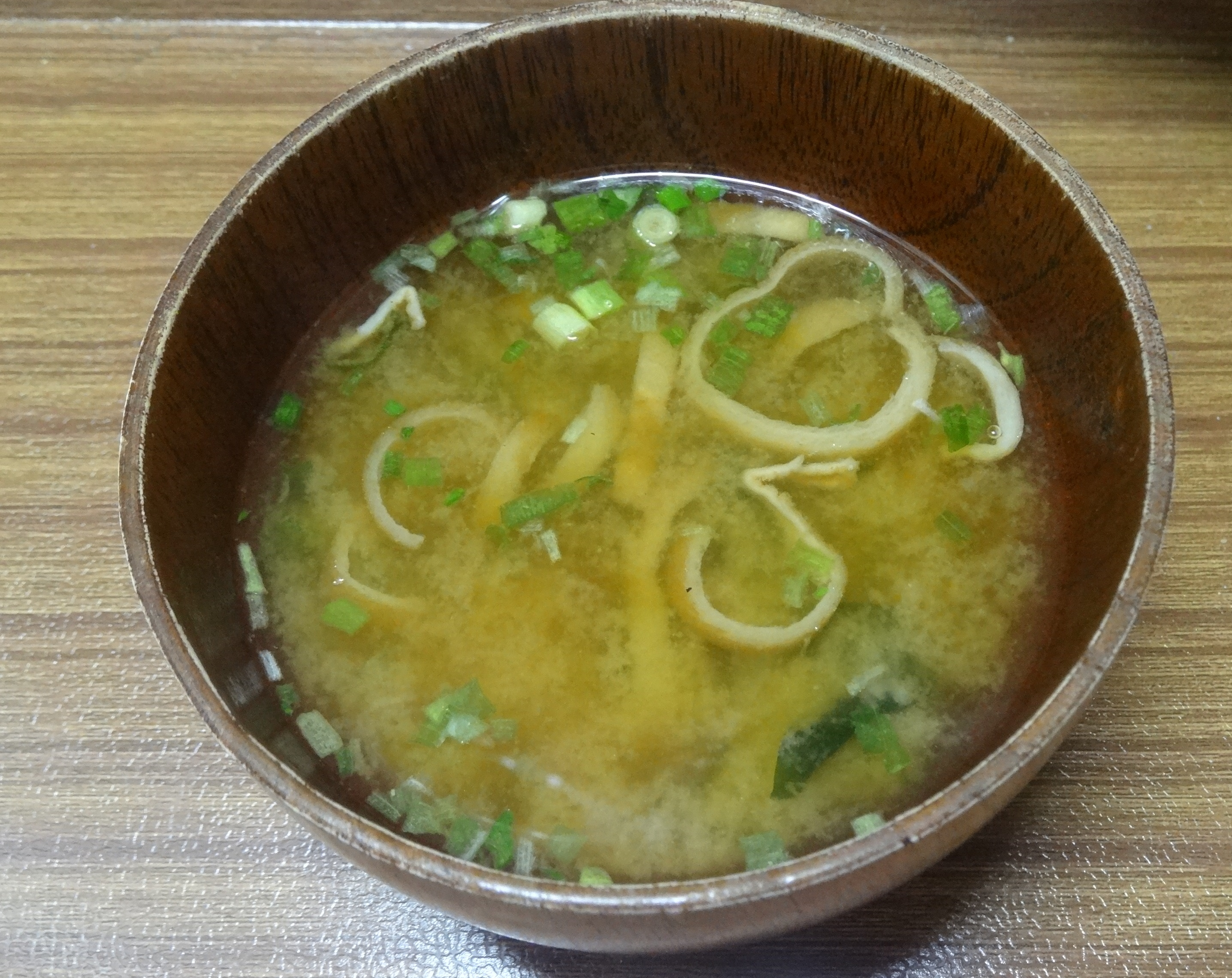
Instant miso soup

Instant miso soup is available in single-serving packets. It is usually sold in dehydrated powder and paste forms, and sometimes freeze dried. It generally contains dried toppings such as wakame and tofu with soybeans that reconstitute rapidly on the addition of hot water. These are popular in the Japanese workplace, where miso soup can be made with lunch as easily as tea. Instant miso soup is available in many grocery stores outside Japan and has a shelf life of 3 to 12 months.

=== Wappani ===
Wappani (わっぱ煮), a miso-soup-based dish, is unique to Awashima island off the coast of Niigata, Japan. A cedar flask ("wappa") is filled with miso soup, fish and vegetables. It is then heated by dropping in hot rocks, which quickly brings it to a simmer. Hot rocks retain their heat for hours after being taken from the fire, so a hot meal can be prepared without the use of fire.

== Health benefits ==
The soybeans used to make miso contain compounds called isoflavones, which are categorised as antioxidants. These antioxidants neutralise free radicals in the body which can raise your risk of cancer.

In 2003, researchers at Japan's National Cancer Centre suggested that eating three or more bowls of miso soup every day could lower the risk of breast cancer in women.

Studies in 2020 showed that habitual consumption of miso soup has the effect of lowering blood pressure and heart rate, causing proliferation of good bacteria in the intestines and helping to prevent constipation.

A 2003 epidemiology study in Japan discovered that persons who consume miso soup daily have a lower risk of stomach cancer and heart disease. In 2019 research concluded that fermented soy foods, such as miso, have antidiabetic, antioxidant (anti-aging), anti-obesity, anti-inflammatory, anticancer and antihypertensive (lowering blood pressure) properties.

== Gallery ==
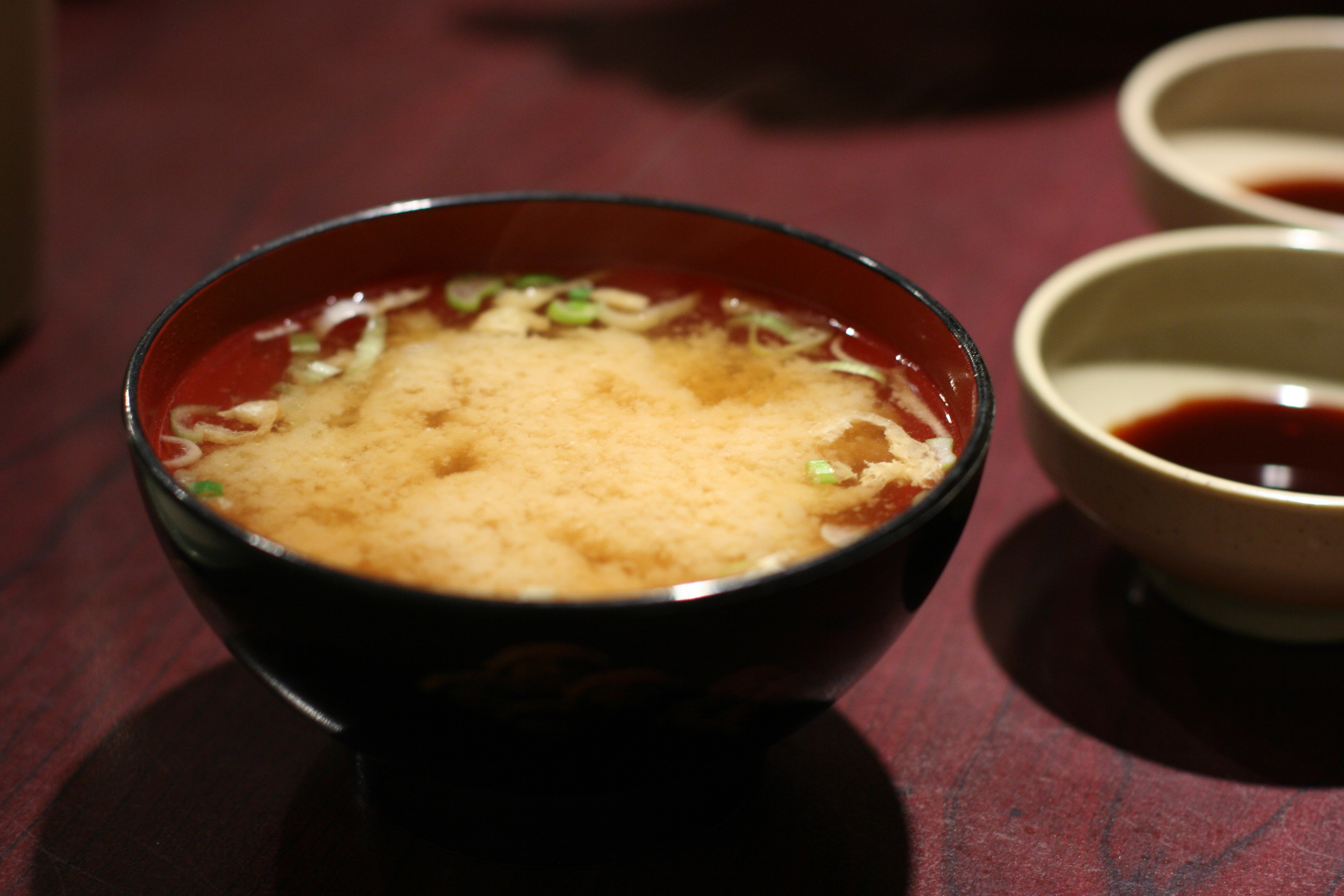
With egg

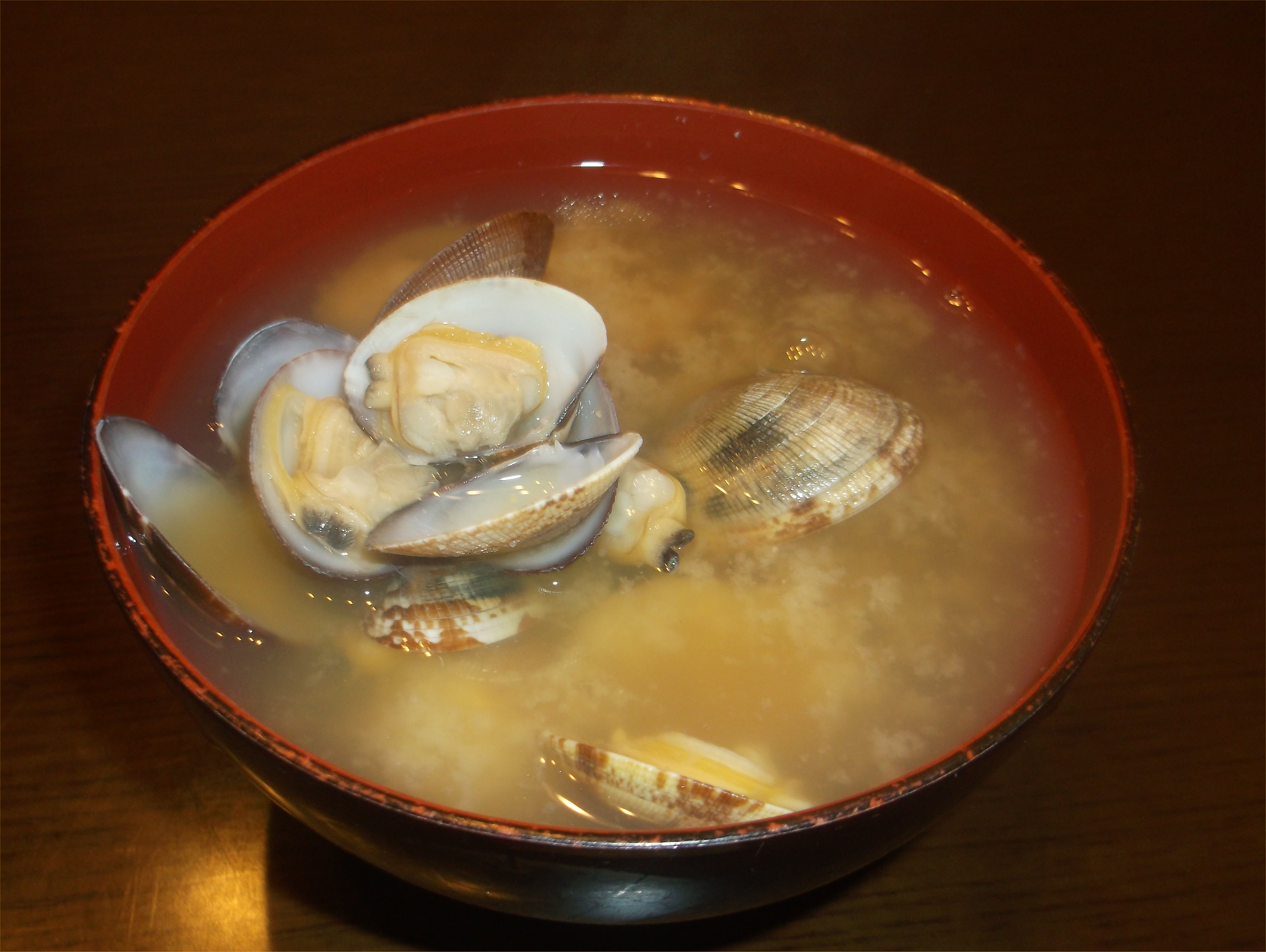
With asari clams

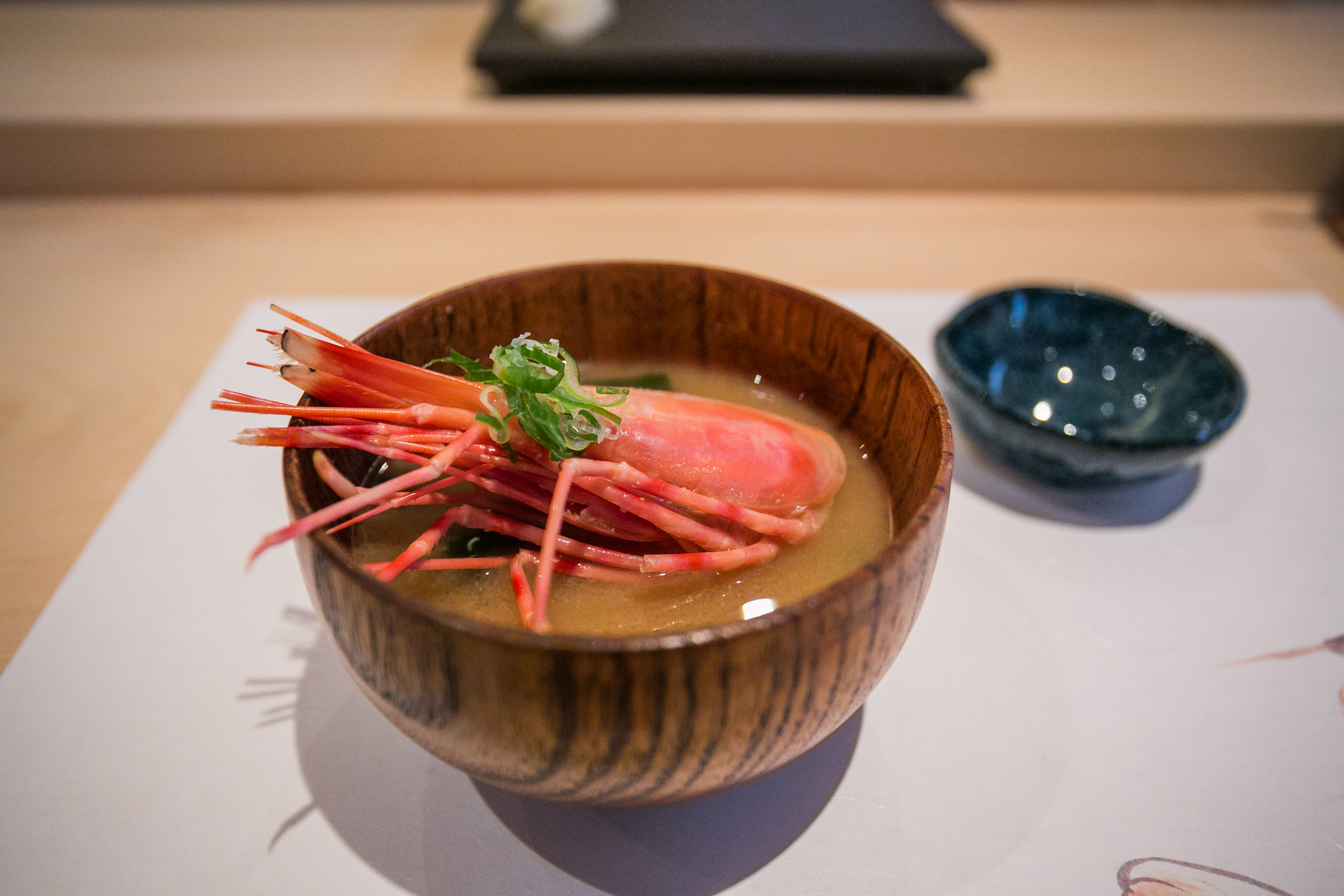
With shrimp head

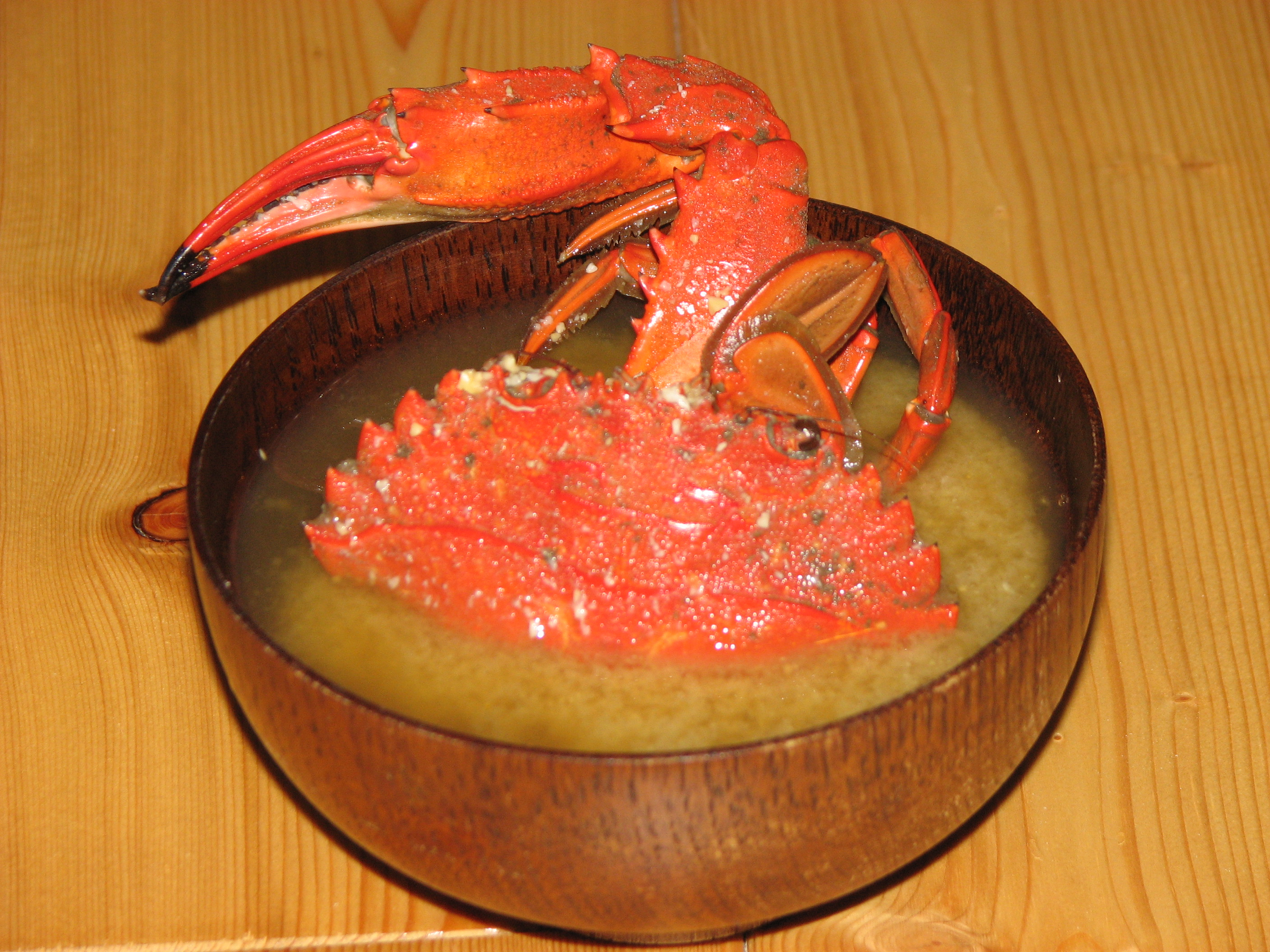
With ishigani crab

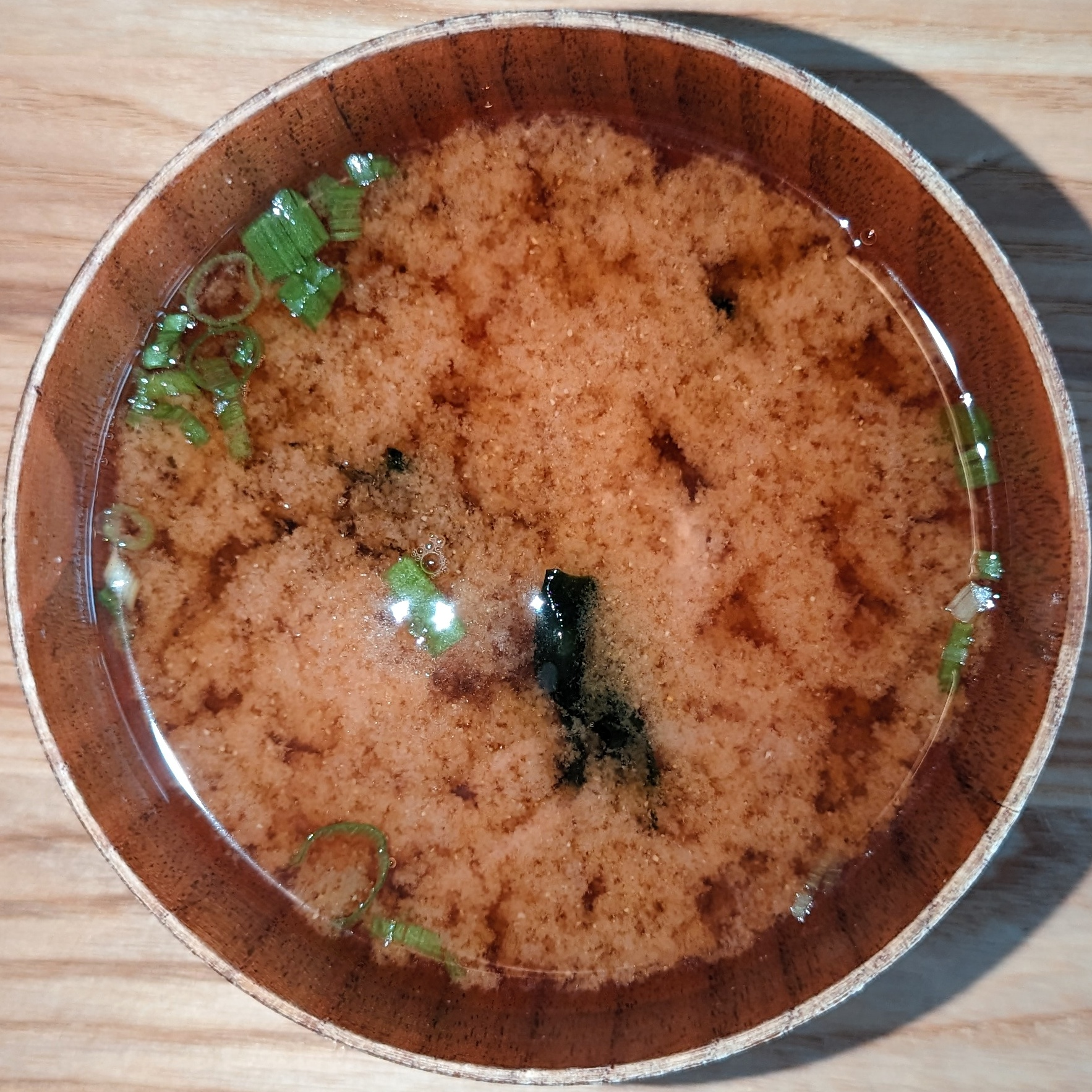
Red miso soup

== See also ==
- List of Japanese soups and stews
- List of soups
- Dashi
