= Abura-age =

Deep-fried tofu slices

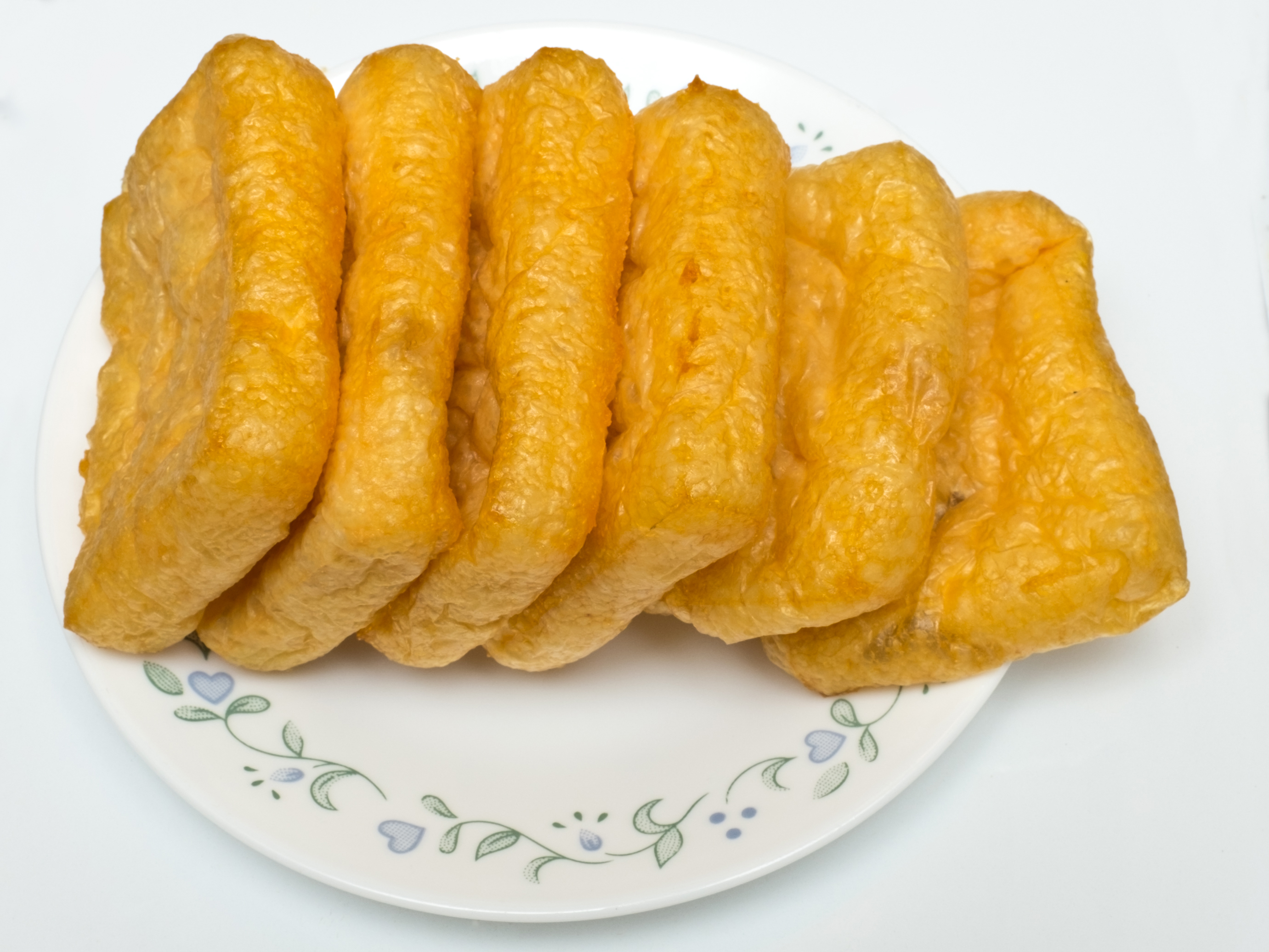
- Abura-age, or thin slices of fried tofu
- Type: Tofu
- Place of origin: Japan
- Main ingredients: Tofu
- Similar dishes: Tofu skin

Abura-age (油揚げ; lit. 'oil-fried') is a Japanese food product made from tofu. Thin slices of tofu are deep-fried, and the product can then be split open to form pouches. Abura-age is often used to wrap inari-zushi (稲荷寿司), and it is added to miso soup. It is also added to udon noodle dishes, which are called kitsune-udon because of legends that foxes (kitsune) like deep-fried tofu. Abura-age can also be stuffed, e.g. with nattō, before frying again. There is a thicker variety known as atsu-age (厚揚げ) or nama-age (生揚げ).

== Gallery ==
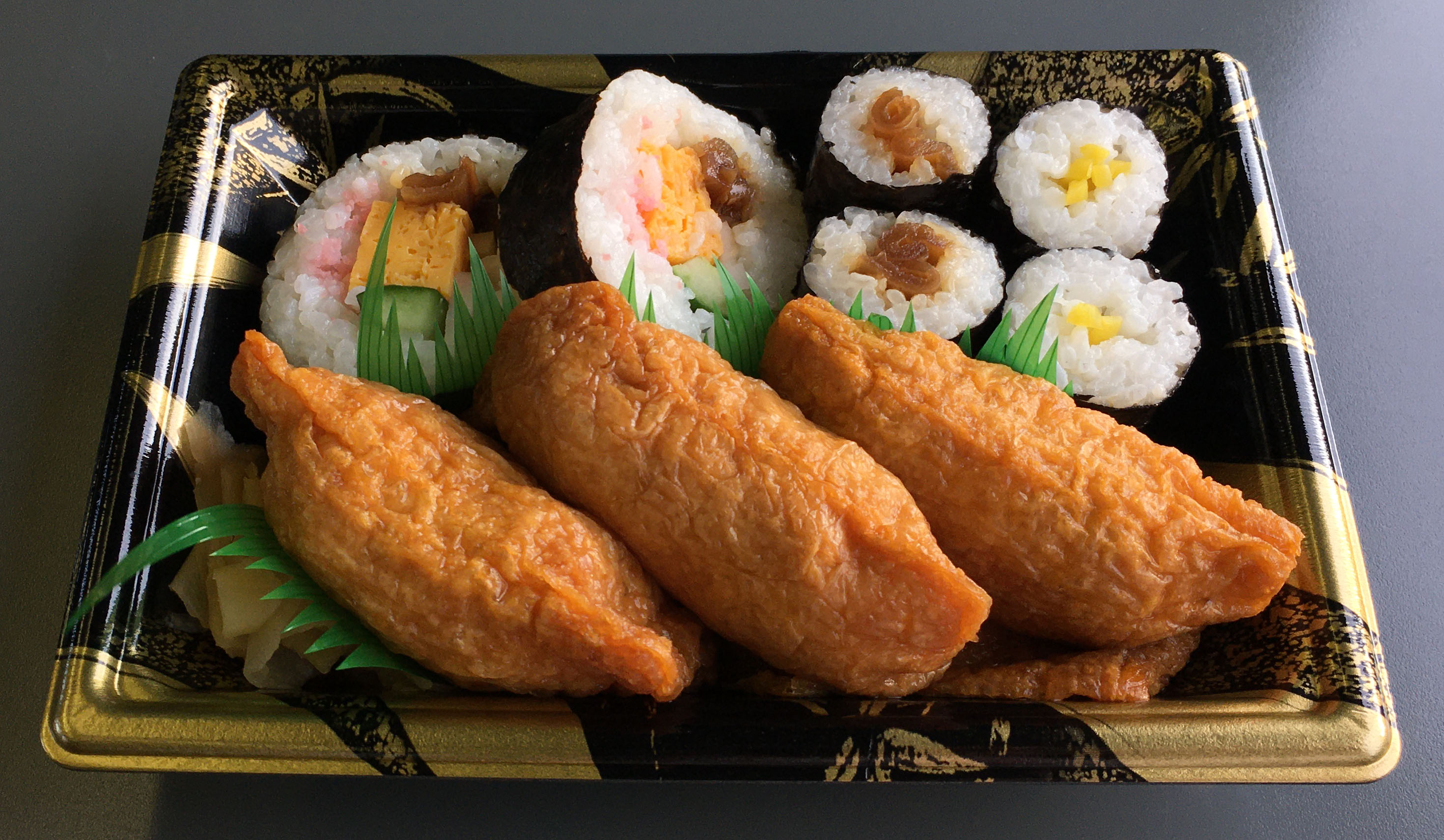
Inarizushi (bottom)

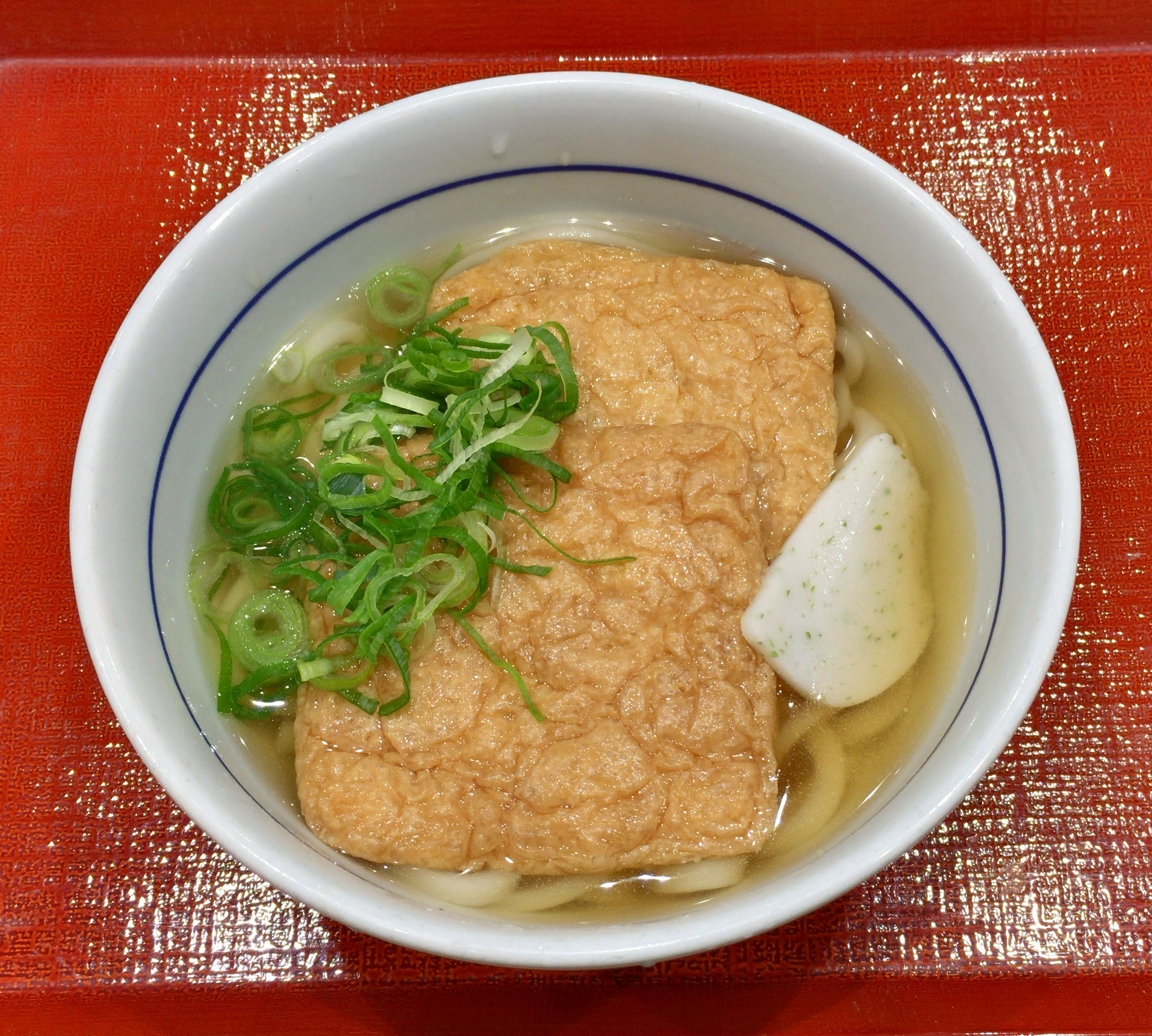
Kitsune udon

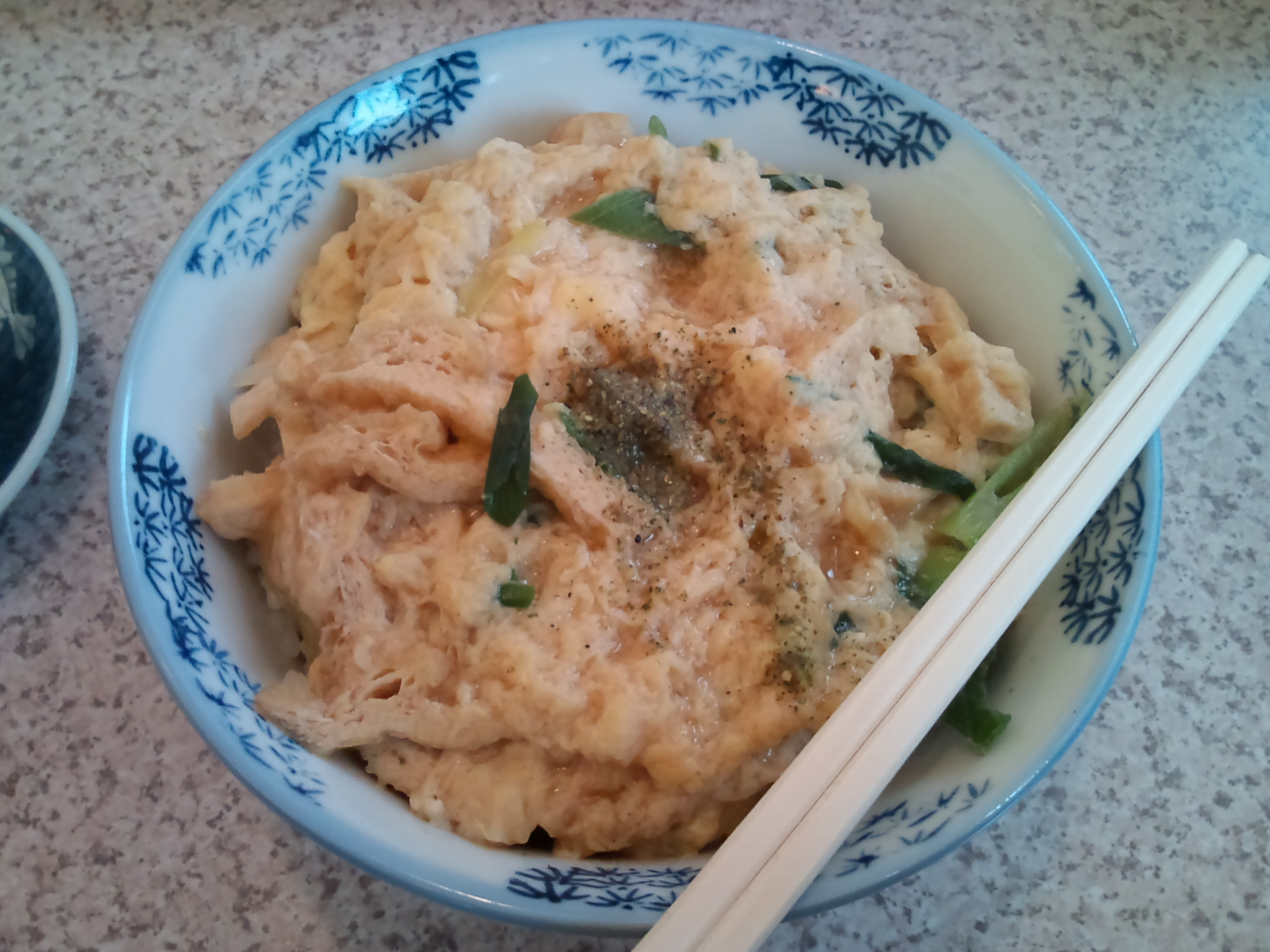
Kitsunedon

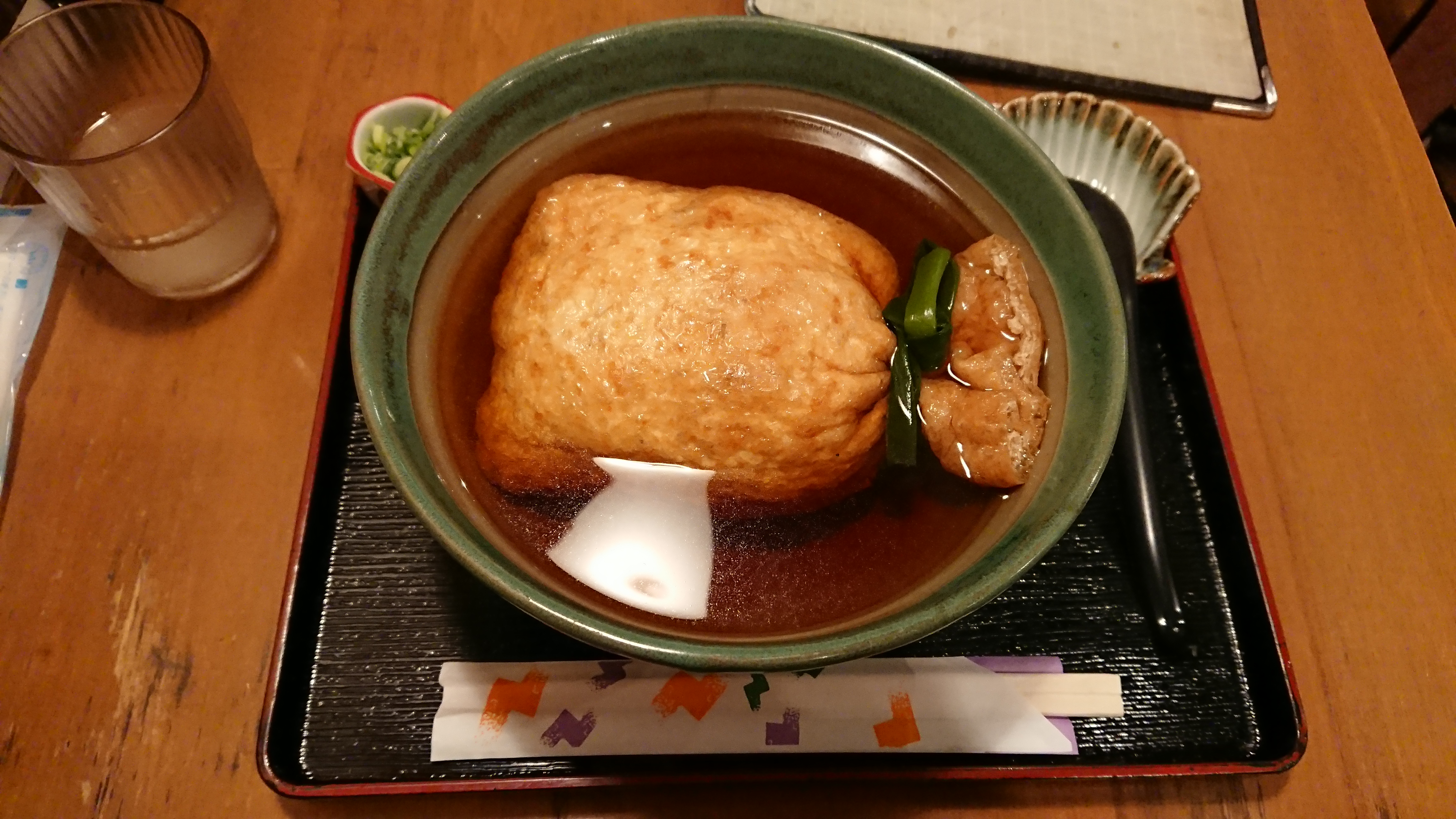
Kinchaku, stuffed tofu pouch in soup

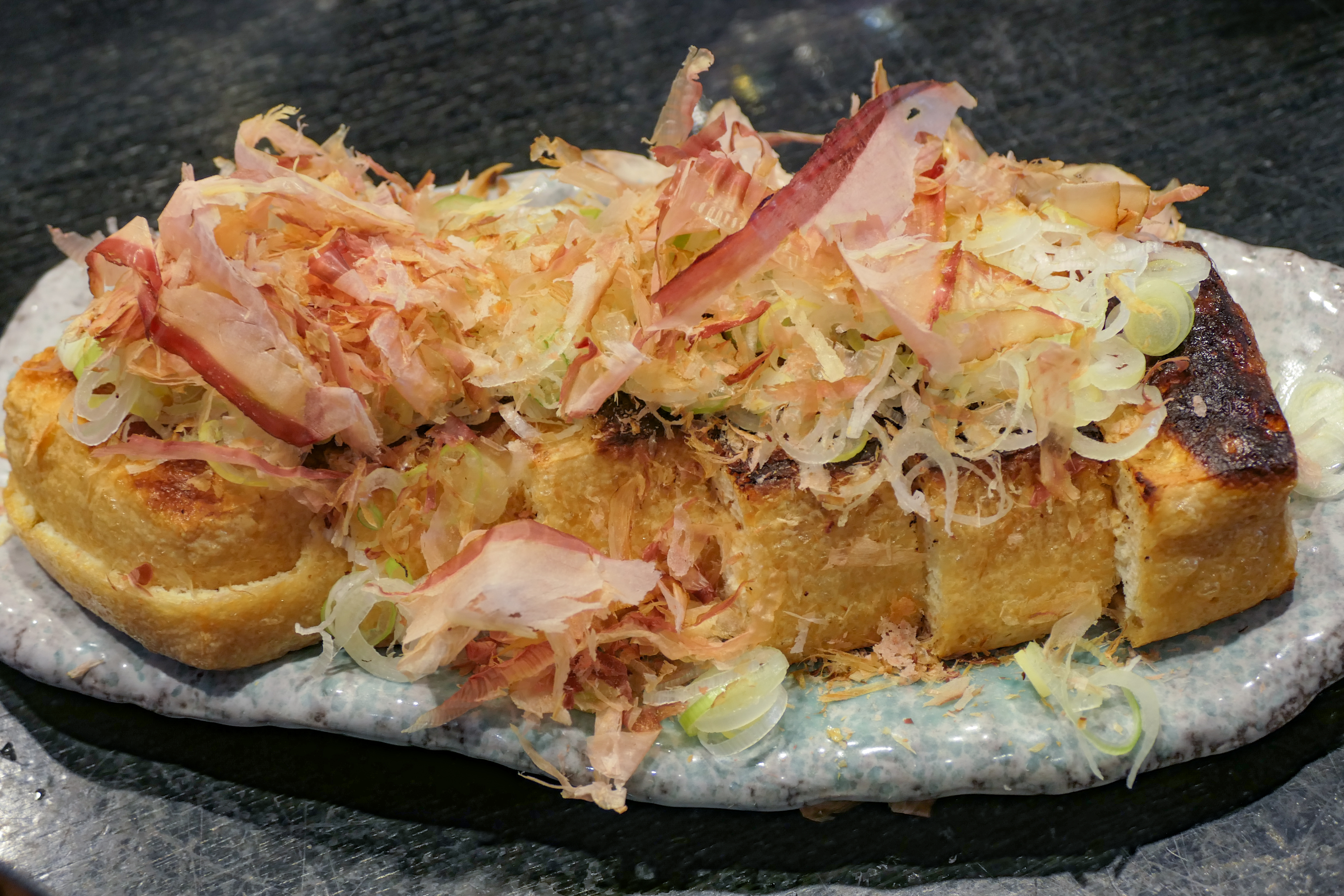
With katsuobushi flakes

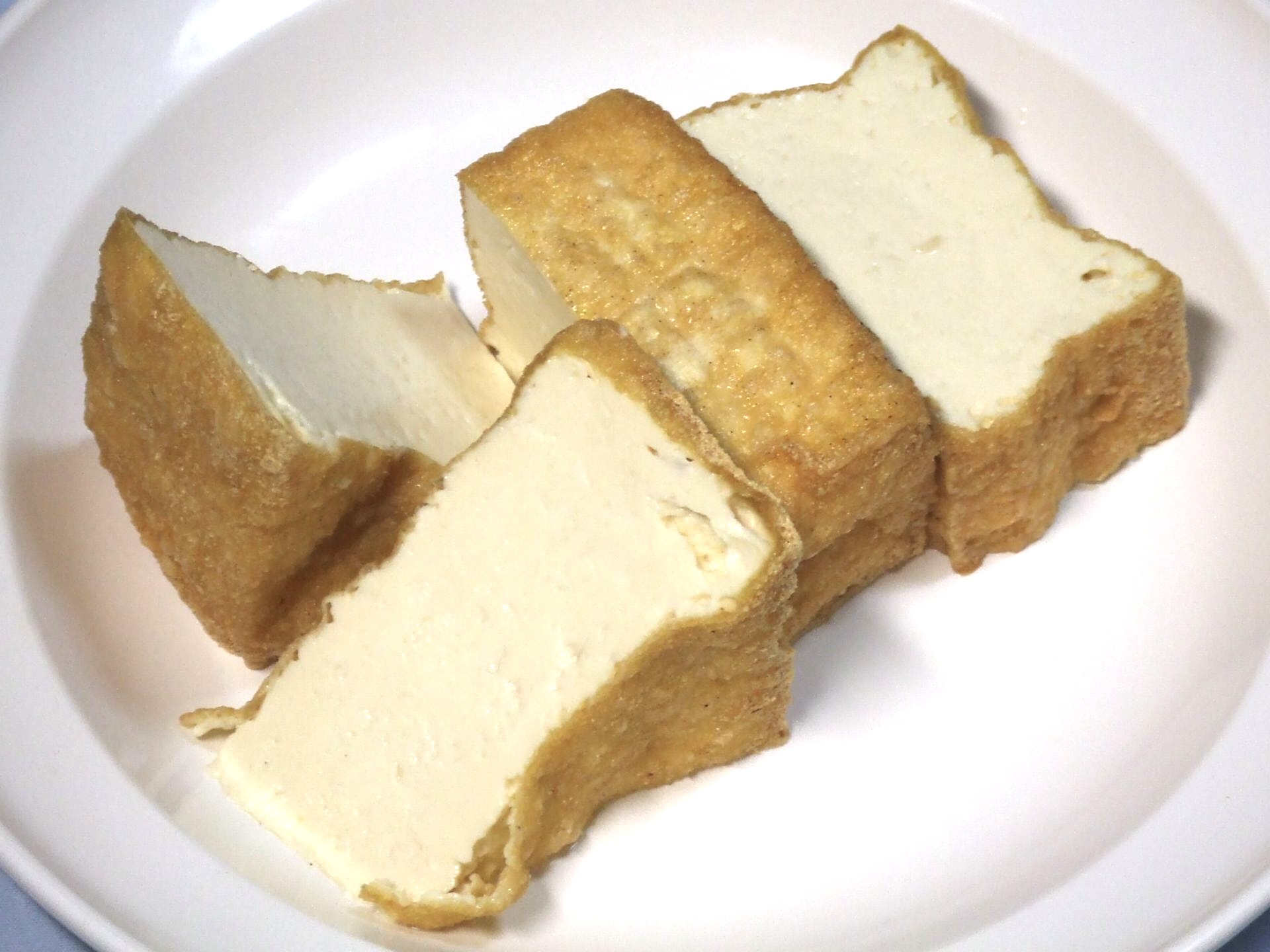
Atsu-age, a thicker variant

== See also ==
- Tofu skin
- Tempura – Japanese dish of battered, deep-fried fish or vegetables
- List of deep-fried foods
- List of soy-based foods
- Fu (麩)

== Bibliography ==
- Kenkyusha's New Japanese-English Dictionary, Kenkyusha Limited, Tokyo 1991, ISBN 4-7674-2015-6
