= Chompi =

Sampler released in 2023

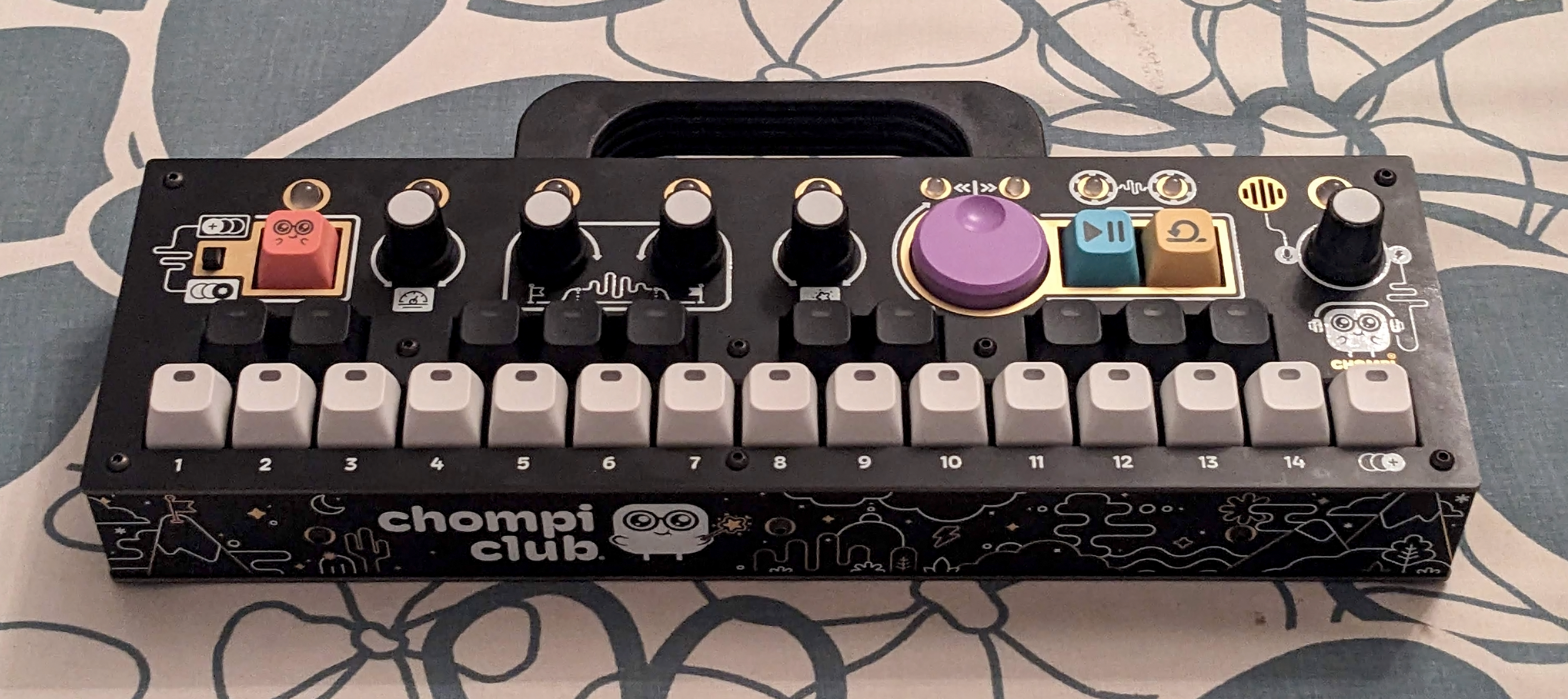
Standard black-and-gold Chompi

The Chompi (stylised as CHOMPI) is a sampler released in 2023 by Chelsea and Tobias Hendrickson, a couple from Spokane, Washington. Designed to be accessible and screenless, the sampler uses LEDs and physical labels to show its status; the design was inspired by Eurorack modules. Many effects are included, such as a filter and tape saturation. The Kickstarter campaign for Chompi was one of the most successful of 2023, raising over $900,000 in one day.

== Background ==
Chompi was created by Chelsea and Tobias Hendrickson, a couple from Spokane, Washington. They were introduced to synthesizers after spending time with a synthesizer group in New Zealand. Before making Chompi, they ran a community synth program focused on Spokane and the Pacific Northwest, which offered modular synth classes for around a decade. Chompi was announced on 12 March 2023, via a YouTube video on the Chompi Club channel; the video showcased the basic features of the sampler and looper, as well as the effects unit.

== Funding ==
The Kickstarter campaign for Chompi's funding launched on 28 March 2023 with a goal of $30,000, and raised over $900,000 in one day. By the end of the campaign it had raised over $1,000,000, making it one of the most successful Kickstarter campaigns of 2023. Chompi units were offered for $499 as part of the campaign, with a limited-edition pink version offered for $599.

== Production and design ==
Chompi is manufactured by Electro-Distro and uses the Daisy Seed, a microchip by Electro-Smith designed to create unique musical instruments. Many components are manufactured in the US. It was designed to be accessible and screenless, as Tobias has severe vision loss. Much of the workflow was developed by Tobias while completely blind between eye surgeries, using a 3D printed prototype model of Chompi. The creators also state that the screenless design invites users to explore. LEDs and physical labels are used to differentiate and show the status of various effects, such as a filter, tape saturation, and the "magic wand" - a combination of reverb and delay. Buttons on the device are toy-like and oversized, described by the creators as "chonky" (a play on the word "chunky") and "bubbly". Aspects of the design, such as visual customisability and the internal hardware, were inspired by Eurorack modules.

Chompi units ordered by Kickstarter supporters were shipped by January 2024; units then became available to the general public on the Chompi Club website with the price starting at $599.

== Reception ==
Many news outlets praised Chompi when it was announced, with the toy-like design being a frequent topic of discussion and many calling it "adorable".

On release, Hainbach reviewed Chompi, praising the effects and looper but criticising the lack of visual labels. Music YouTuber Ricky Tinez also reviewed Chompi, criticising the loud mechanical keys and lack of important features such as sample volume control. However, later firmware releases fixed bugs and added features such as sample pan and volume control, with the creators taking feature requests over Discord.

== Release to open source ==
In 2026, the Chompi Club website announced that the current version of the Chompi was to be discontinued, and that they were open-sourcing the design.
