= Itameshi =

Japanese-Italian fusion cuisine

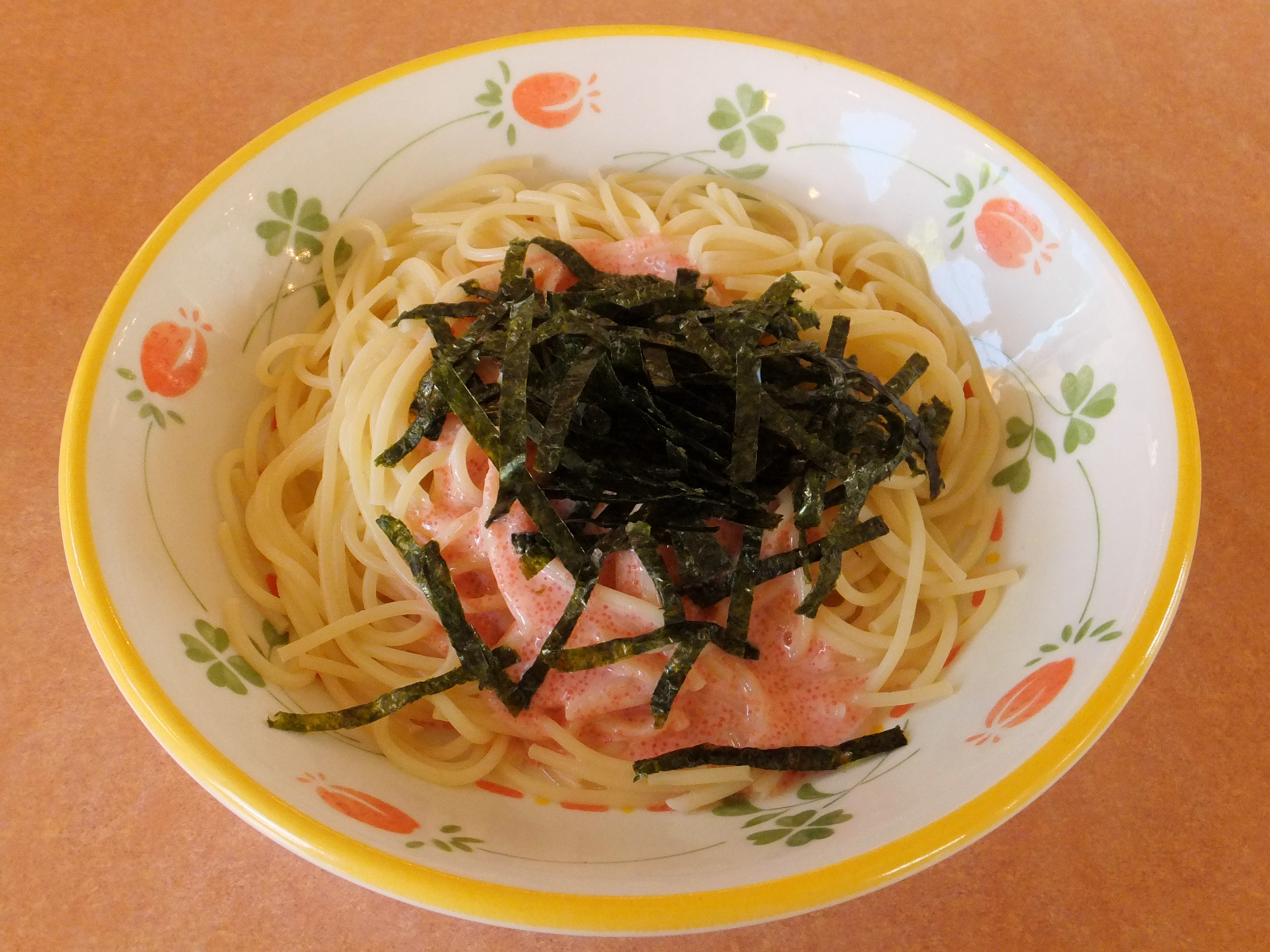
Spaghetti with tarako roe and nori, a common itameshi dish

Itameshi (Japanese: イタ飯) is a type of fusion cuisine originally from Japan that combines traditional elements of Japanese food and Italian food. The name comes from the combination of the Japanese name for Italy (イタリア Itaria) and the Japanese word for meal (飯, meshi). This term is used to differentiate Japanese-Italian fusion food from standard Italian food, which is formally referred to in Japanese as itaria-ryōri (イタリア料理).

== History ==
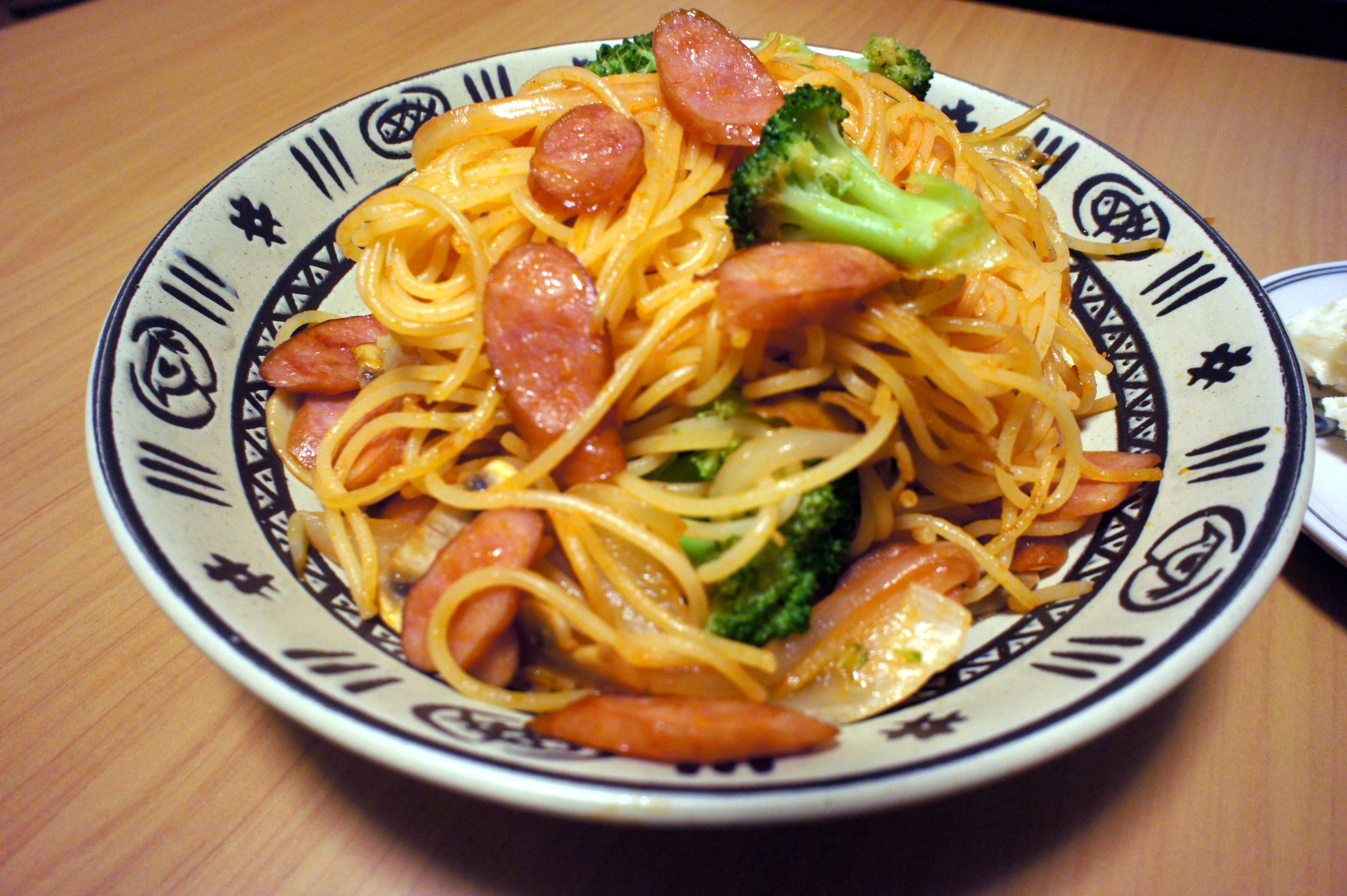
Naporitan, Japanese-style spaghetti with sausage and vegetables

The first Italian restaurant in Japan was Italiaken, opened in 1880 in Niigata by Pietro Migliore, who came to Japan with a French performing troupe. It later expanded into a hotel which is still in business today under the same name, although the eponymous restaurant is no longer in operation.

Italian-Japanese fusion first started in the 1920s when spaghetti was introduced to Japan, and served in small cafes. Before 1970, there were few authentic Italian restaurants in Japan, with only a few pizza and pasta stores. Italian food would not gain a bigger foothold in the country until the 1990s, when the 1997 Asian financial crisis hit and many upscale restaurants were affected by low wages and increased prices. Many of these restaurants and chefs turned to Italian food as a cheaper alternative and from there, Italian food became even more popular in the country.

The word itameshi became common in the early 1990s, during the Japanese asset price bubble.

== Restaurants ==
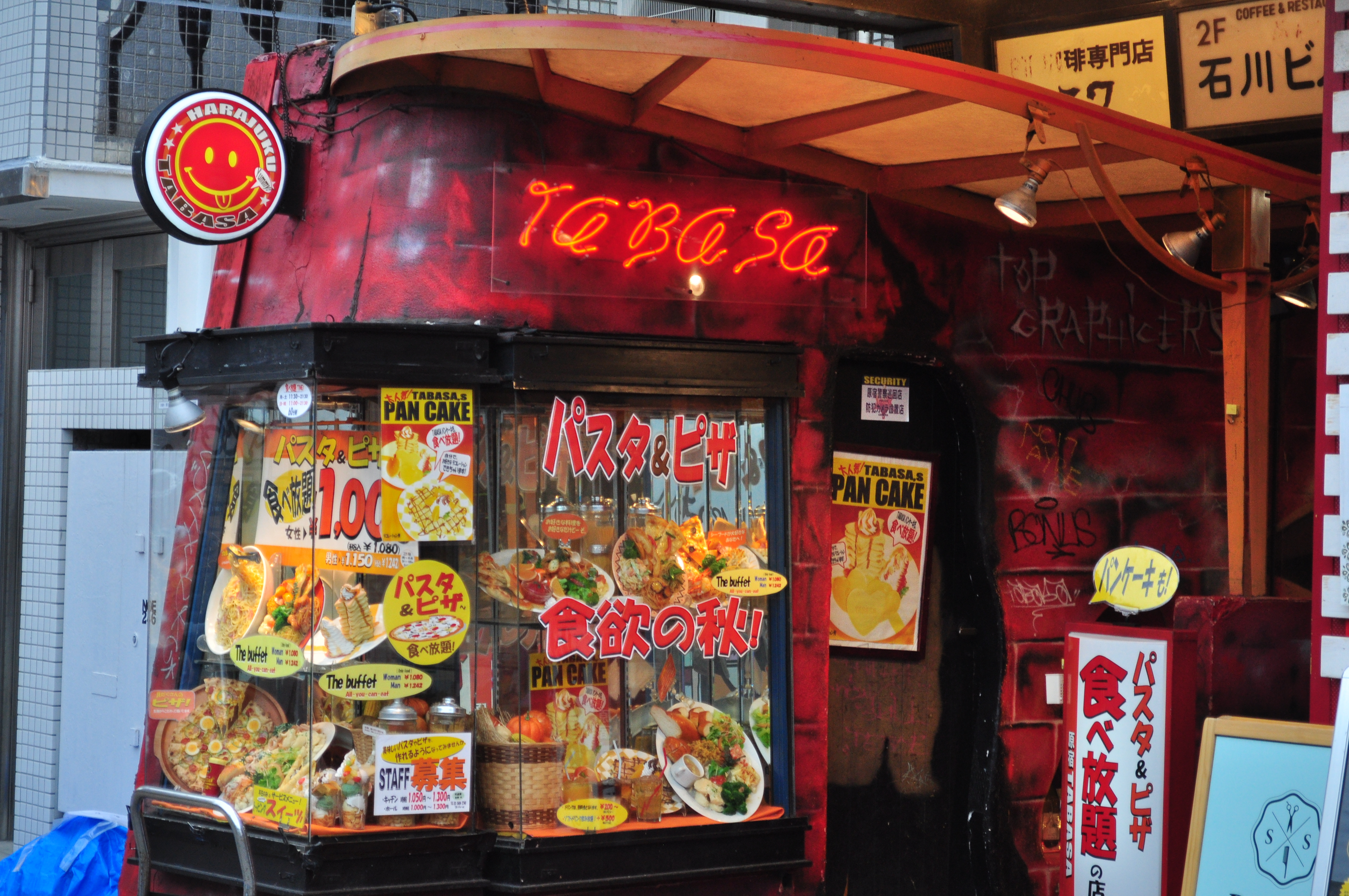
Italian restaurant in Harajuku

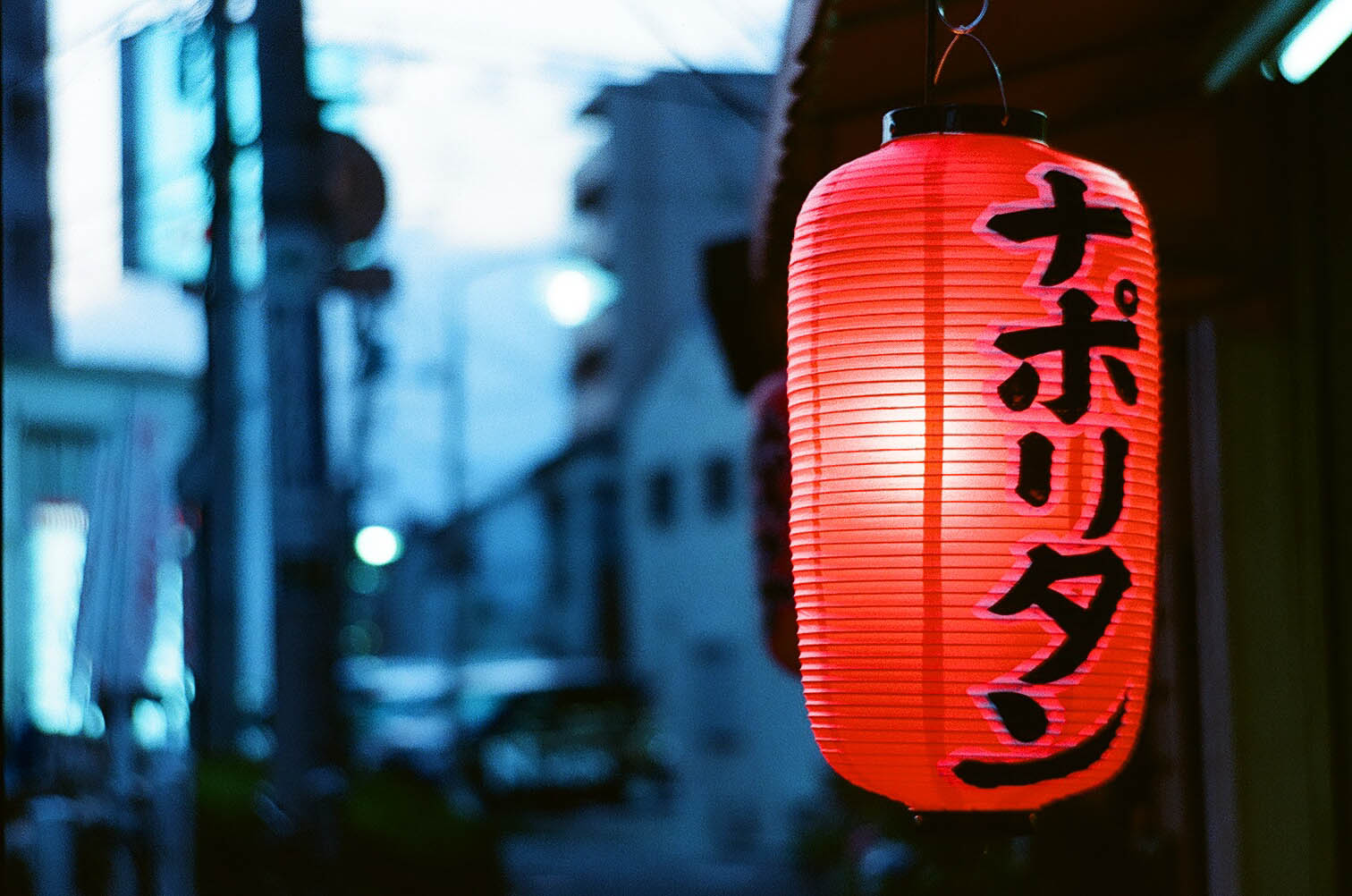
Store lantern advertising Naporitan

Several itameshi chains operate in Japan. A well-known one is the low-cost Saizeriya, which at the end of 2021 operated over 1,500 outlets in Japan and several hundred more overseas. Like many foods in Japan, itameshi can be found at stores near train stations and hotels.

Other restaurants include:

- Capricciosa
- Friend
- Italian Tomato
- Jolly-Pasta
- Mikazuki
- PIETRO
- Saizeriya
- Segafredo Zanetti

== Overseas popularity ==
The popularity of this specific fusion food has taken off in the United States with many different cook books and videos highlighting these dishes gaining popularity online. This popularity has even led to the opening of restaurants specifically dealing in Itameshi within the country.

== Gallery ==
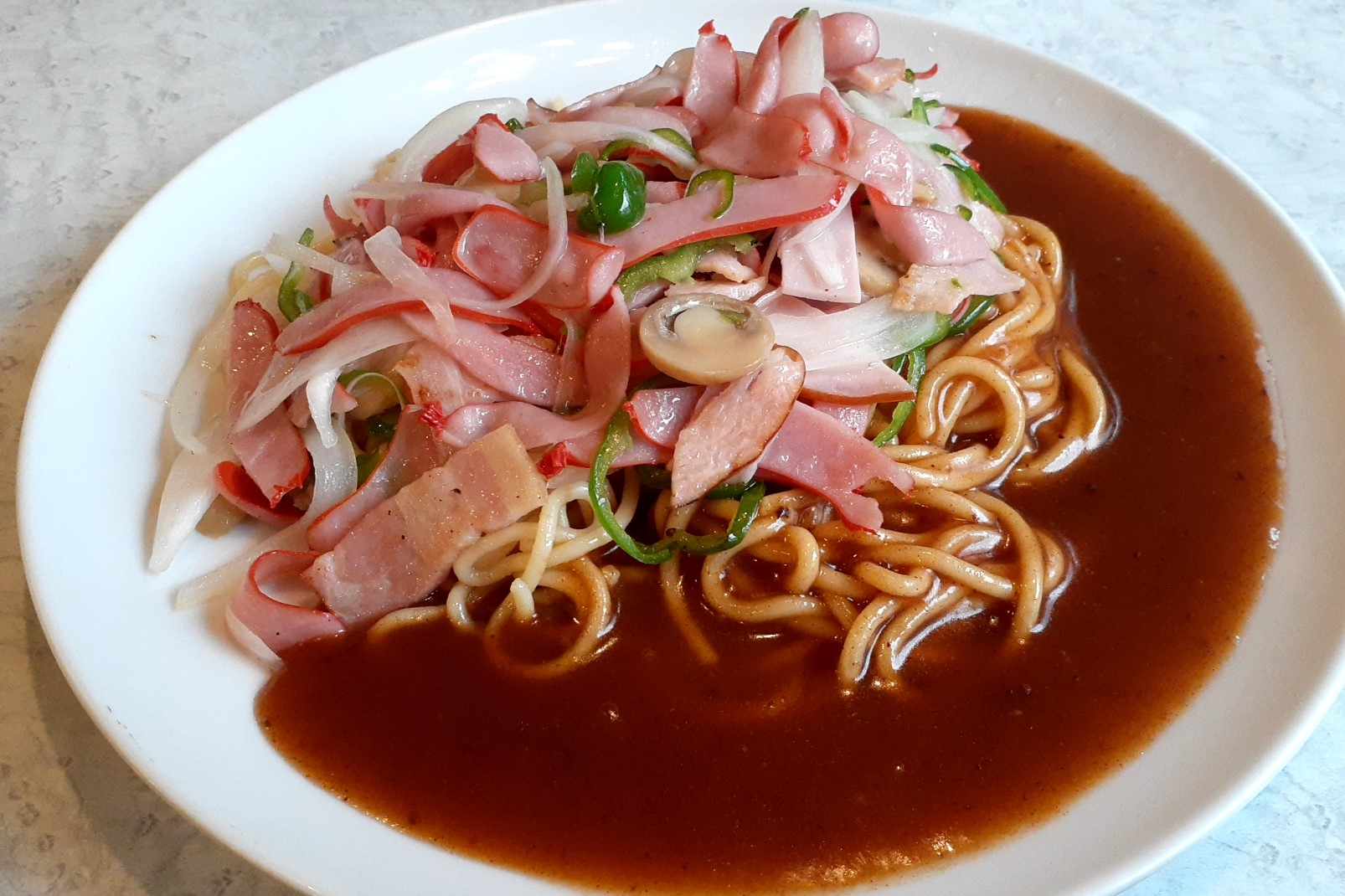
Ankake spaghetti, served with spicy, extra thick sauce

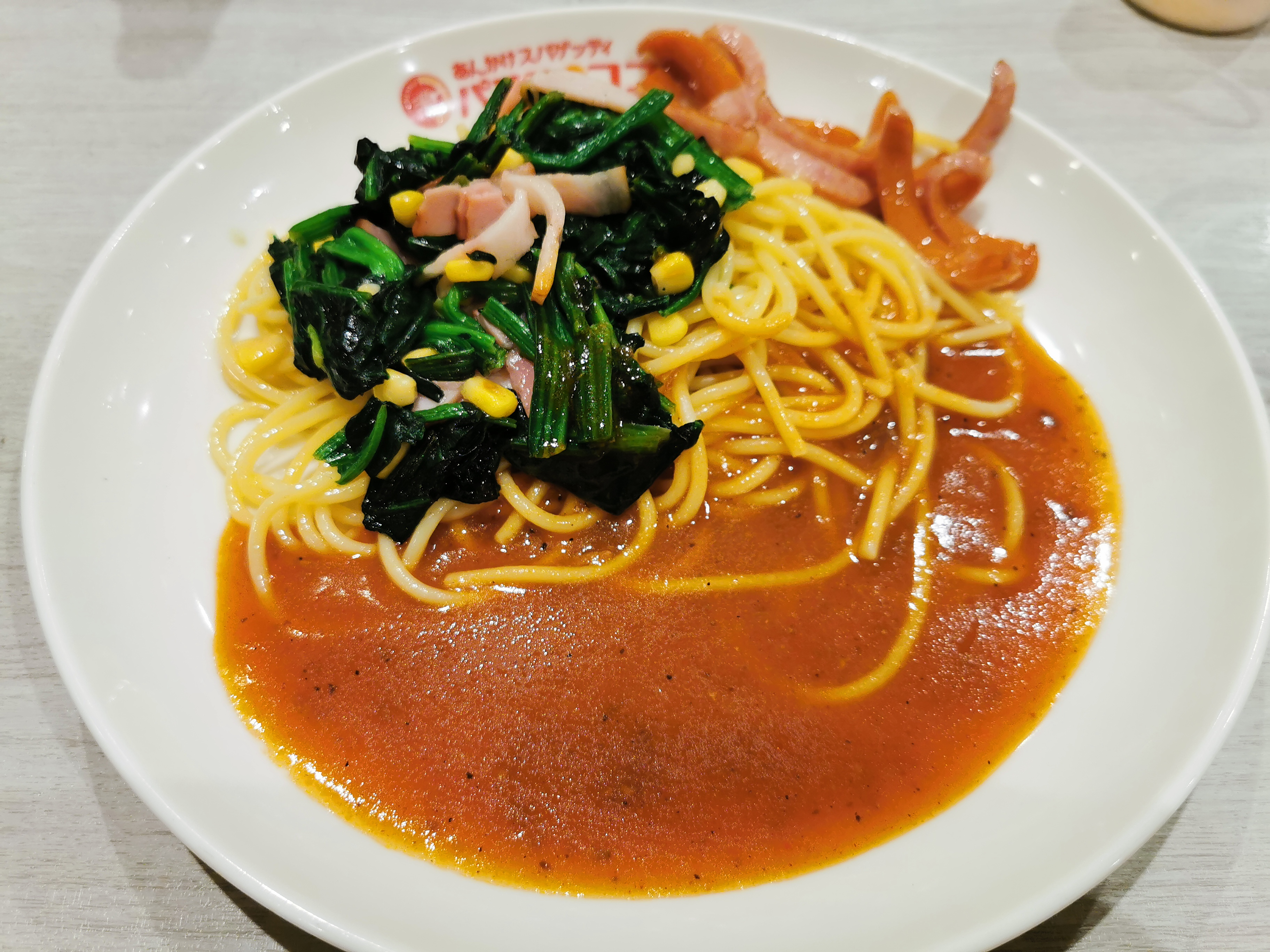
Ankake spaghetti

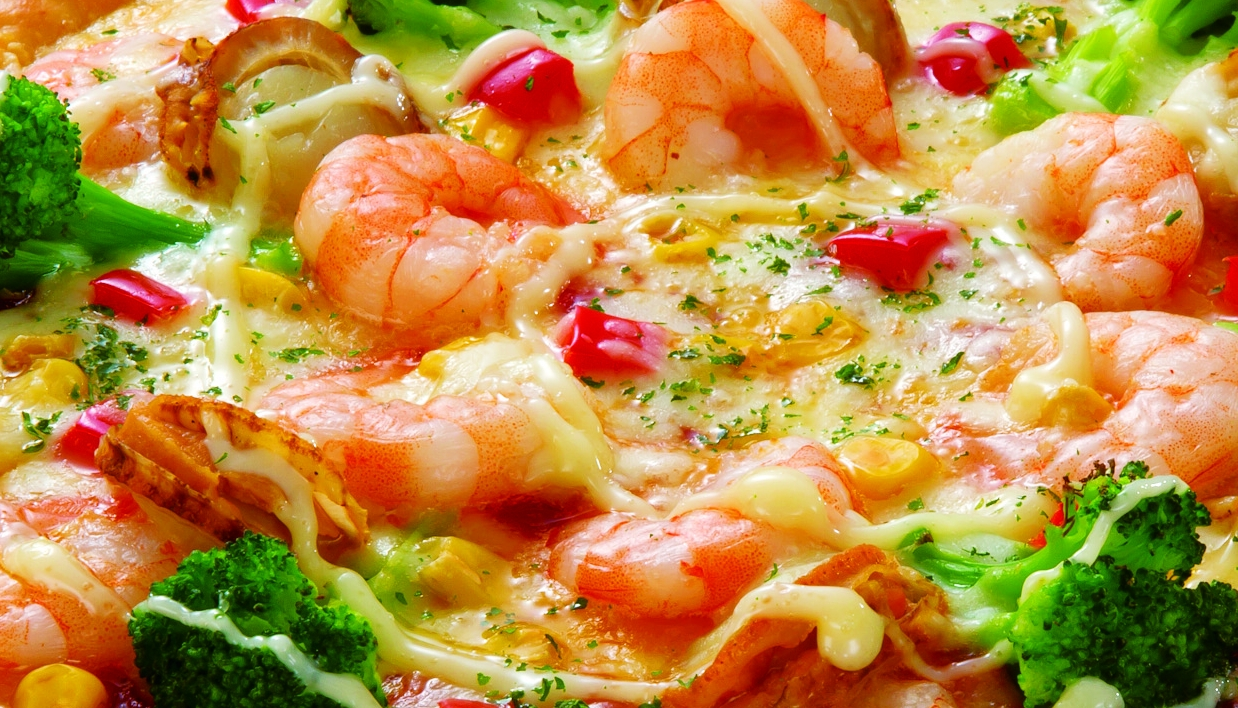
Pizza with shrimp and broccoli

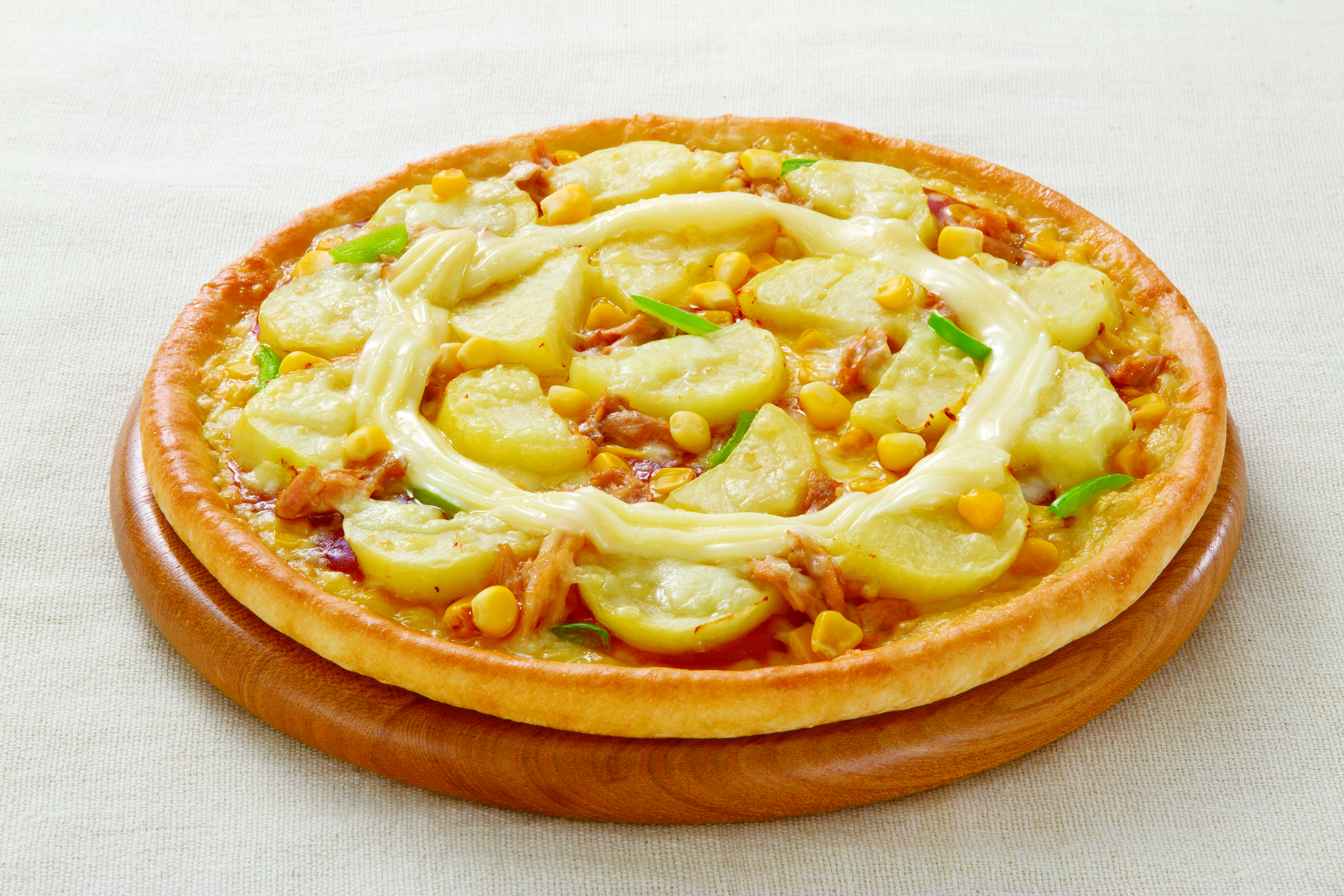
Pizza with Japanese mayonnaise

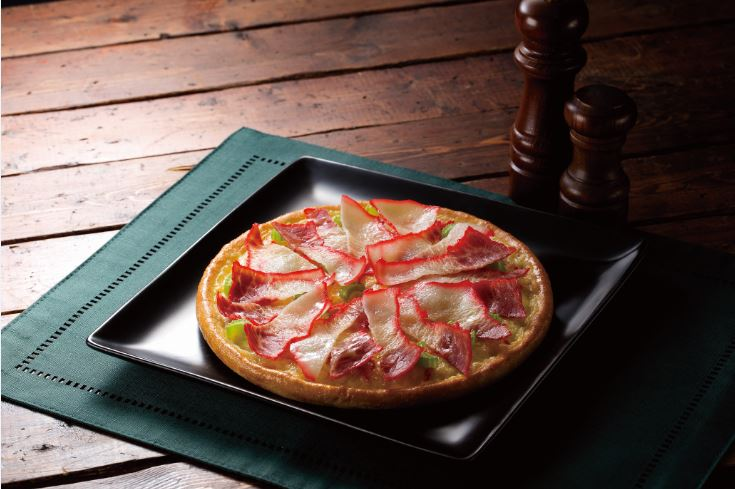
Pizza with whale bacon

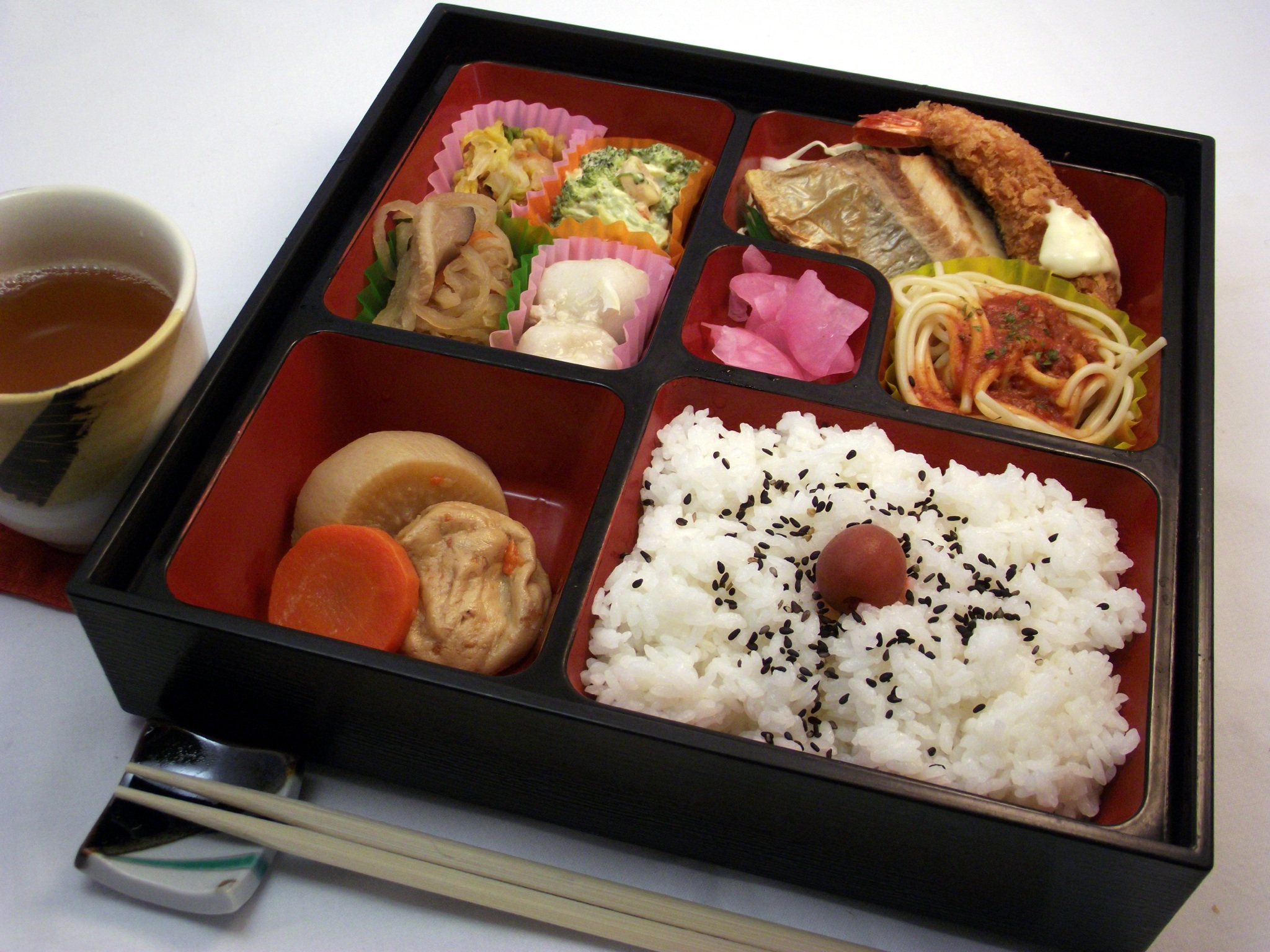
Spaghetti in a bento box

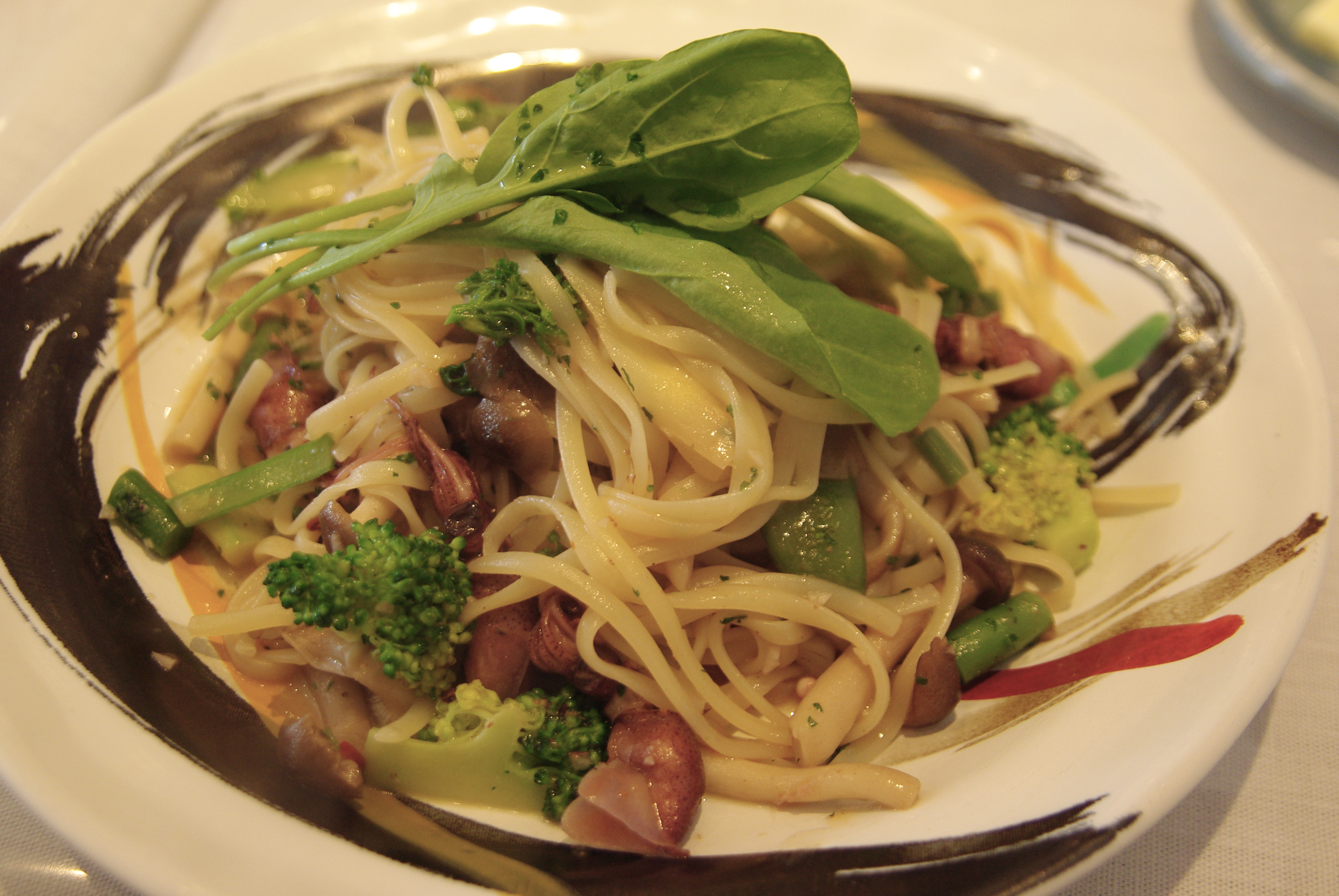
Spaghetti with firefly squid

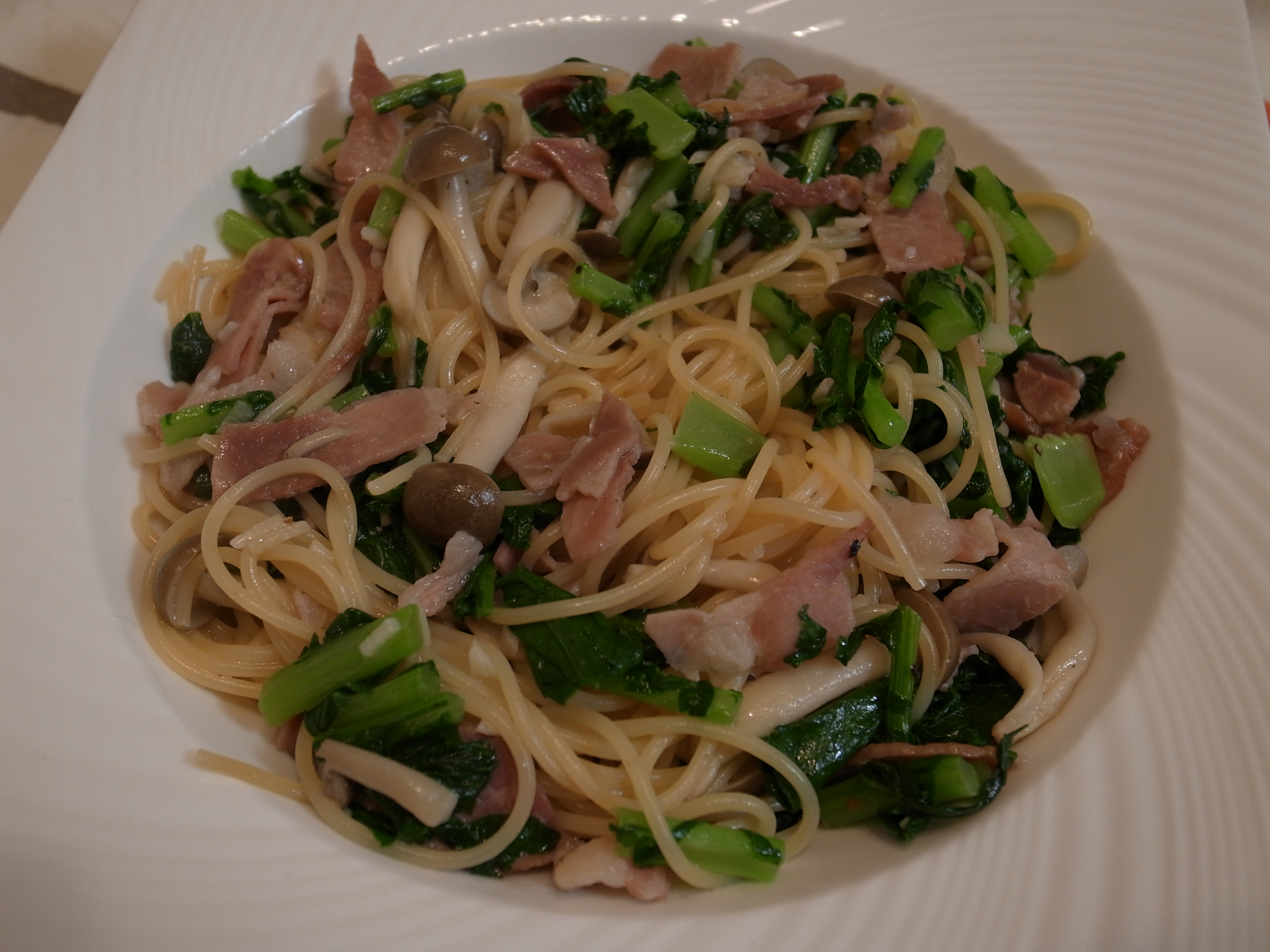
Spaghetti with shimeji mushrooms

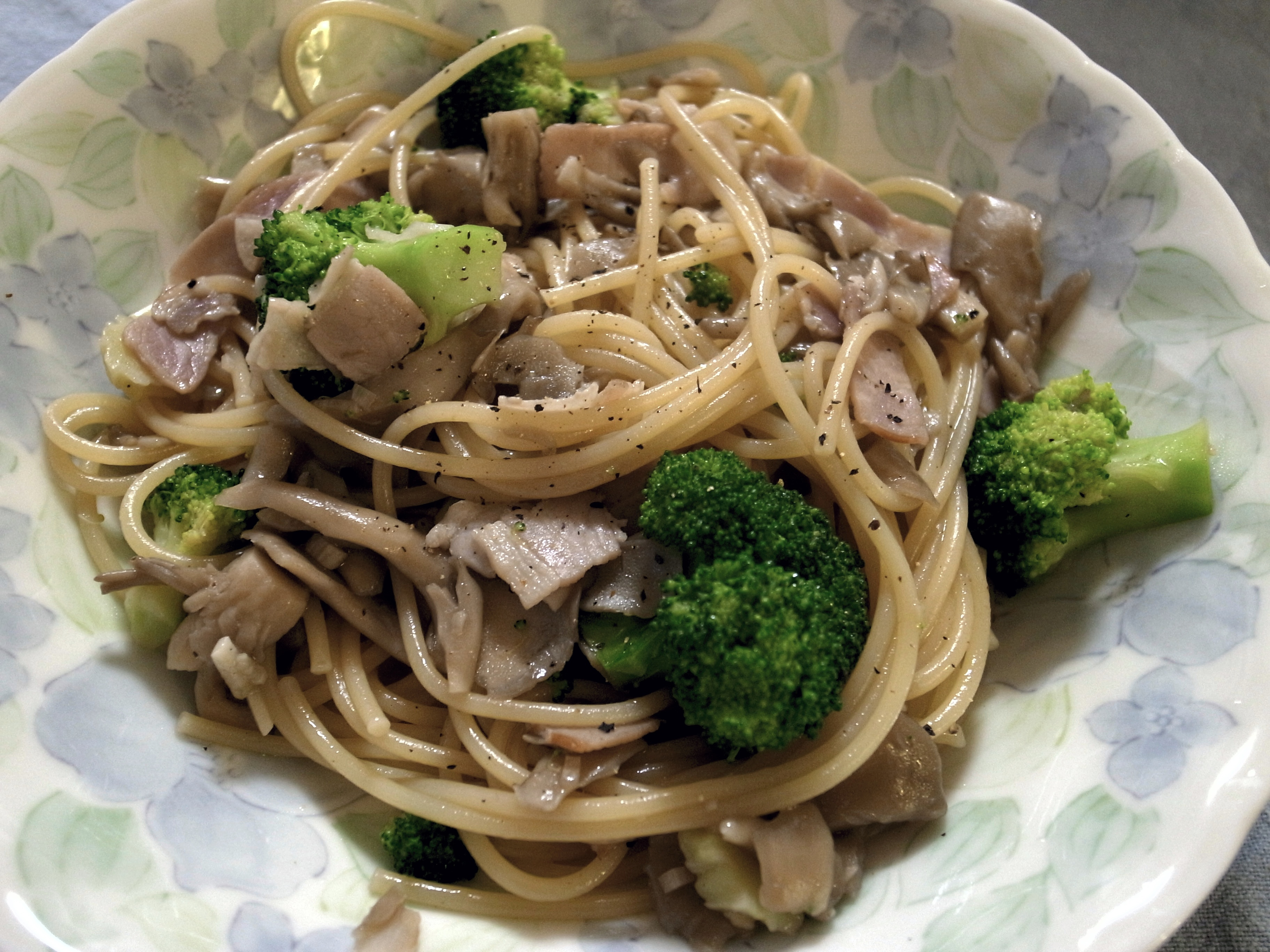
Spaghetti with maitake mushrooms

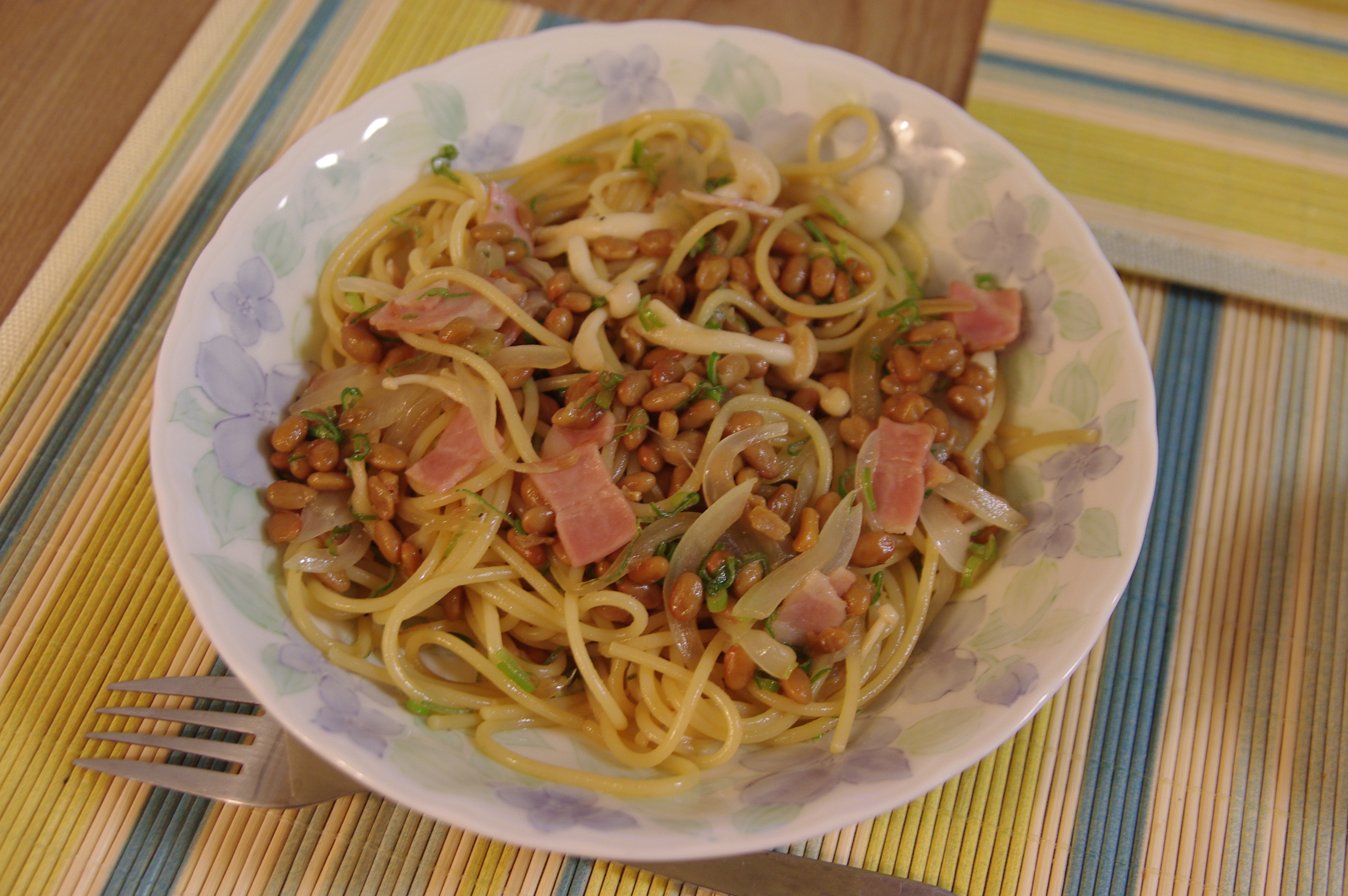
Spaghetti with nattō

== See also ==
- Naporitan
- Yōshoku
- Nikkei cuisine
- Korean-Mexican fusion
