= Naporitan =

Japanese pasta dish

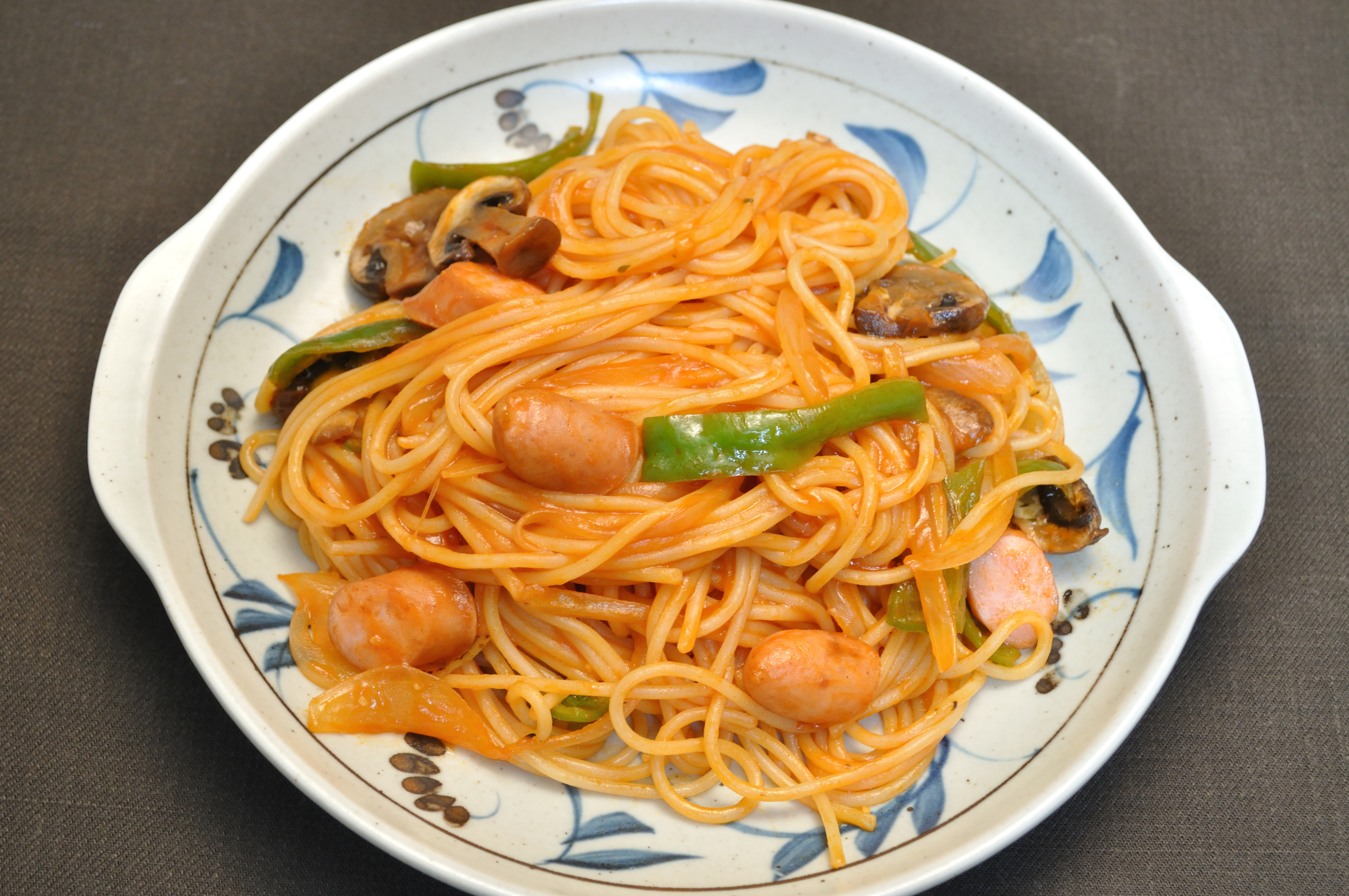
- Naporitan spaghetti with sausage, bell peppers, and mushrooms
- Place of origin: Japan
- Main ingredients: spaghetti, ketchup
- Ingredients generally used: bell pepper, mushrooms, onions, sausage, bacon

Naporitan or Napolitan (Japanese: ナポリタン) is a popular Japanese itameshi pasta dish. The dish consists of soft-cooked spaghetti, tomato ketchup, onion, button mushrooms, green peppers, sausage, bacon and optionally Tabasco sauce. Naporitan is claimed to be from Yokohama.

== Origin ==
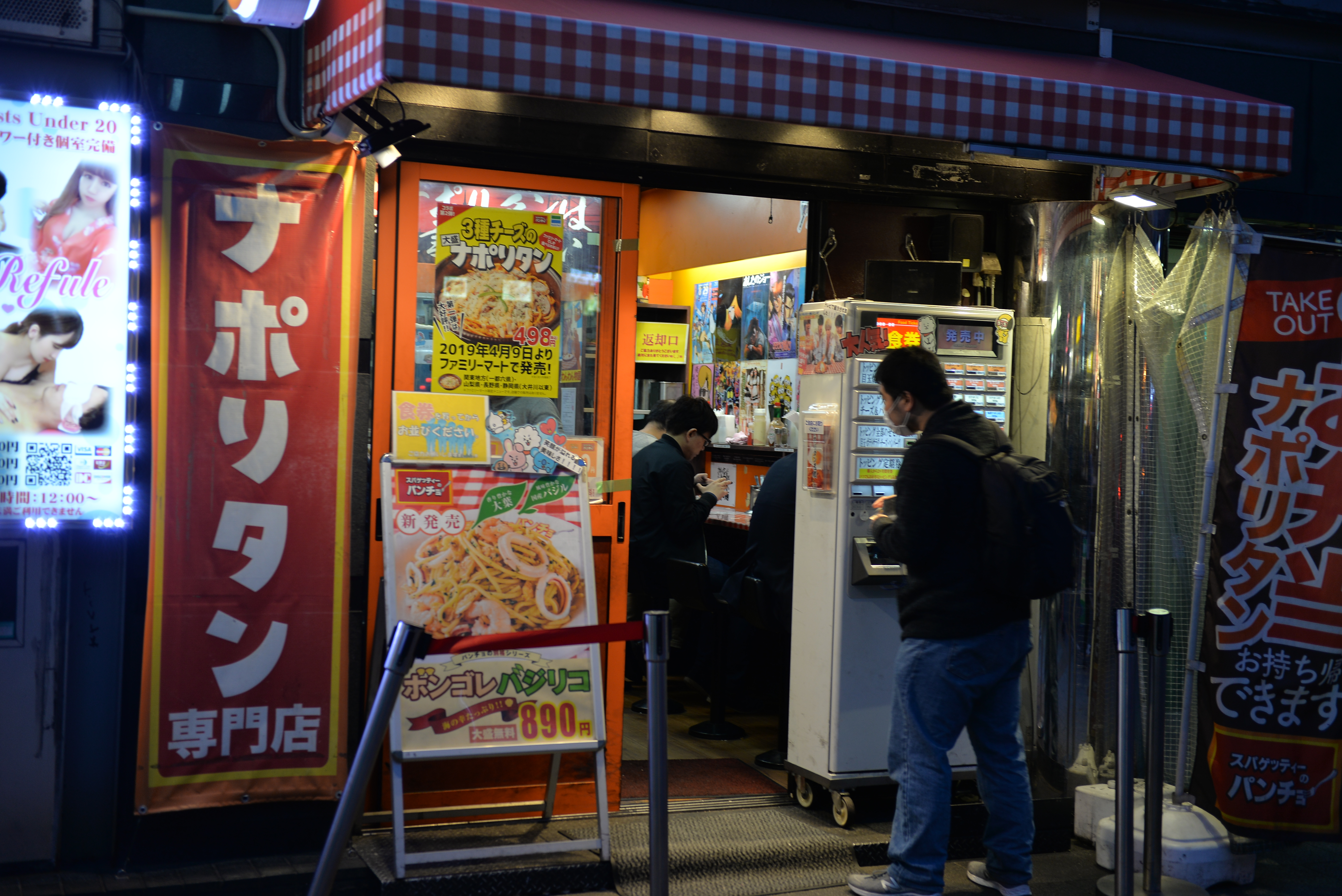
A naporitan shop in Akihabara

Naporitan was created by Shigetada Irie (入江茂忠), the chef of the Hotel New Grand in Yokohama, for general Douglas MacArthur. Because available ingredients were limited after World War II, he had to use what was on hand for the general, who lived at the hotel with his wife.

== Name ==
The chef named the dish after Naples, Italy (hence "Napoli"). Phonetically, the Japanese language does not distinguish R and L as separate sounds, and so uses the same katakana characters to represent R and L sounds of Western alphabets. Thus when converting katakana back into English, based solely on the Japanese spelling in the English alphabet is ambiguous and can vary. The spelling Naporitan is derived from the usual romanization of Japanese, while the spelling Napolitan takes the origin of the name into account. This could be roughly translated as Neapolitan.

== Gallery ==
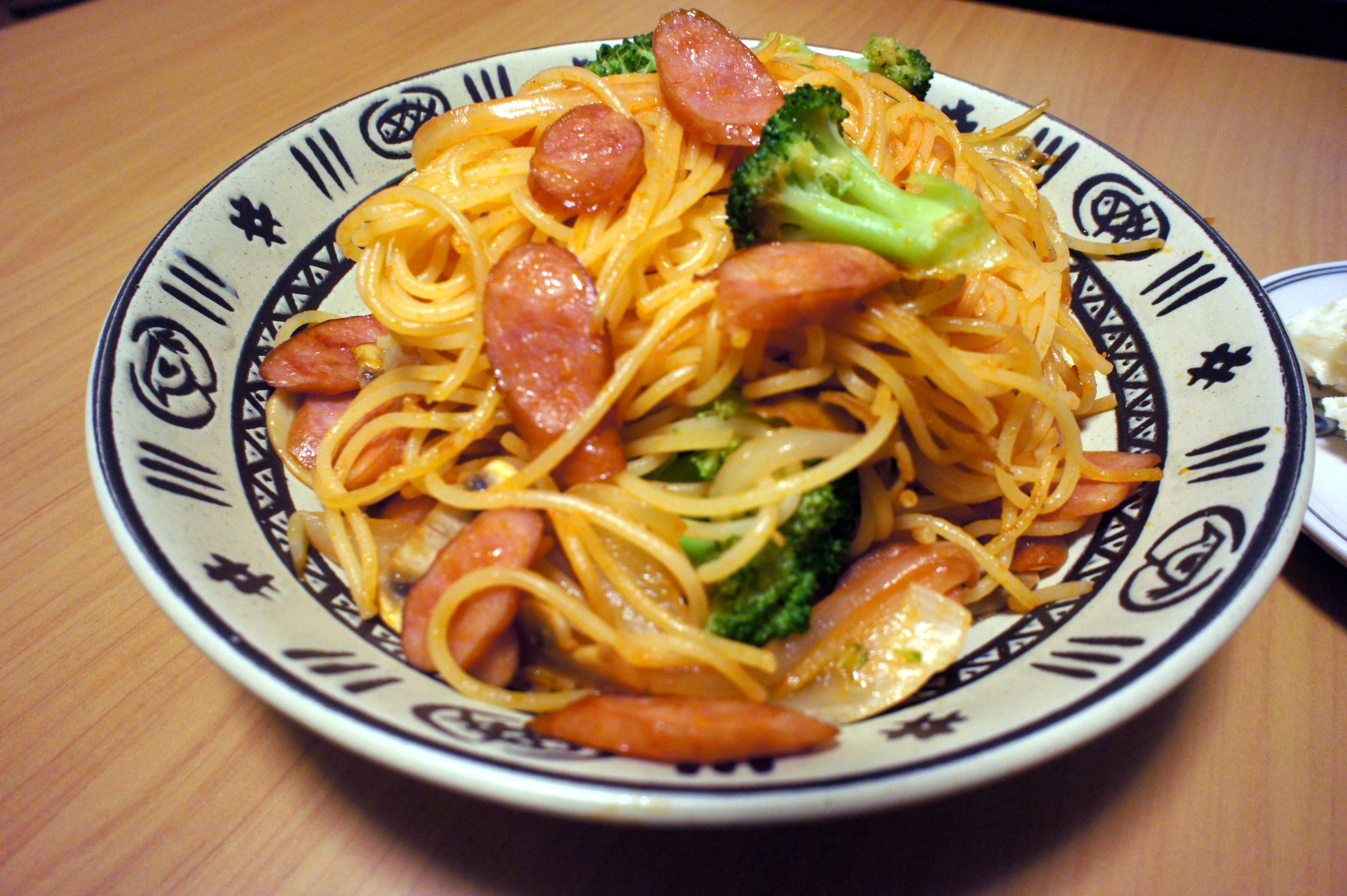
With sausage and broccoli

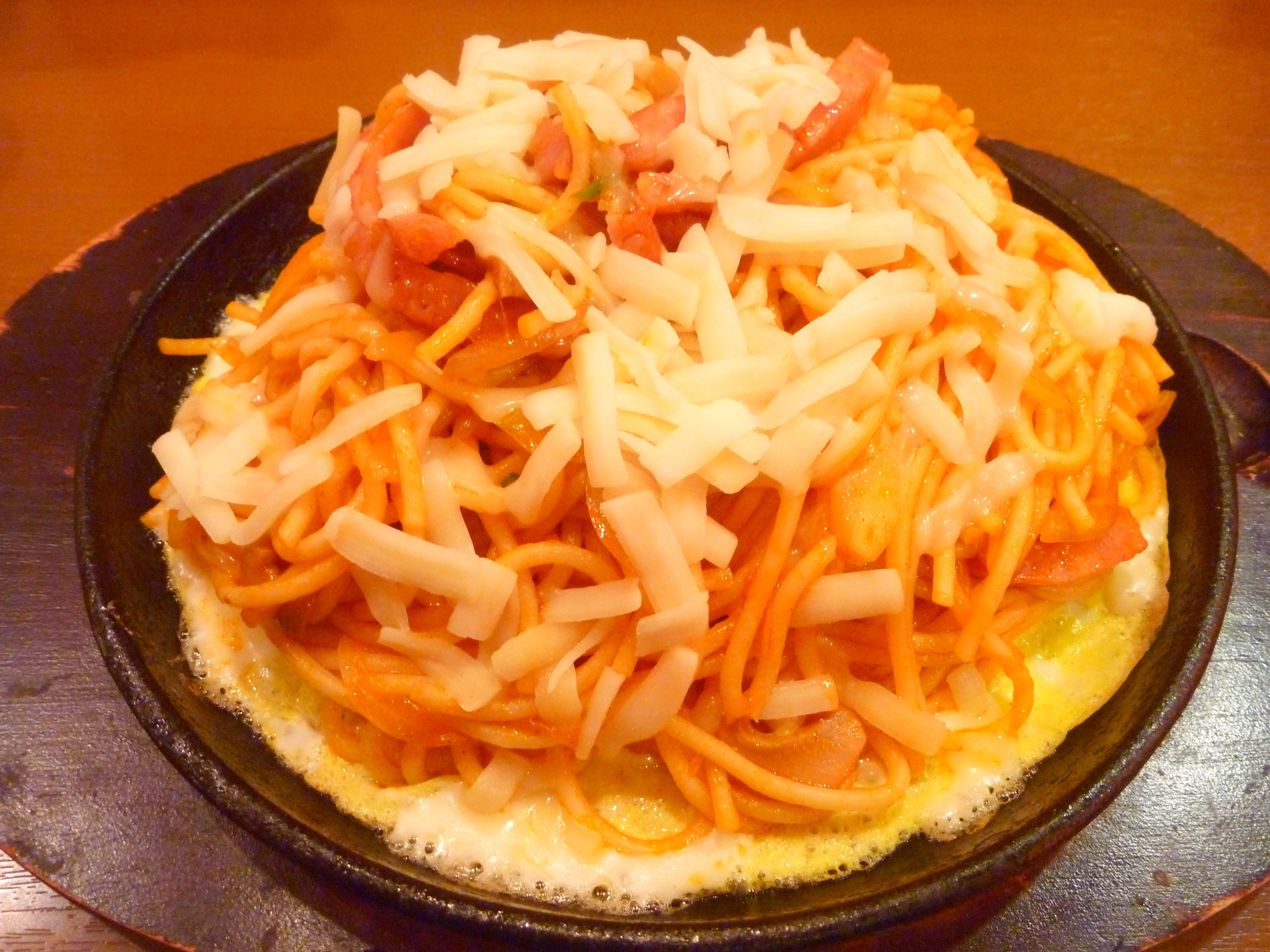
With cheese

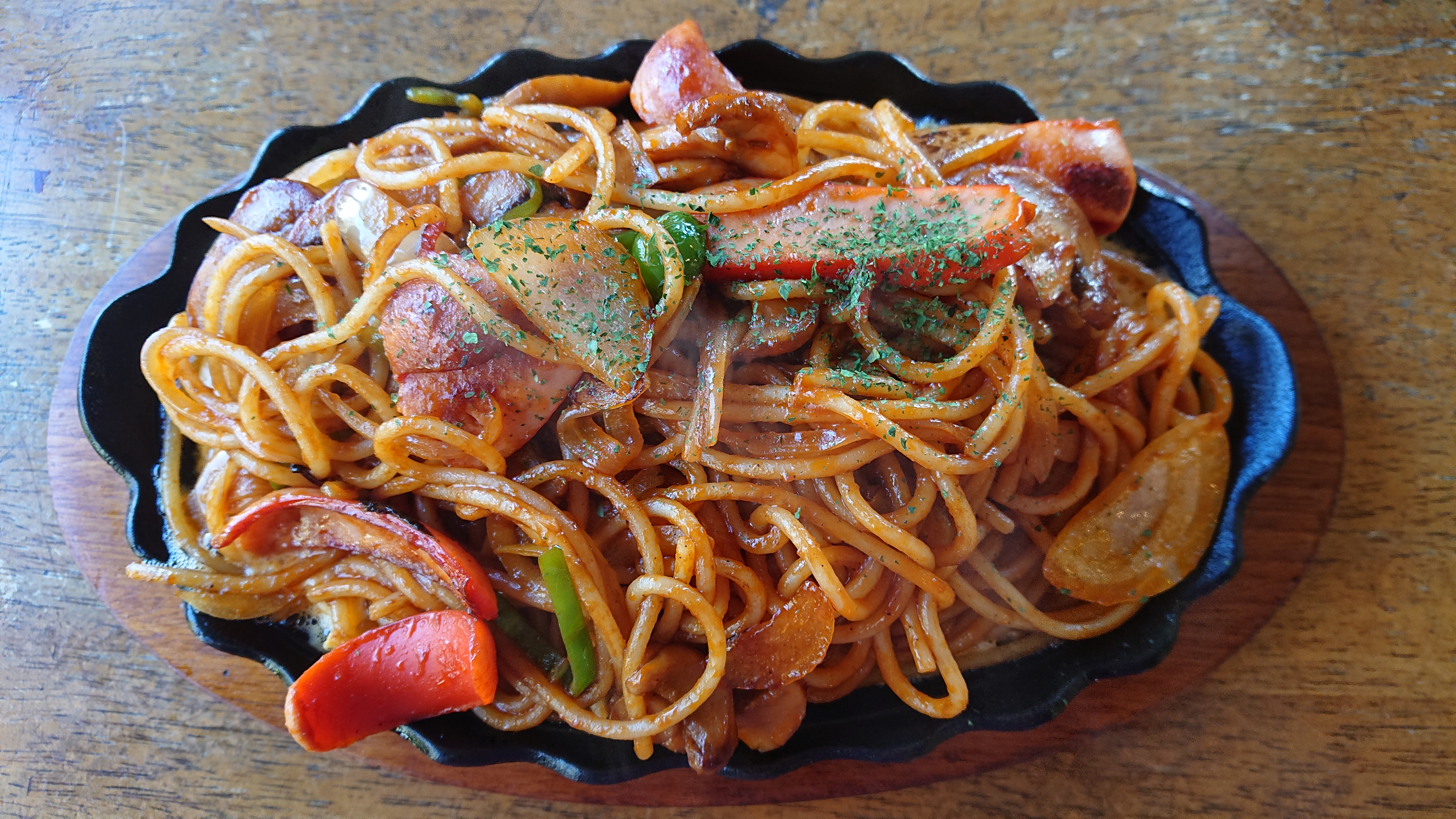
With bell peppers

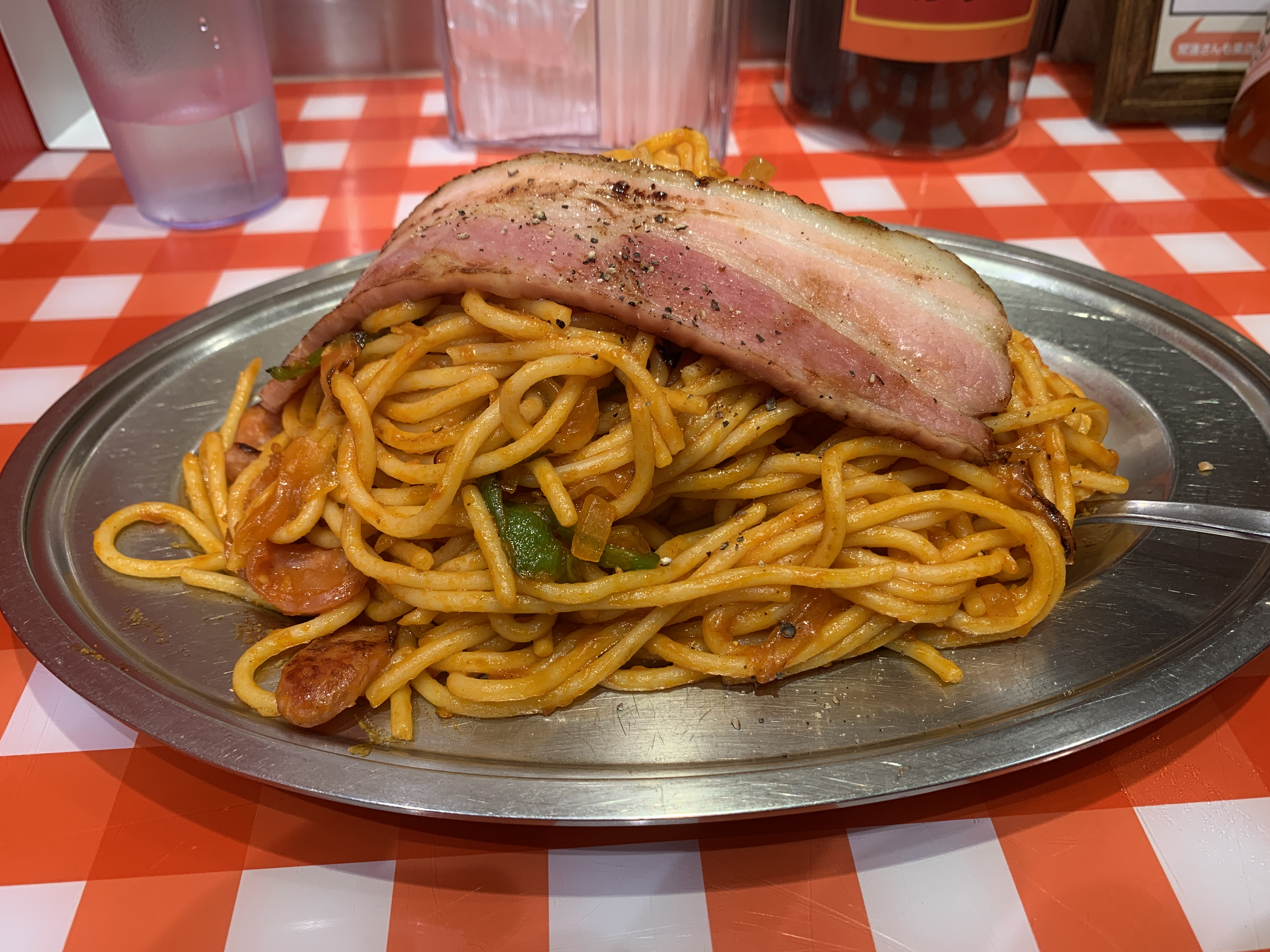
With bacon

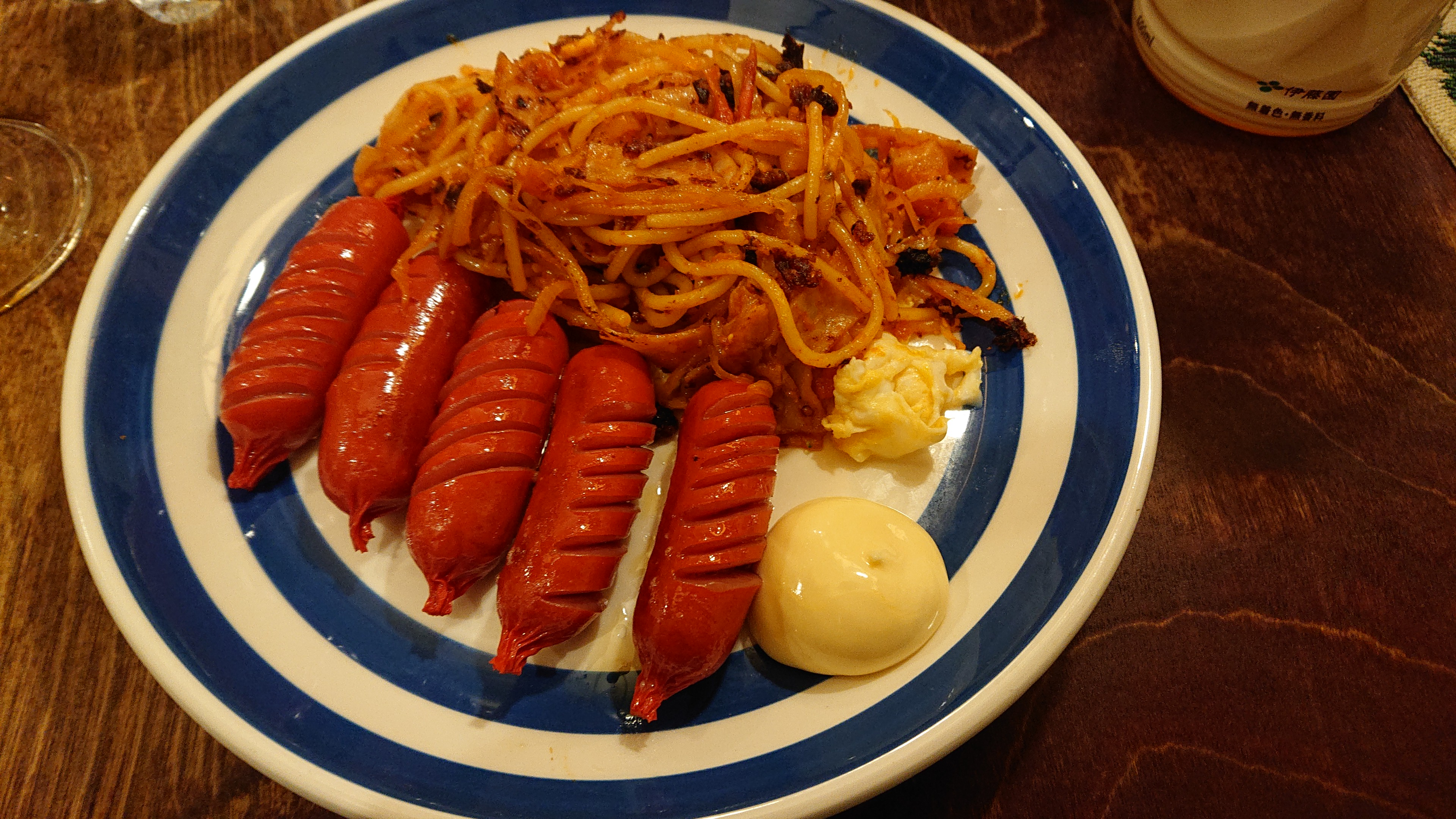

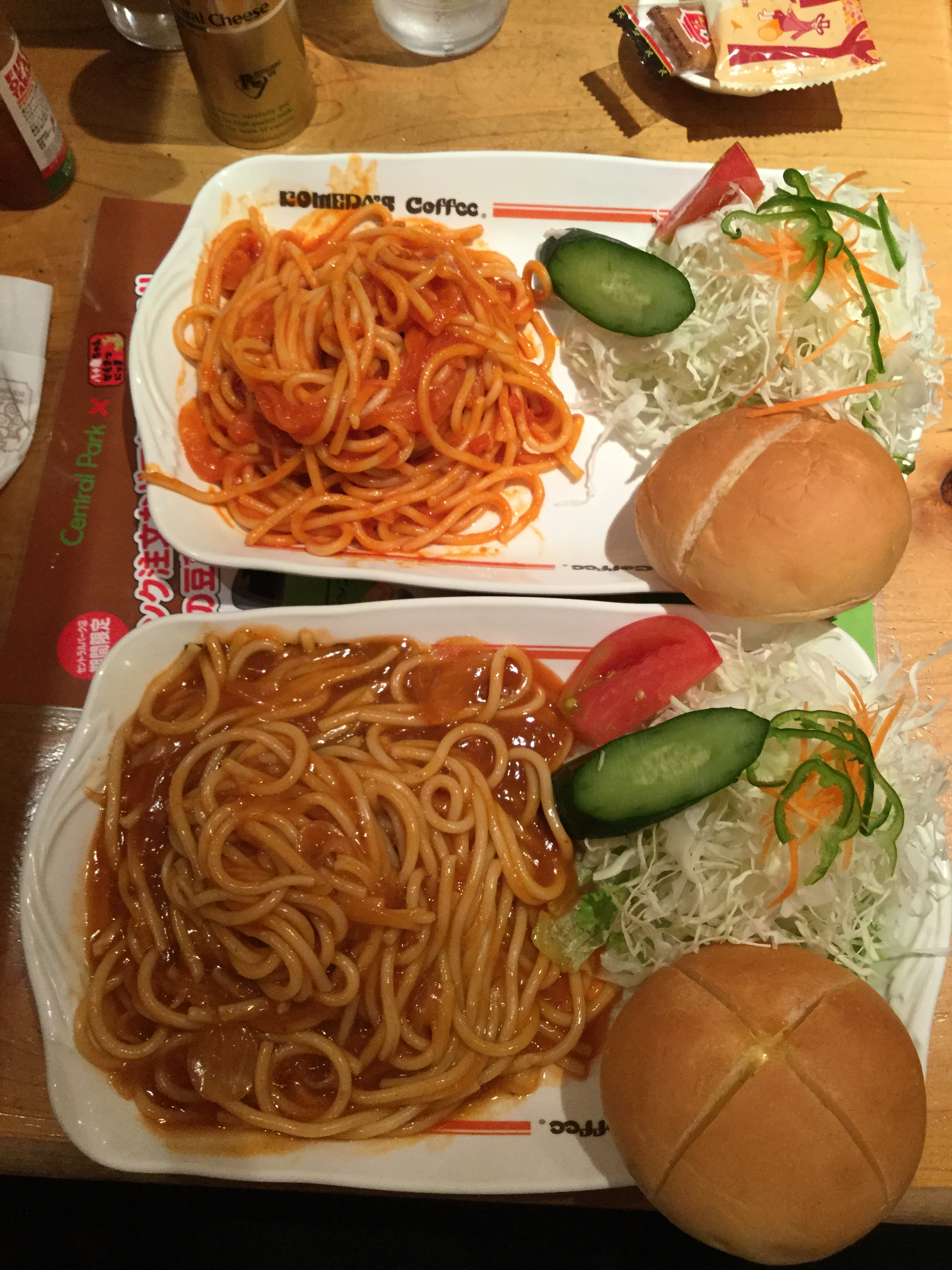

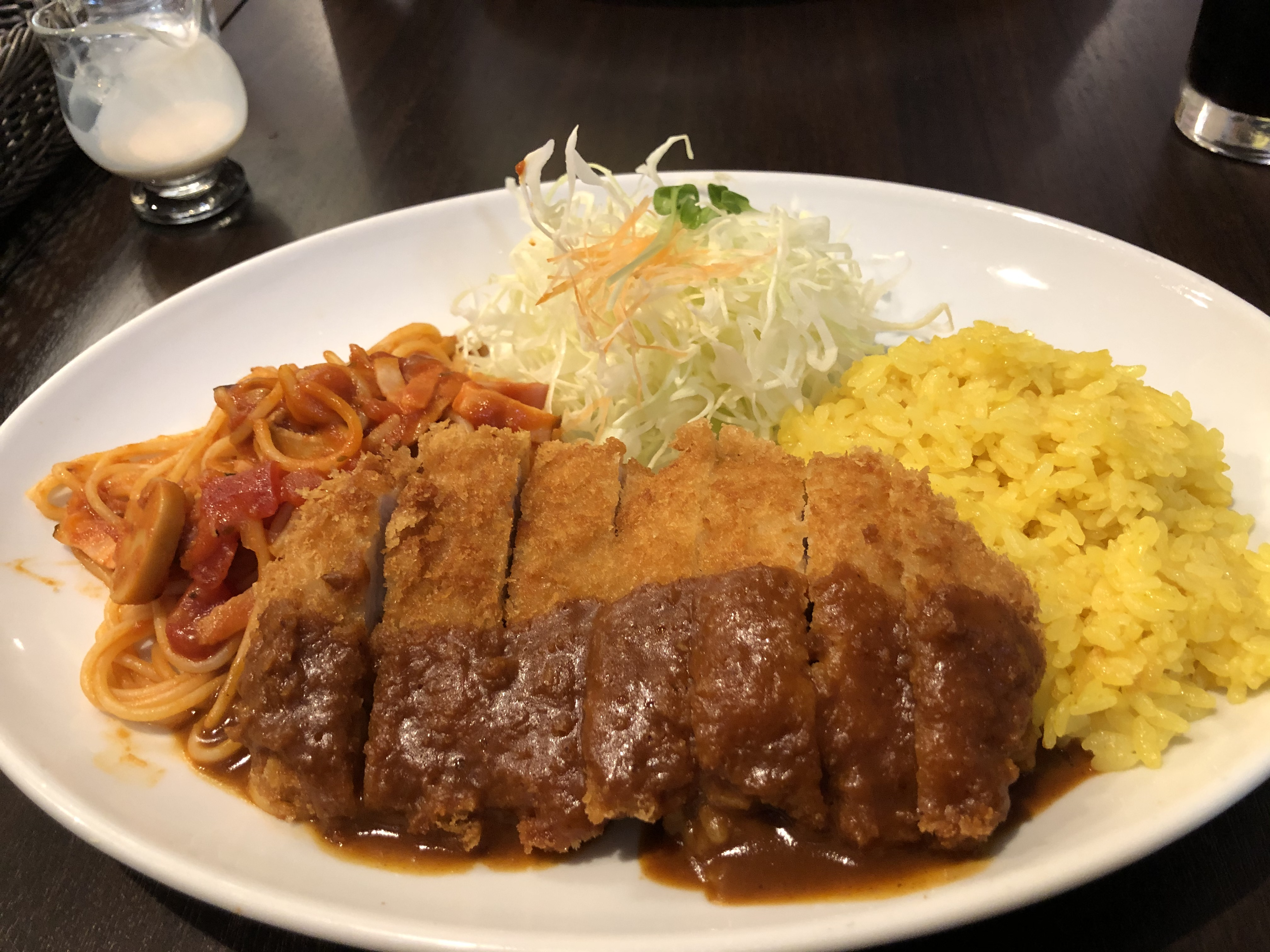
"Toruko rice", tonkatsu, pilaf, and Naporitan.

== See also ==
- Yōshoku
- Itameshi
- List of pasta dishes
- Neapolitan ragù
- Filipino spaghetti, a similar pasta dish from Philippines
