= Hotel New Grand =

Hotel in Yokohama, Kanagawa, Japan

Coordinates: 35.444773°N 139.649593°E

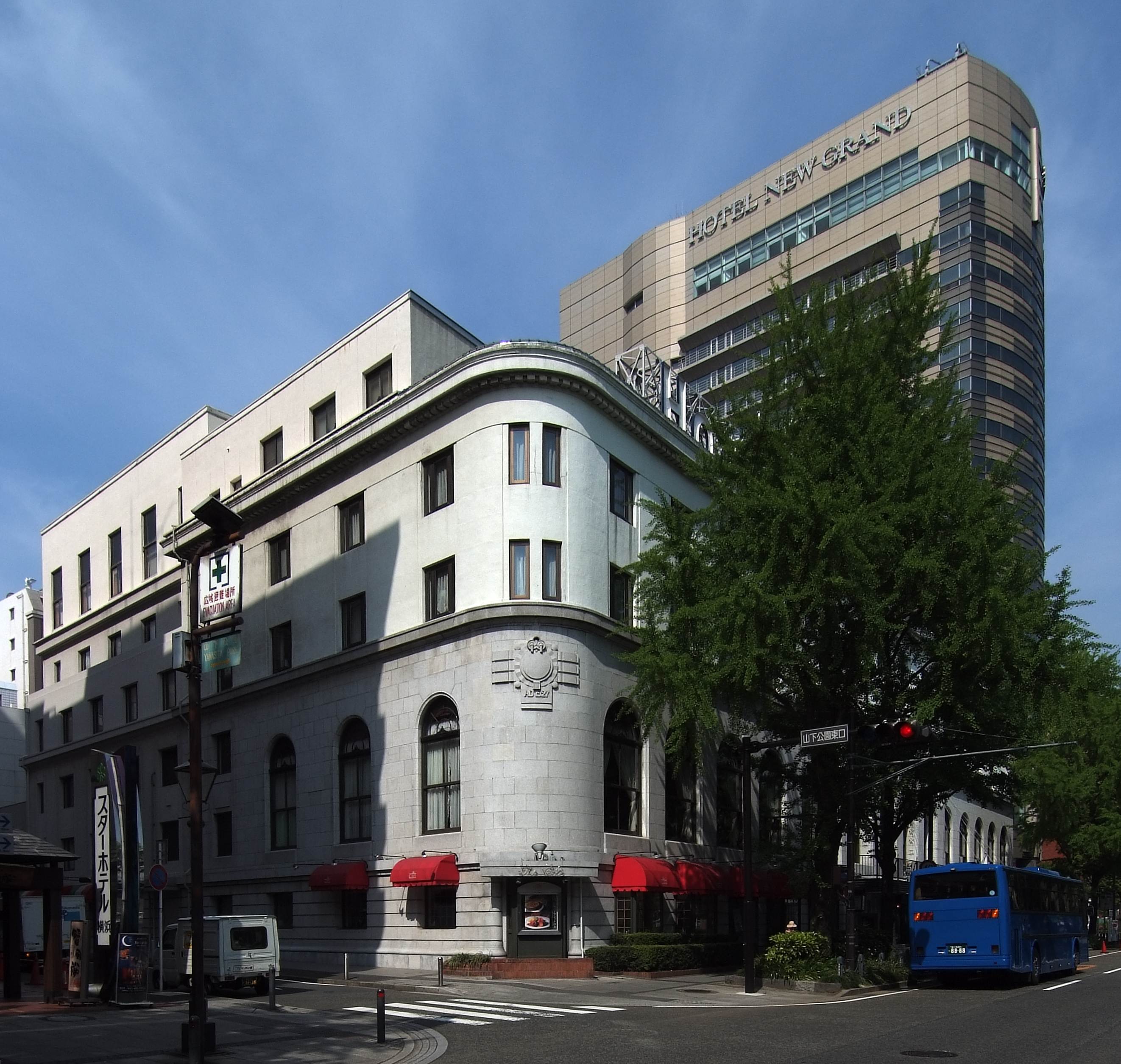
- Hotel New Grand, showing original 1927 wing and 1991 tower behind
- Interactive map of the Hotel New Grand area

General information
- Location: Yokohama, Japan
- Opening: 1927

Other information
- Number of rooms: 249

Website
- Official website

The Hotel New Grand (ホテルニューグランド) (JASDAQ: 9720) is a historic hotel in Yokohama, Japan, overlooking Yamashita Park. It opened in 1927, four years after the Great Kantō earthquake devastated much of the city.

The hotel was used as accommodation by American troops during the occupation of Japan following World War II; one of the hotel suites is set aside and maintained just as it was furnished when General Douglas MacArthur stayed there, his first night in Japan during the occupation. The hotel is believed to be the place where the famous yoshoku dish naporitan was invented by a head chef.

In 1991, an eighteen-story tower was built as an expansion of the hotel.

== Gallery ==
Hotel New Grand

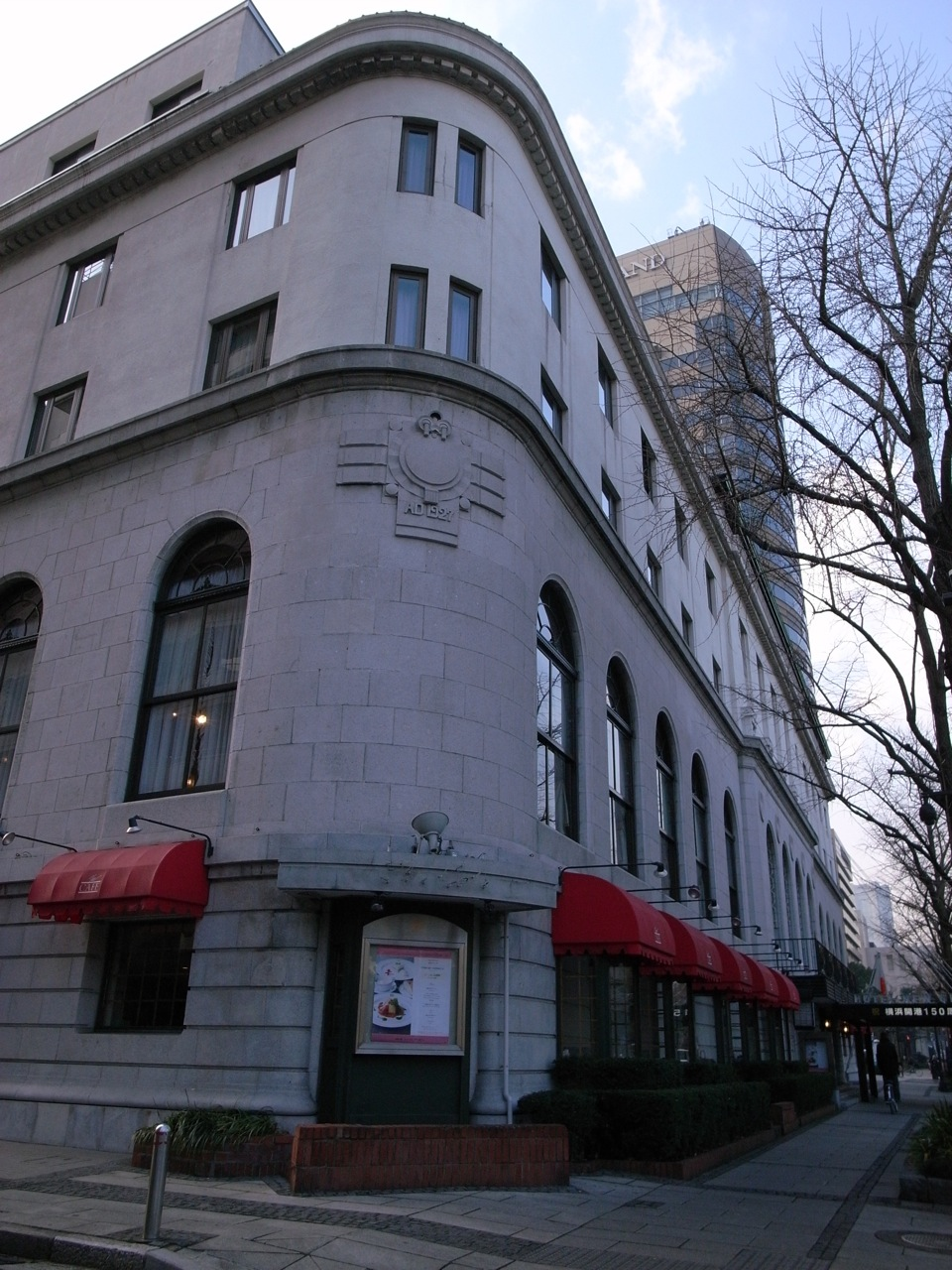
Hotel New Grand

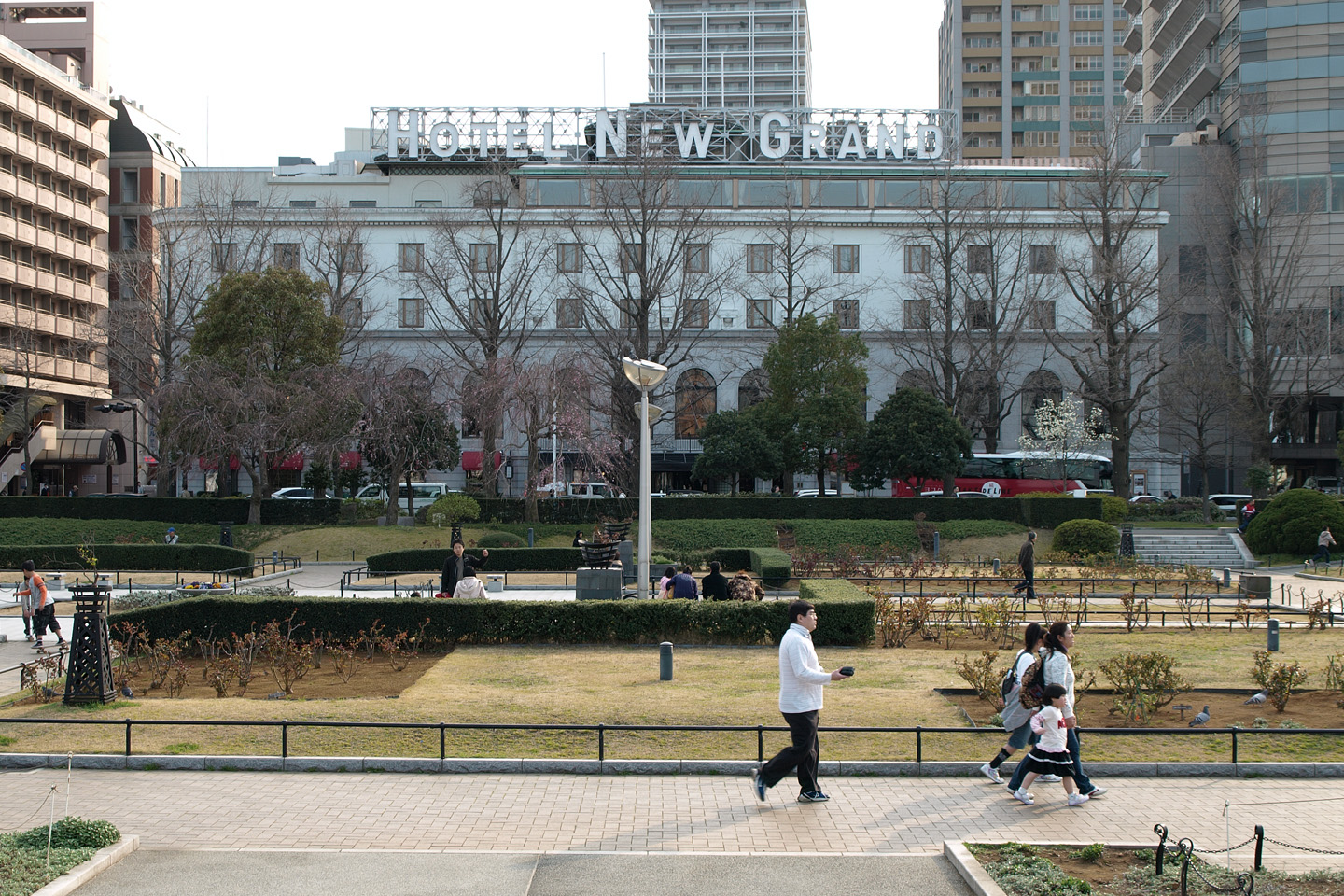
Hotel New Grand main wing

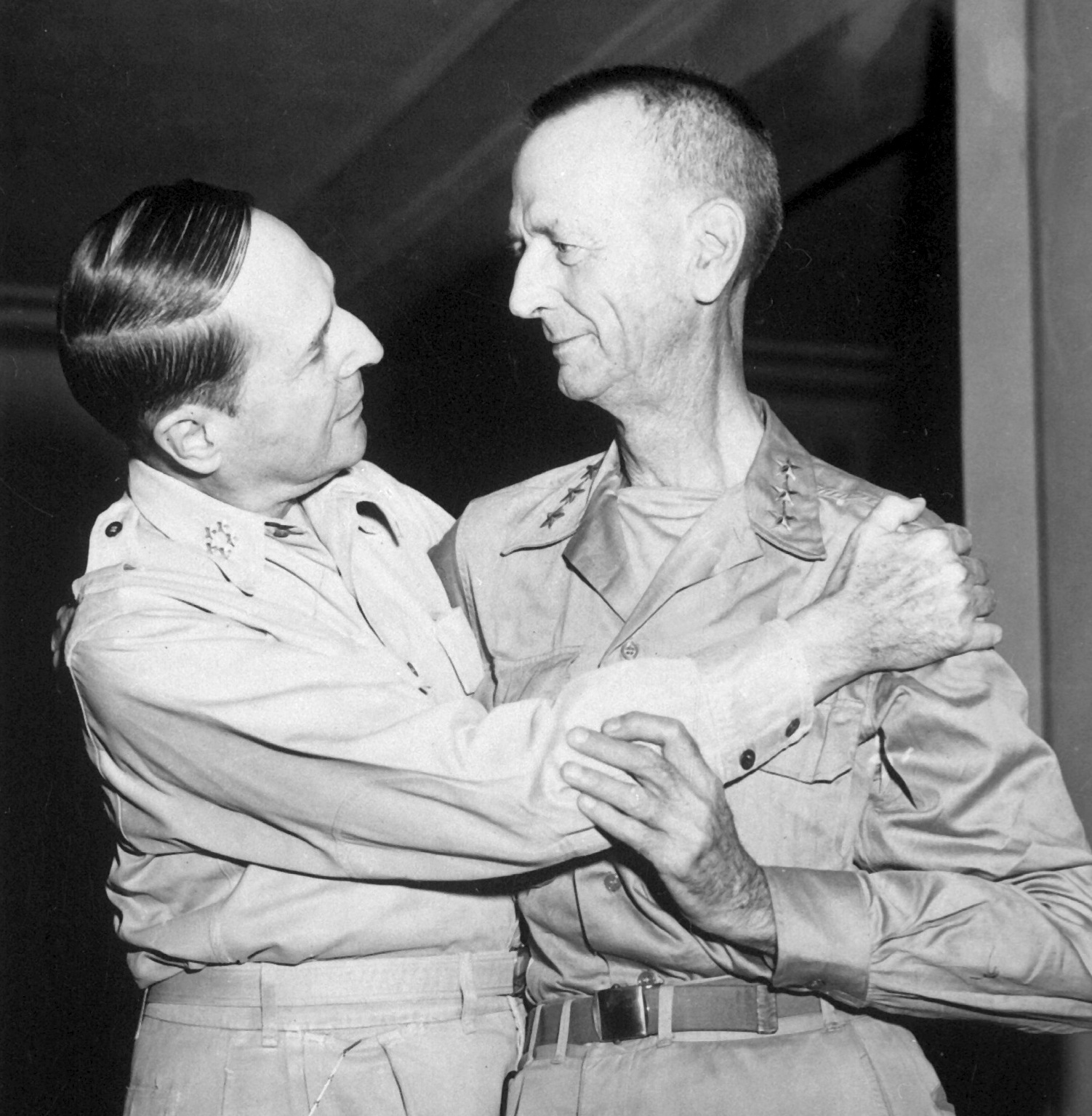
General Douglas MacArthur and Lt. Gen. Jonathan Wainwright at the New Grand Hotel, August 31, 1945.
