= Toruko rice =

Japanese dish

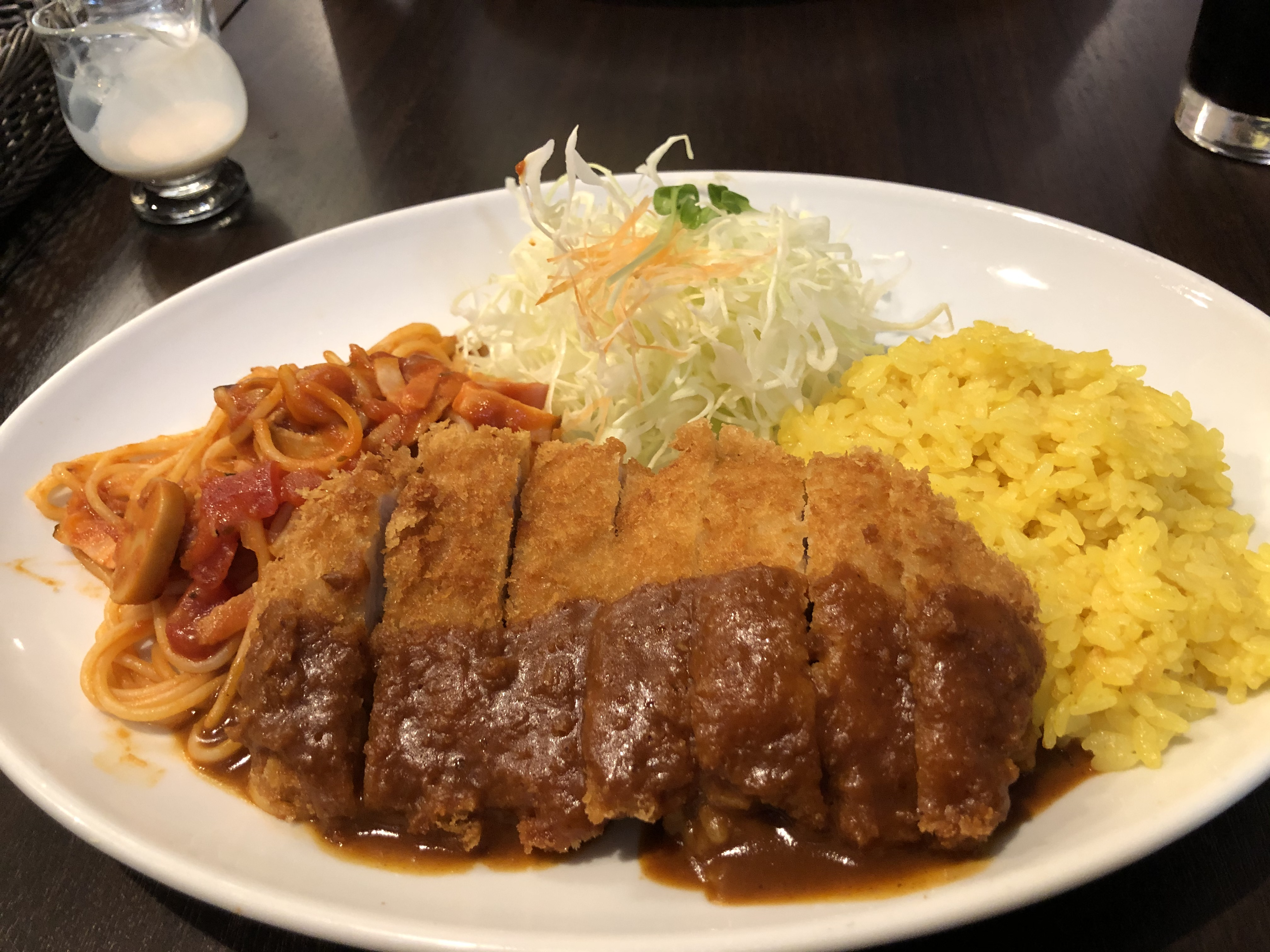
Toruko rice, served with a demi-glace sauce.

Toruko rice (トルコライス, "Turkish rice") is a Japanese dish originating in Nagasaki that consists of pilaf rice, naporitan-style spaghetti and a tonkatsu pork cutlet, with cabbage sometimes being added as a side dish. It is considered part of yōshoku cusine, western-influenced cooking that came to Japan in the late 19th century following the Meiji Restoration.

Despite the name, there is no relation to any dish within Turkish cuisine.

== See also ==
- List of common yōshoku dishes
- Cuisine of Nagasaki
