= Nikkei cuisine =

Japanese-Peruvian fusion cuisine

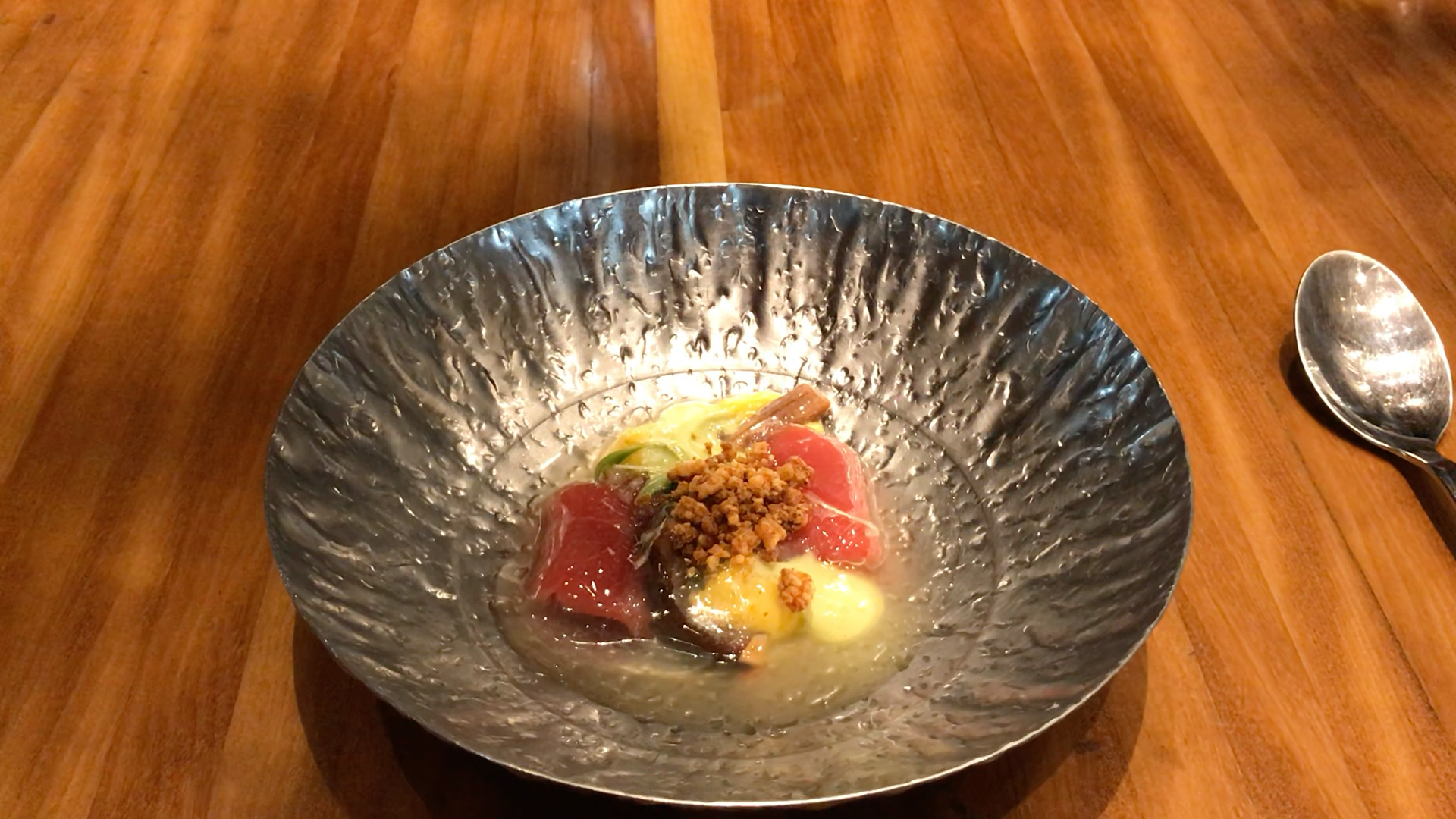
Tiradito at Maido, a nikkei restaurant in Lima

Nikkei cuisine is a type of fusion cuisine that combines Japanese and Peruvian elements. Nikkei is the word used to describe immigrants of Japanese origin in Peru.

== History ==
The Japanese first began their journey through Peru in 1889.

== Characteristics ==
Nikkei food is characterized by its use of the wide variety of ingredients available to Peru. In 1980, this type of food became recognized and since then has been seen as a fusion of Japanese and Peruvian ingredients. Peruvian influences include some basic ingredients such as rocoto, which gives the spicy flavor, yellow chili peppers and limes. On the other hand, the Japanese side of the fusion can be seen in the introduction of vegetable crops and especially rice in the Peruvian land. Not only did they combine products from both cultures, but the Japanese would also use Peruvian foods to make traditional dishes from their homeland. An example of this is the use of yucca for the preparation of mochi, which will give rise to yucamochi, a classic dish of this fusion cuisine.

== See also ==
- Chifa
- Itameshi
- Korean-Mexican fusion
