= Saizeriya =

Japanese family-style yōshoku restaurant chain

Saizeriya Co., Ltd. 株式会社サイゼリヤ
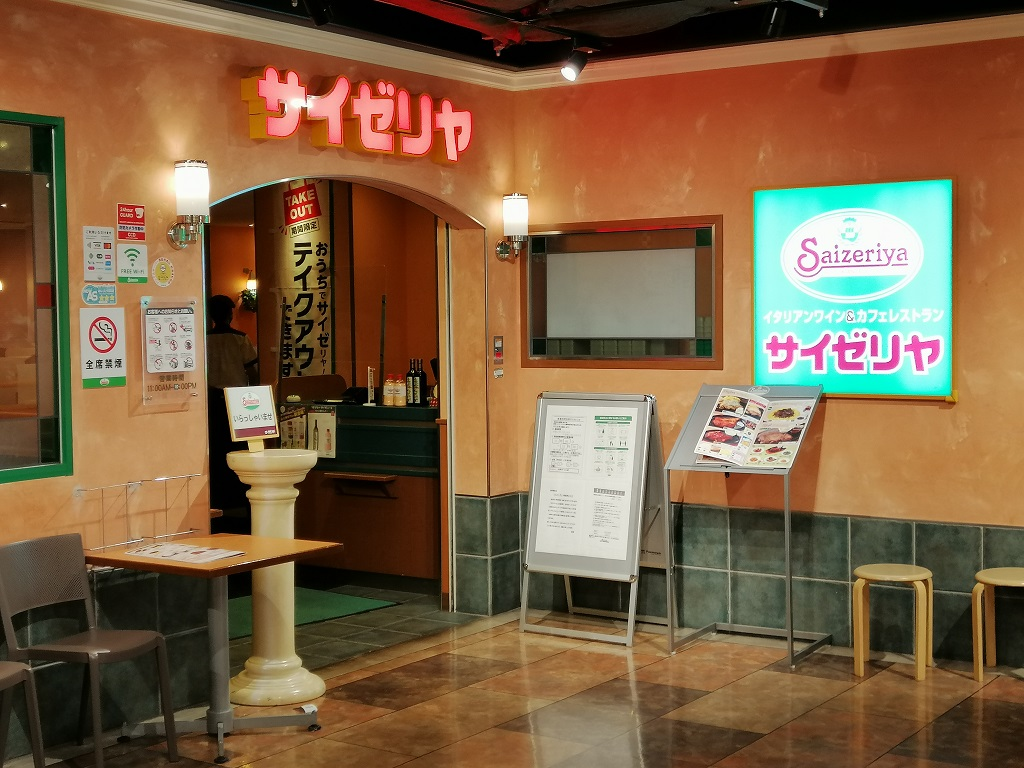
- A Saizeriya restaurant in Nagoya, Japan
- Type: Public company
- Traded as: TYO: 7581
- Industry: Restaurants
- Founded: Yoshikawa, Saitama, Japan (May 1, 1973; 53 years ago)
- Headquarters: 〒 342-0008 No. 5, No. 2 Asahi, Yoshikawa City, Saitama Prefecture, Japan
- Area served: Japan, Singapore, Taiwan, Hong Kong, Mainland China
- Key people: Yasuhiko Shōgaki (正垣泰彦) (Executive director)
- Services: Japanese-style Italian cuisine
- Revenue: ¥ 82,700,000,000 JPY
- Total assets: ¥ 61,000,000,000 JPY
- Number of employees: 1,454
- Website: www.saizeriya.co.jp Japan, (in Japanese) www.saizeriya.com.sg Singapore, (in English)

Saizeriya (サイゼリヤ) is a Japanese chain of family-style Italian yōshoku restaurants, commonly abbreviated as "Saize" (サイゼ). It is managed by Saizeriya Co. (株式会社サイゼリヤ, Kabushiki-gaisha Saizeriya). Its headquarters are in Yoshikawa, Saitama. Beyond Japan, the restaurant also has a presence in China, Hong Kong, Taiwan, and Singapore, and has a factory in Melton, Victoria, Australia.

== History ==
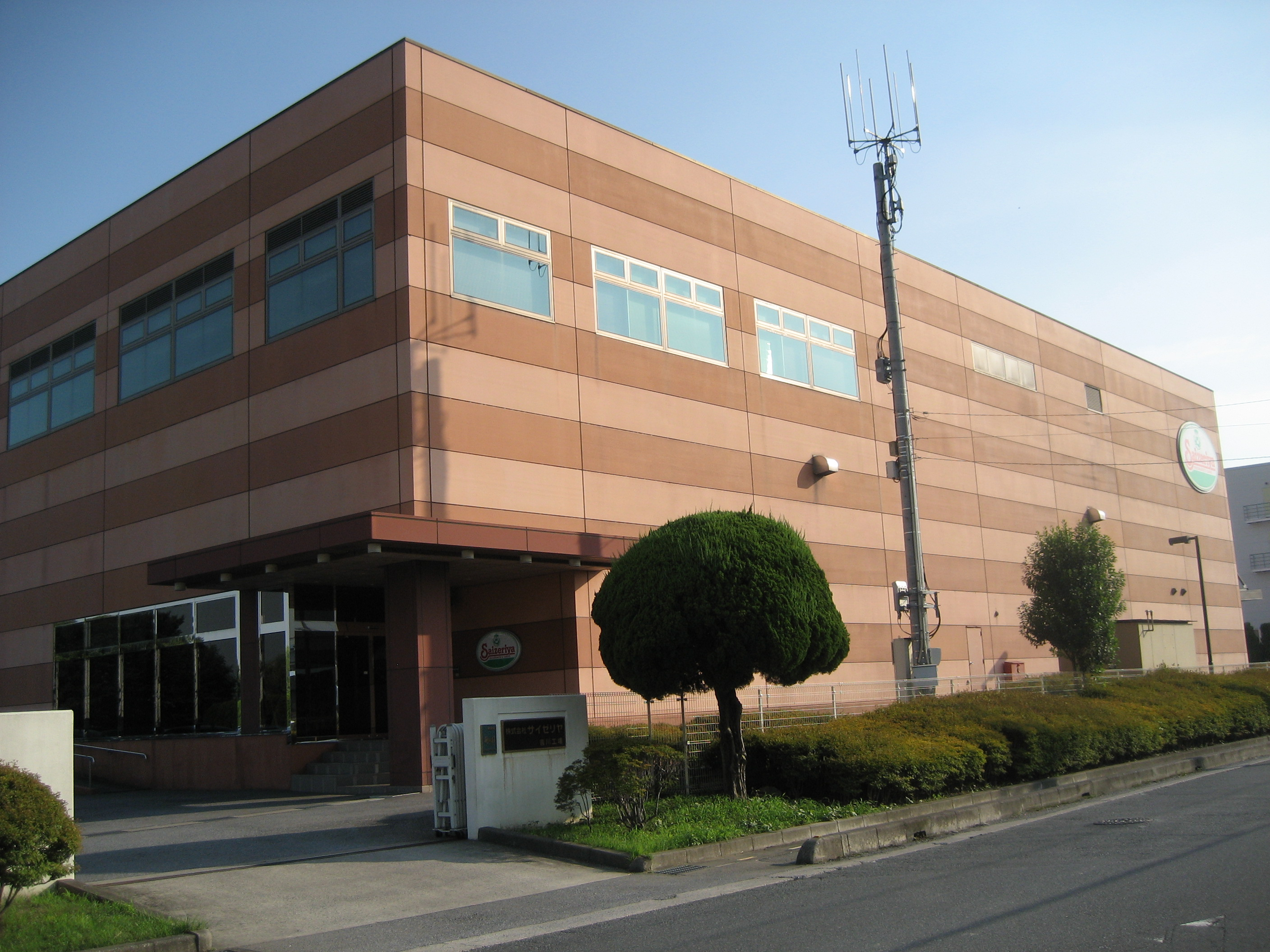
Saizeriya headquarters, the Yoshikawa factory

The president of the company, Yasuhiko Shōgaki, worked at a western restaurant in Ichikawa, Chiba called Saizeriya while he was attending Tokyo University of Science. The manager at the time recognized his skill, and when Shōgaki became a senior in school, he inherited the restaurant. Italian cuisine was becoming more popular at the time, so Shōgaki converted the restaurant to Italian food - but customers stopped coming. Shōgaki then cut the prices by 70%, and the restaurant did so well that lines started to appear, and he had to open another store.

In May 1973, Shōgaki established a kabushiki gaisha called Maria-nu (マリアーヌ) in Ichikawa. The company then started expanding as a restaurant chain. The headquarters continued to be in Chiba prefecture. In 1987, the company changed its name to Maria-no (マリアーノ). In 1992, the company again changed its name to Saizeriya.

Since then, the network of stores has grown considerably to over 750 stores. There are a few forms that Saizeriya locations can take: they can be found in any number of buildings in Japan, as roadside stores, as piloti types, locations in commerce buildings and train stations, and so on. If a desirable location is found, without questioning, they will actively continue in the capital region. Because Saizeriya will open a store where a competitor has withdrawn, the form of Saizeriya stores, as well as their trademarked logo that is posted on billboards is often varied. Starting on August 24, 2005, they started operating a fast food store called "Eat Run" (イート・ラン). As of 2008, they operate three stores: one in Jūjō, Tokyo, one in Kawaguchi, and one in Aoto, Katsushika, Tokyo.

In October 2006 it was announced that Saizeriya's stores had done the best in 8 years. As of August of that year, sales were up by 3%. Customer numbers were up by 2.1%, and the average amount spent per customer had increased by 0.8%. The company was able to cover the price of increasing its stores, as well as also improving the quality of the menu and achieve better results while also increasing its base customers and amount sold. By using prefabricated ingredients in the central kitchen that largely reduces procurement and processing cost, Saizeriya is able to provide Italian cuisine at a lower price.

In August 2008, Saizeriya Co,. Ltd. started a chain of fast-food hamburger specialty shops called "Eat Run" (イートラン). There are currently six shops. In June 2003, a subsidiary was established in Shanghai, and as of August 2007, fifteen stores were in operation there.

The restaurant was in the news in Japan for serving pizza with melamine-tainted dough from China in October 2008.

== Timeline ==
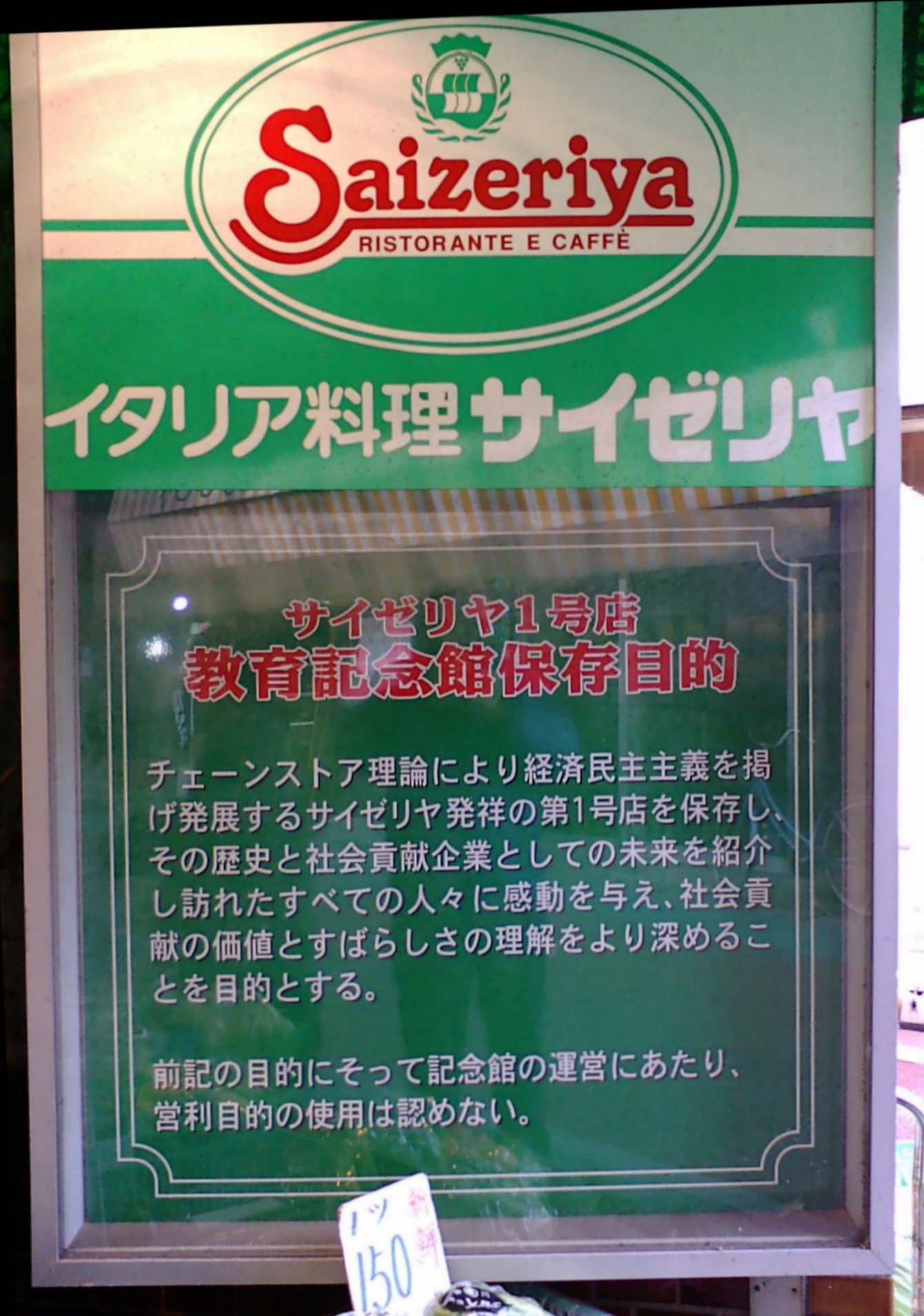
The sign put up after the closing of the first Saizeriya store, which is now a Memorial Training Building

- April 1968 - Yasuhiko Shōgaki takes over the Saizeriya store and starts a private business.
- May 1973 - The private business becomes a corporation, and the Maria-nu company is established.
- December 1977 - Multiple stores start opening.
- April 1981 - Start of the shopping center stores: in LaLaPort.
- May 1983 - The company moves to a new location in Ichikawa, Chiba.
- March 1987 - Start of the train station stores: in Shapō.
- April 1987 - The company changes its name to Maria-no.
- October 1987 - An "Order Entry System" is introduced.
- September 1989 - Start of the suburban roadside stores: in Mito Kaidō.
- October 1991 - The company moves to Funabashi, Chiba.
- September 1992 - The company changes its name to Saizeriya.
- July 1994 - The 100th store is opened in Enoshima.
- October 1997 - A factory is built in Yoshikawa, Saitama. The company moves there.
- April 1998 - The company registers its stock with JASDAQ Securities Exchange and starts selling.
- July 1999 - Two stocks are listed on the Tokyo Stock Exchange.
- August 2000 - One stock changes its designation.
- October 2001 - The 500th store is opened in Kyōnan, Yamanashi.
- December 2003 - The first overseas store is opened in Shanghai.
- August 2005 - "Eat Run", a new fast food store, opens.
- November 2005 - "Spa-Q" and "TacoQ", two new stores, open in Saitama.
- April 2007 - "Saizeriya Express", a new low cost spaghetti shop, opens in Green Walk, Hachioji, Tokyo.
- December 2007 - A store opens in Guangzhou, China.
- 2008 - Saizeriya opens its first store in Singapore.
- October 2008 - Controversy regarding serving pizza with melamine-tainted dough from China.
- October 2010 - Saizeriya Italian Restaurant (薩莉亞意式餐廳) opens in North Point, Hong Kong.
- 2010 - Saizeriya opens around 6 stores in Beijing, China.
- 2019 - Saizeriya opened in multiple outlets across Hong Kong through the 2010s.
- 2026 - Saizeriya opened its first store in Malaysia in Kuala Lumpur.

== Gallery ==
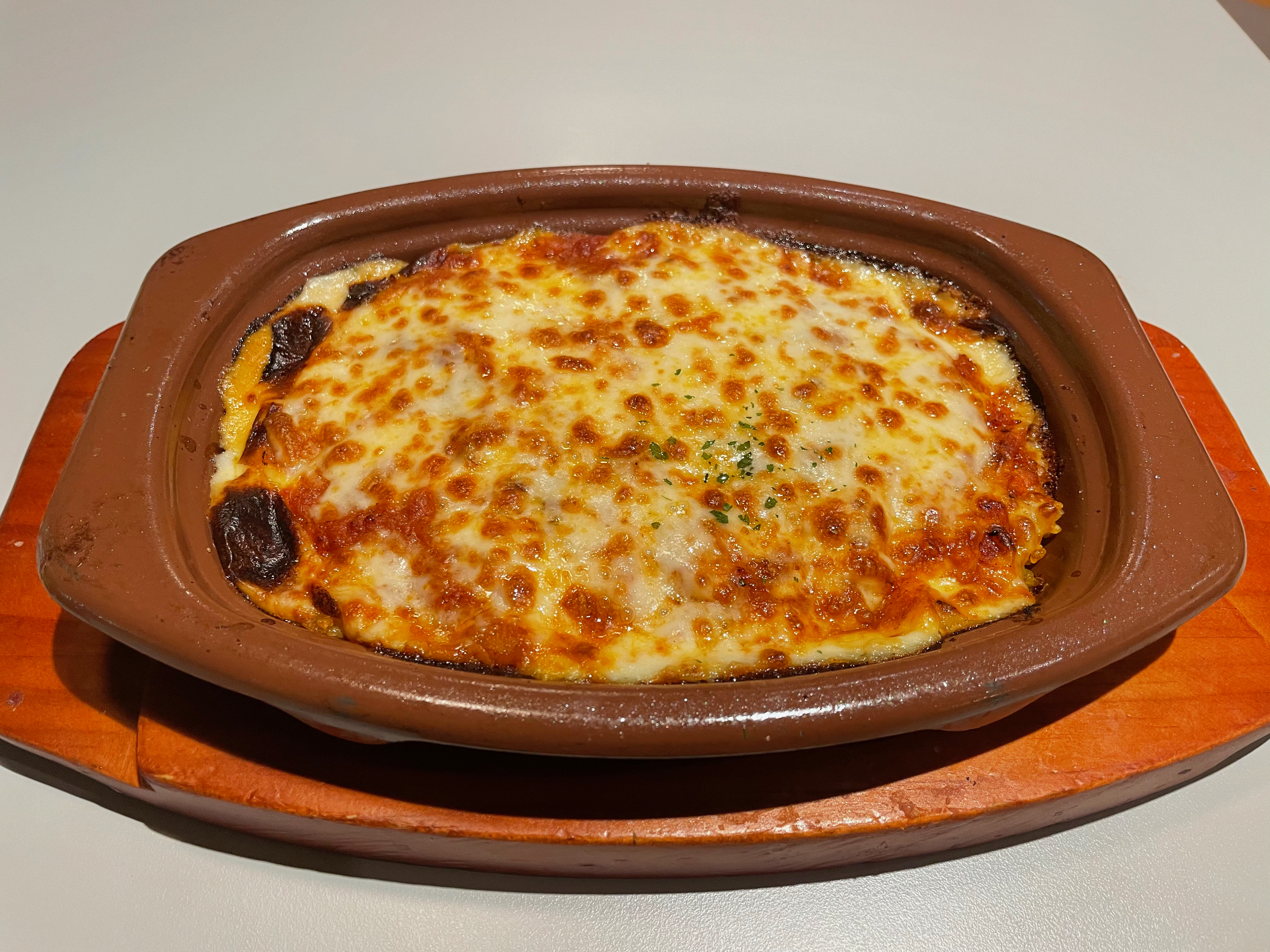
A "Milano style" doria

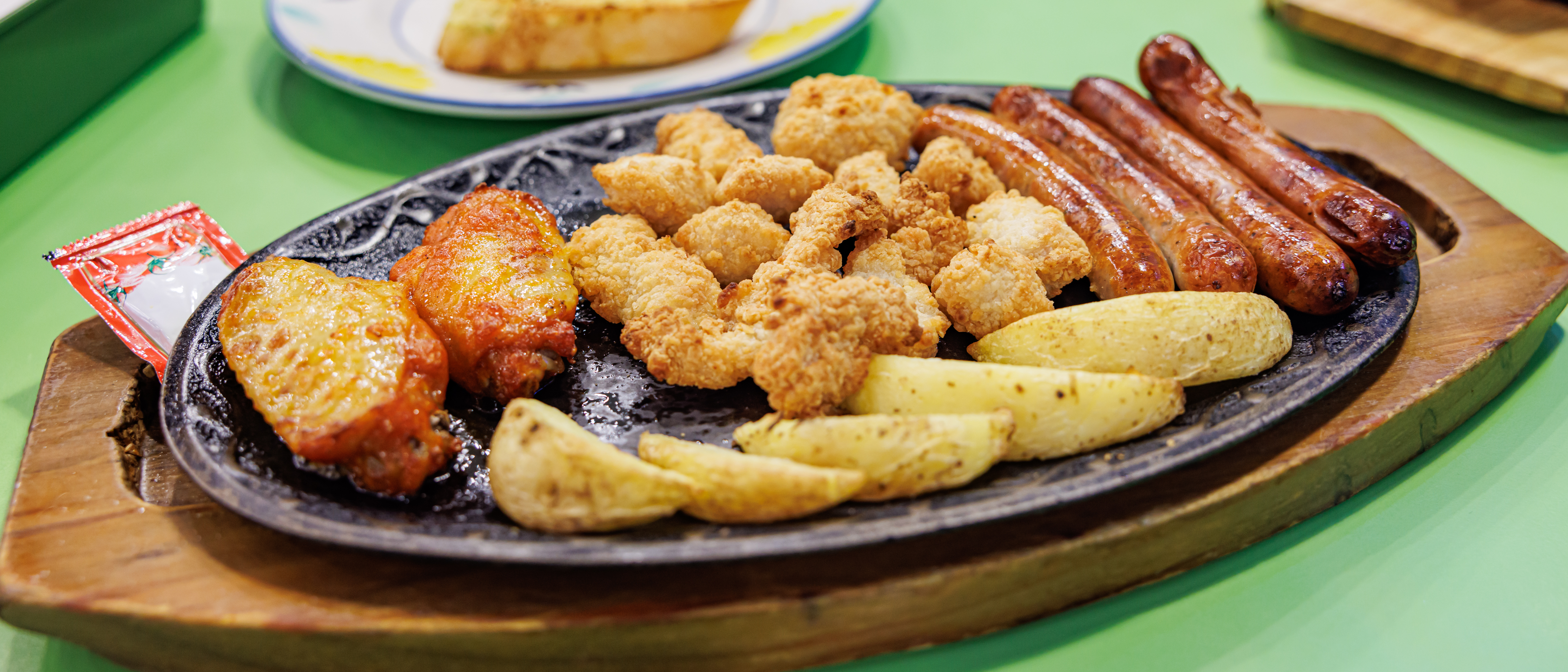
Meat platter from a store in Shenzhen

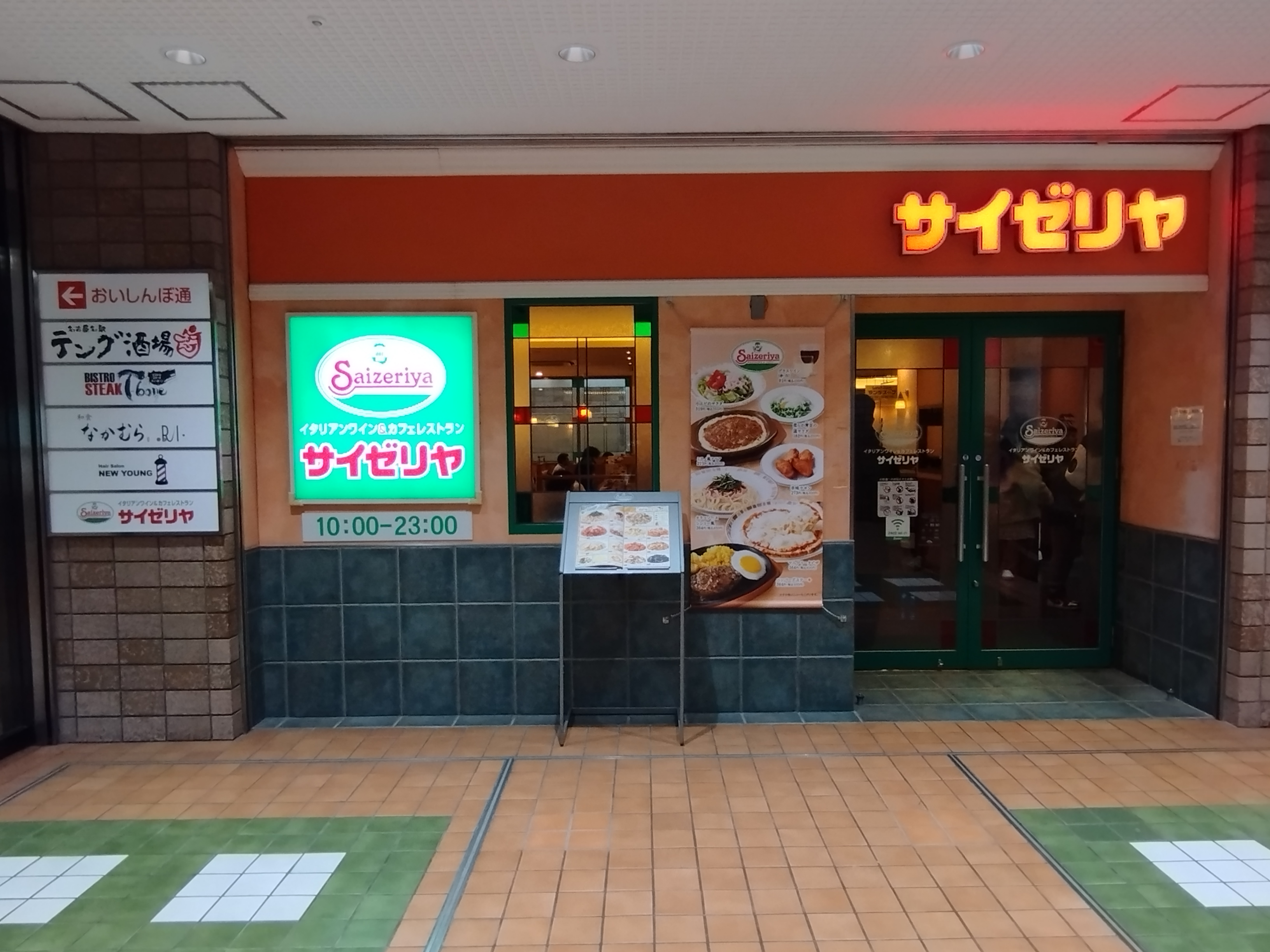
In Nagoya, Japan

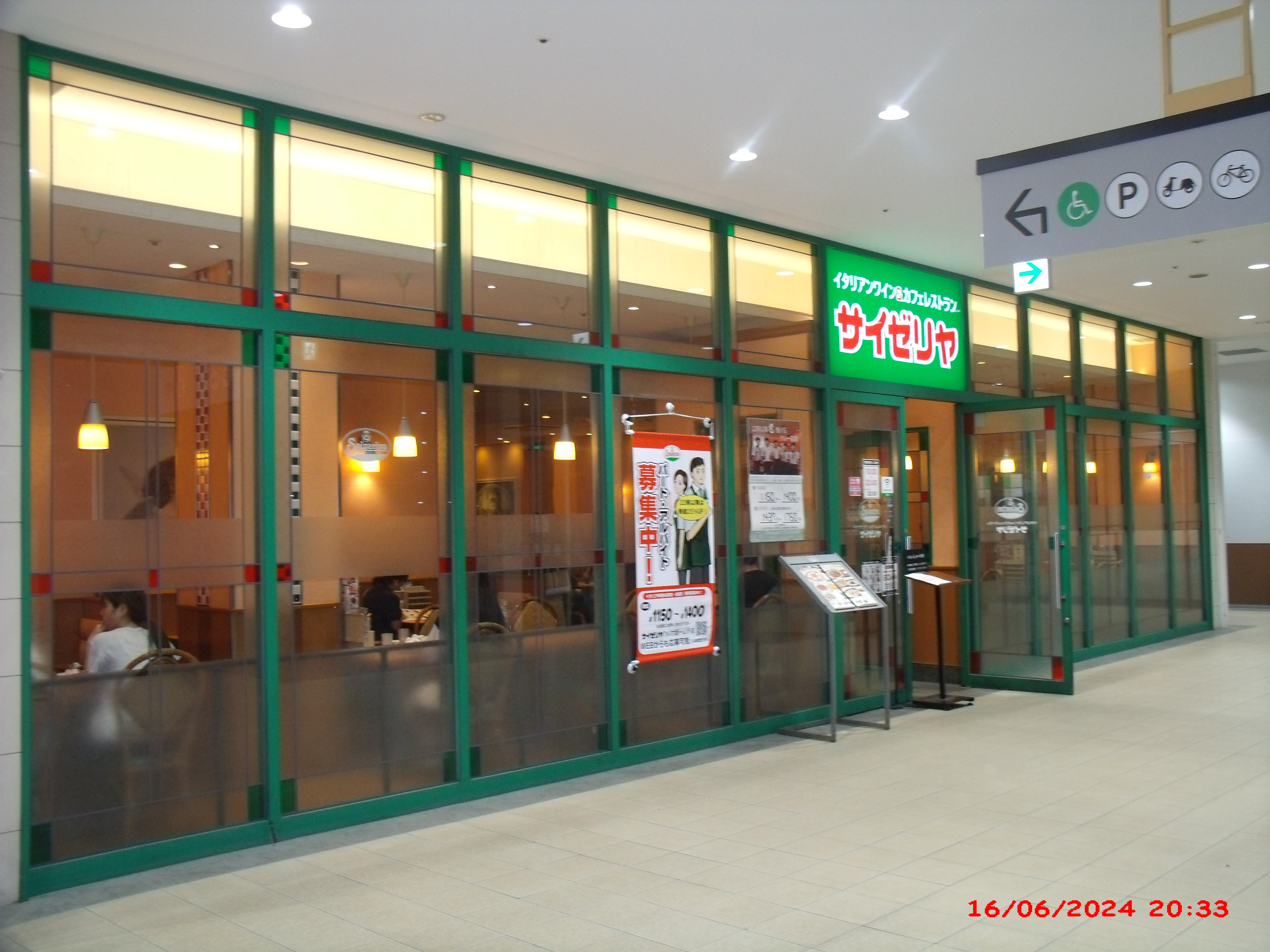
In Osaka, Japan

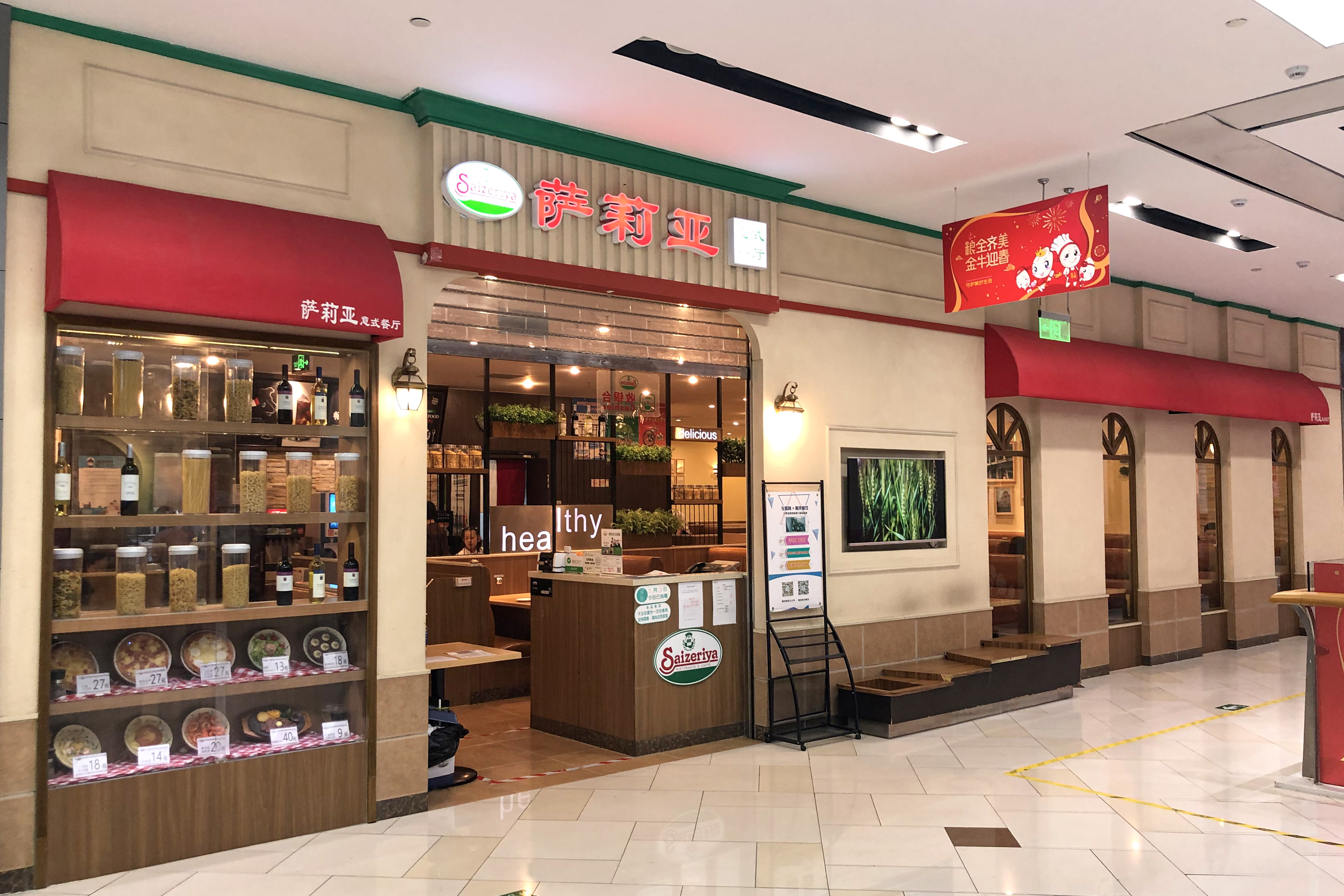
In Beijing, China

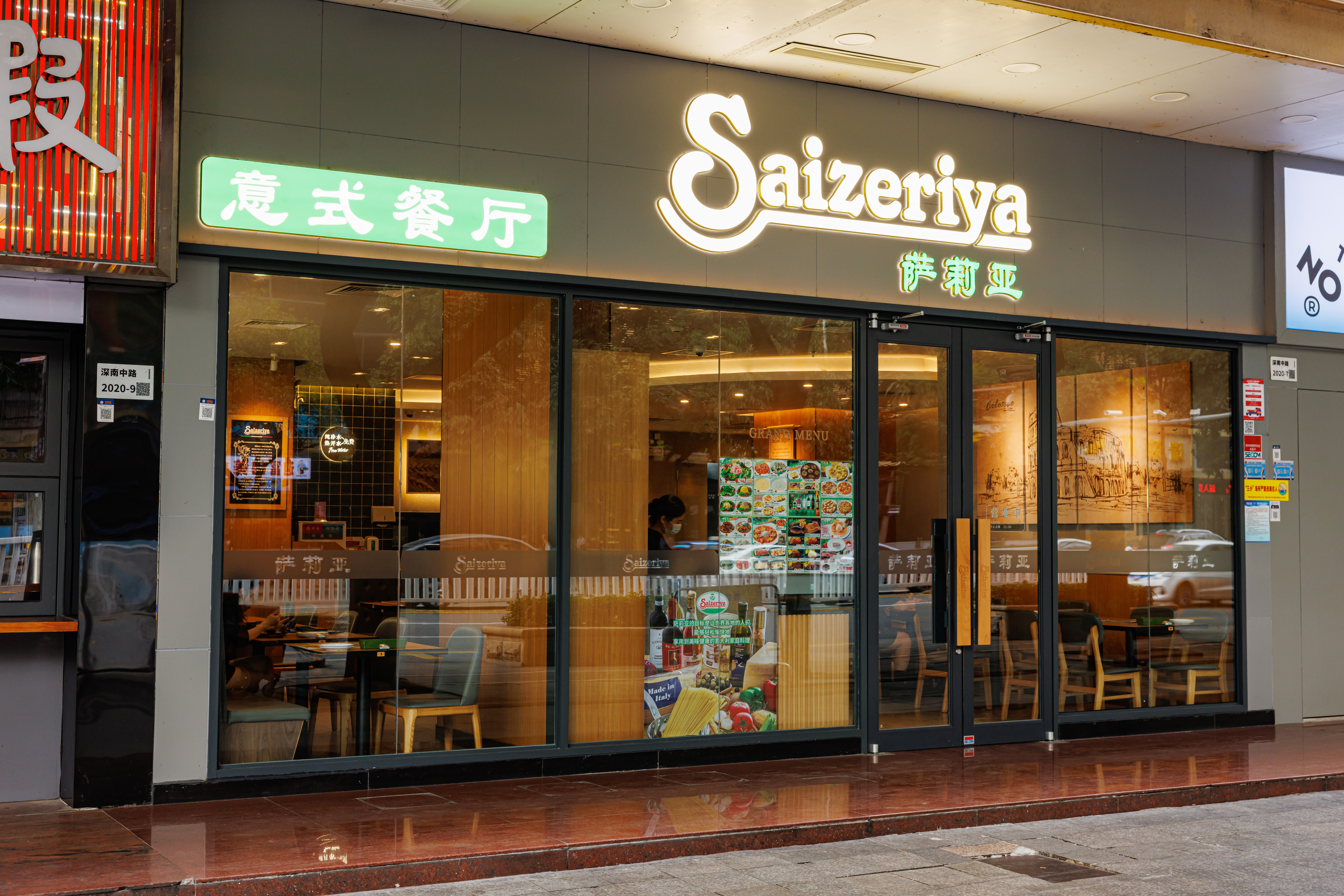
In Shenzhen, China

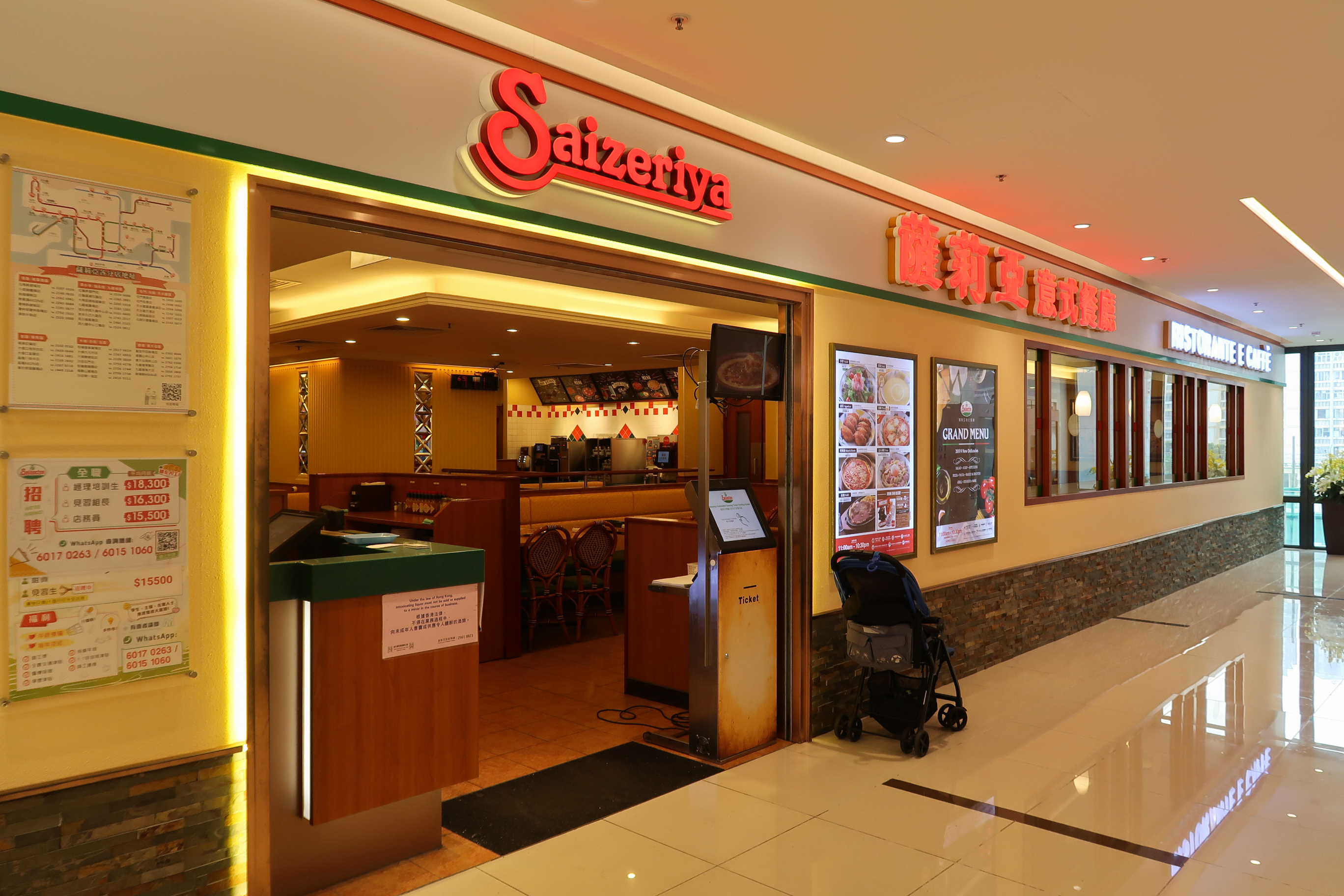
In Tsuen Wan, Hong Kong
