= Baked rice =

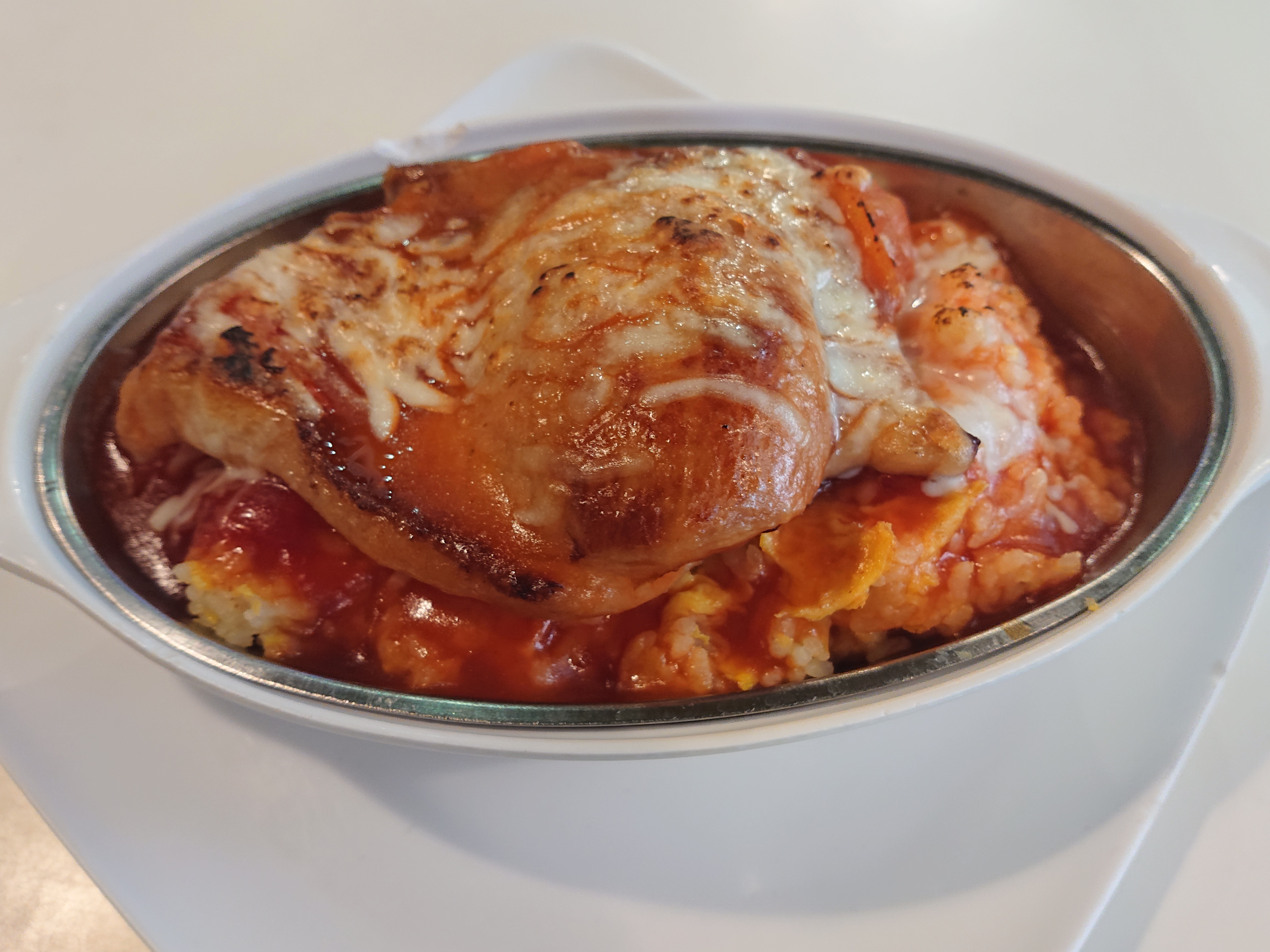
Baked pork chop rice

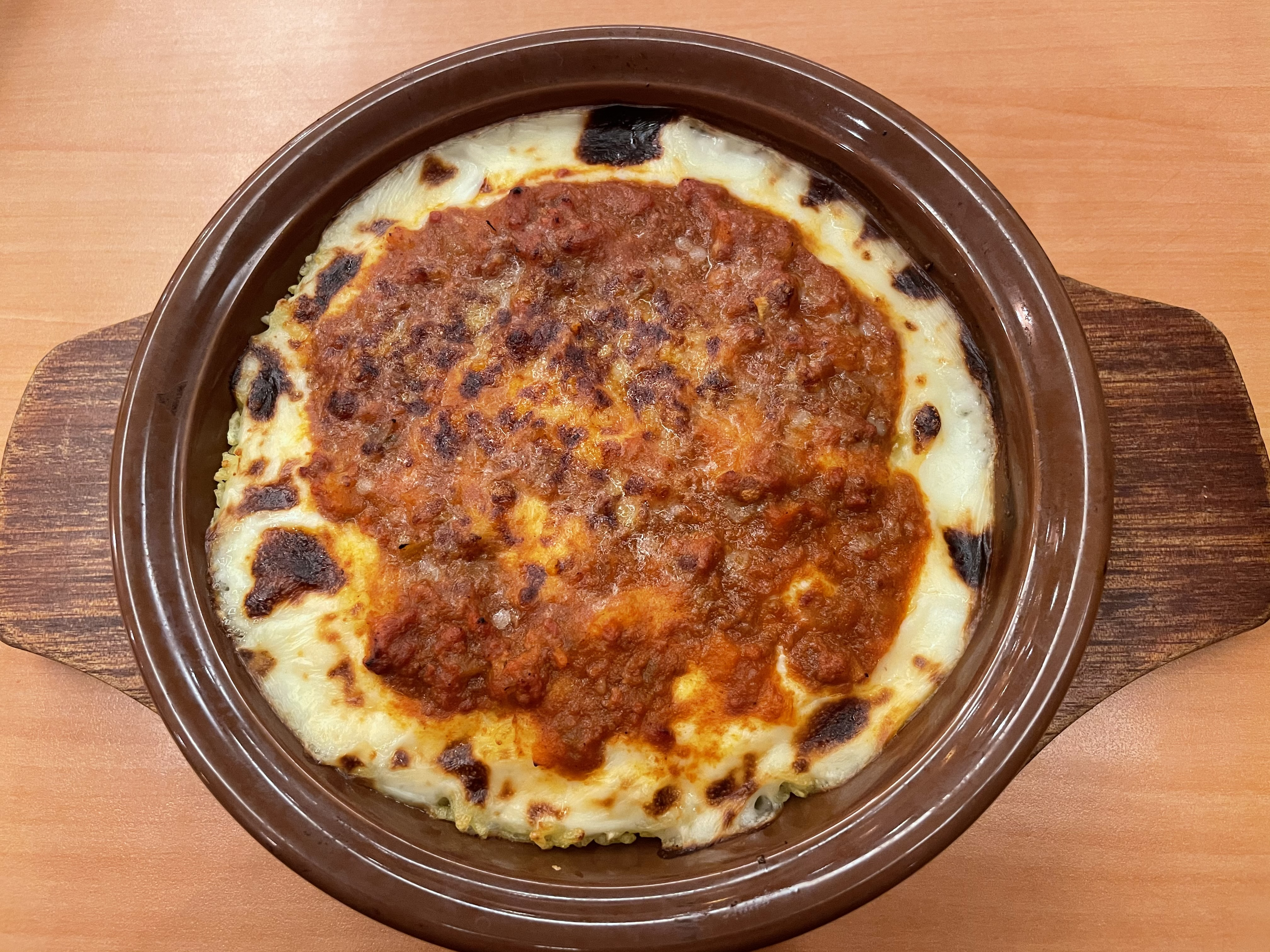
Doria

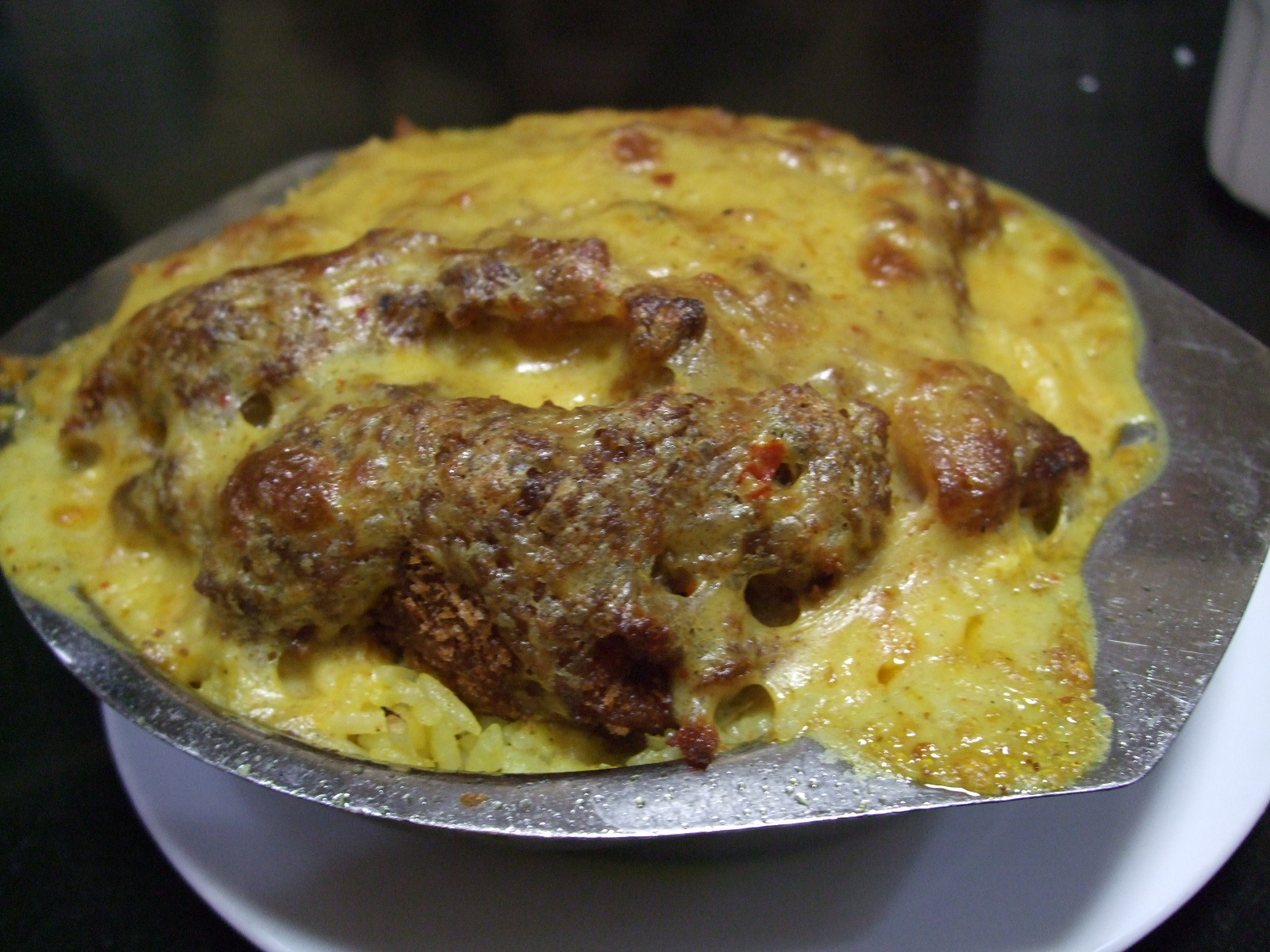
Galinha à portuguesa

Baked rice is a dish incorporating rice topped with meat and a sauce, combining Western and Eastern cultural influences. Notable examples of baked rice dishes include:

- Baked pork chop rice, a Hong Kong dish with tomato sauce and cheese
- Doria (food), a Japanese dish with béchamel sauce and cheese
- Galinha à portuguesa, a Macanese dish with Portuguese sauce and chicken
