= Doutor =

Doutor (doctor in Portuguese) may refer to:

- Doutor (footballer), Pedro Octávio de Camargo Penteado (1917–2001), Brazilian footballer
- Doutor Coffee, Japanese coffee shop franchising
