= Sopa de lacassá =

Macanese soup

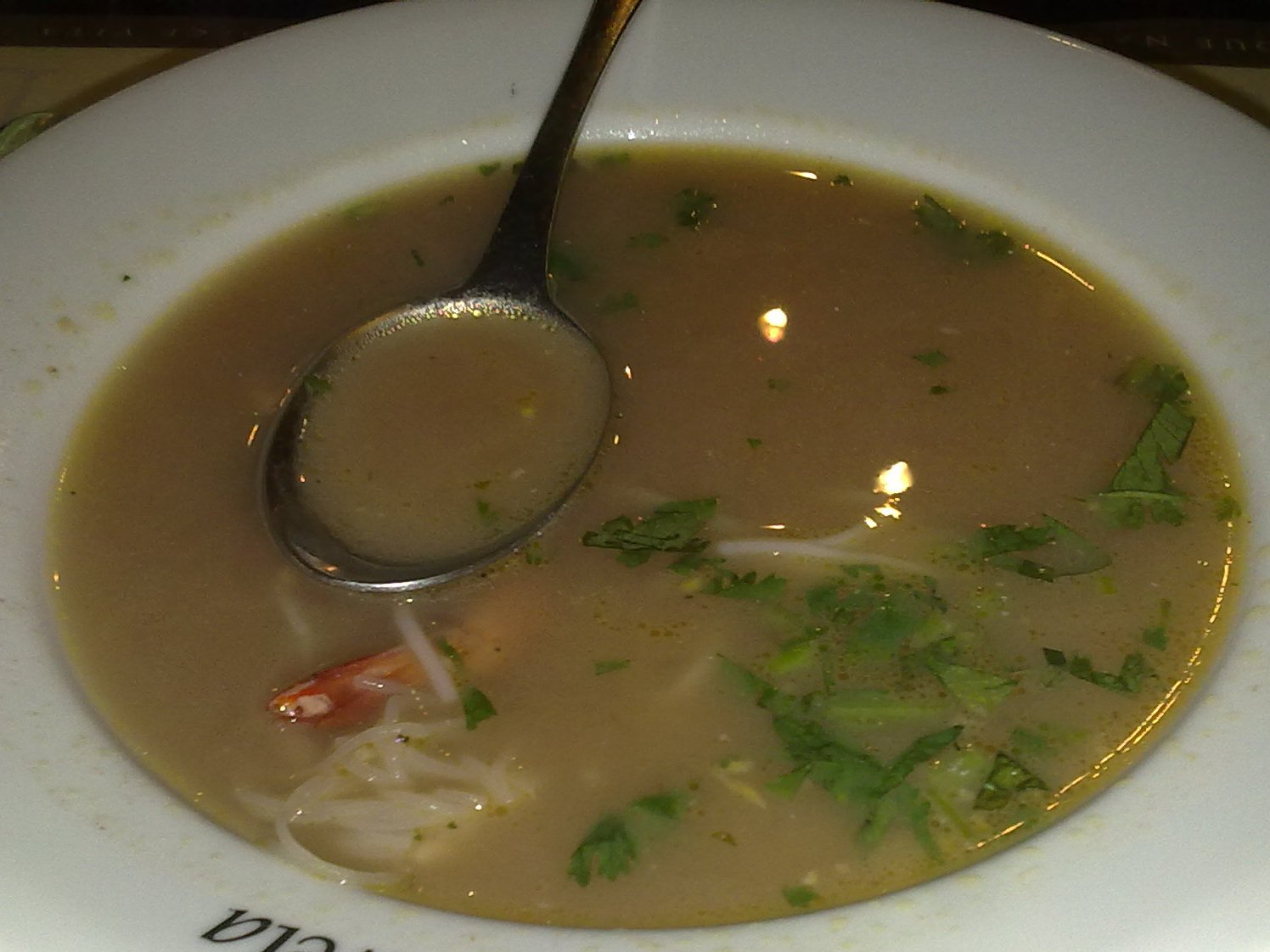
- Lacassa Soup

Lacassá Soup (Portuguese: Sopa de lacassá, traditional Chinese: 鮮蝦濃湯; simplified Chinese: 鲜虾浓汤) is a Macanese soup.

== History ==
The soup has its roots in Malacca, and is believed to be an evolution of Laksa soup from Peranakan cuisine. The word Lacassá is noted to be a Macanese term for vermicelli, with roots in Indian languages.

As it contains no meat, Lacassá Soup is traditionally consumed on Christmas Eve, historically a day of abstinence for Catholic faithfuls. Lacassá Soup is also featured in a proper Cha Gordo, a social event that has been likened to high tea, and features multiple dishes.

== Ingredients ==
Lacassá Soup contains vermicelli (hence its name, as explained above), shrimp, and balichão.
