= Tacho (disambiguation) =

Tacho is an indigenous ethnic group of South Sudan.

Tacho may also refer to:

- Tacho (food), a dish in the cuisine of Macau
- Anastasio Somoza García (1896–1956), nicknamed "Tacho", president of Nicaragua 1937–1947

== See also ==
- Tachograph, a device on a vehicle that records speed, distance, and driver activity
- Tachometer, an instrument measuring rotation speed, as in a motor
