= Cha Gordo =

Culinary tradition in Macau

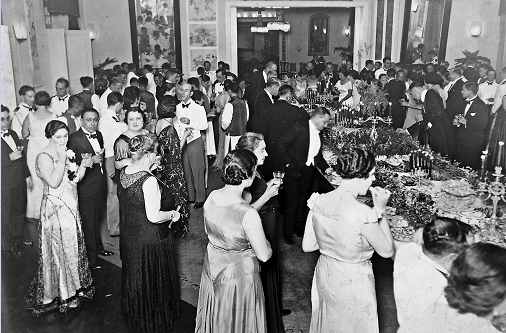
Cha Gordo feast in the 1930s

Cha Gordo (Portuguese: Chá Gordo; Chinese: 肥茶; lit. 'Fat Tea') is a culinary tradition amongst the Macanese community in Macau that is likened to high tea.

== History ==
Historically, families with Portuguese heritage in Macau would host a Cha Gordo for a number of occasions, including Catholic holidays, christening, or birthdays, but it can be held for any reason. Some families, historically, would even host one on a weekly basis.

A Cha Gordo would take place following a Macanese wedding, instead of the elaborate banquet seen in Chinese weddings.

== Composition ==
Cha Gordos are noted to be elaborate, consisting of 12 dishes or more. Cha Gordos typically start in the mid-afternoon, in order to allow the children to eat, and allow the adults to continue with the entertainment, as the children go to bed.

Some of the dishes included in a Cha Gordo include Bolinhos de bacalhau, Minchi, Sopa de lacassá, and Tacho.

== Present day ==
Due to cramped living conditions in modern-day Macau, Cha Gordo has become a much rarer affair, but they have been held as community events on a regular basis (such as on Christmas), in an effort to preserve Macanese culture.
