= Excelsior Caffé =

Japanese coffeehouse chain

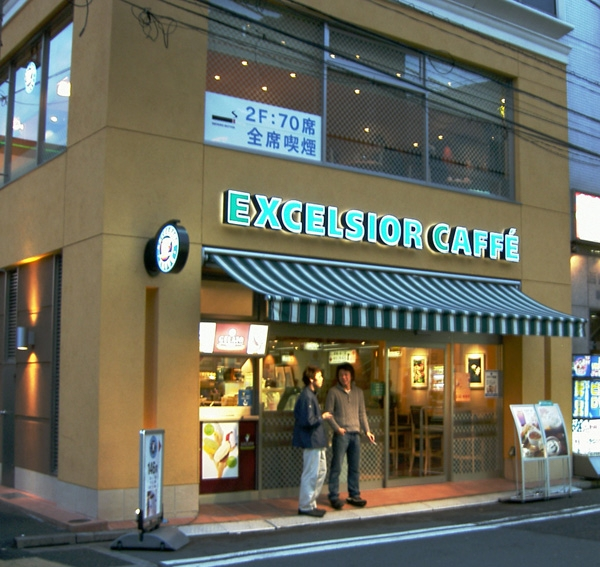
- A location in Chiyoda Ward in Tokyo
- Native name: エクセルシオール カフェ
- Romanized name: Ekuserushiōru Kafe
- Company type: Subsidiary
- Industry: Food and drink
- Founded: 1999
- Number of locations: 123 (2021)
- Area served: Japan
- Owner: Doutor Coffee
- Website: www.doutor.co.jp/exc/

Excelsior Caffé is a Japanese chain of coffeehouses owned by Doutor Coffee. Established in 1999, it operates exclusively in Japan. The restaurant has an Italian style, hence its use of "caffé" instead of only "café" in its name.

== History ==
The company was created in 1999 by Doutor Coffee. Its first location opened in July of that year in Seavans A Mall in Shibaura. Doutor was a more grab-and-go coffeehouse without any baristas, using machines instead. They wanted to create a more "premium" experience for its customers, allowing them to have a place to sit and relax in a quiet atmosphere. In 2000, American coffee chain Starbucks filed for an interim injunction against the Doutor, saying that their logo (which has since changed) and appearance looked too much like its own.

In 2021, Excelsior started using the food sharing service TABETE to reduce food loss.

== Menu ==
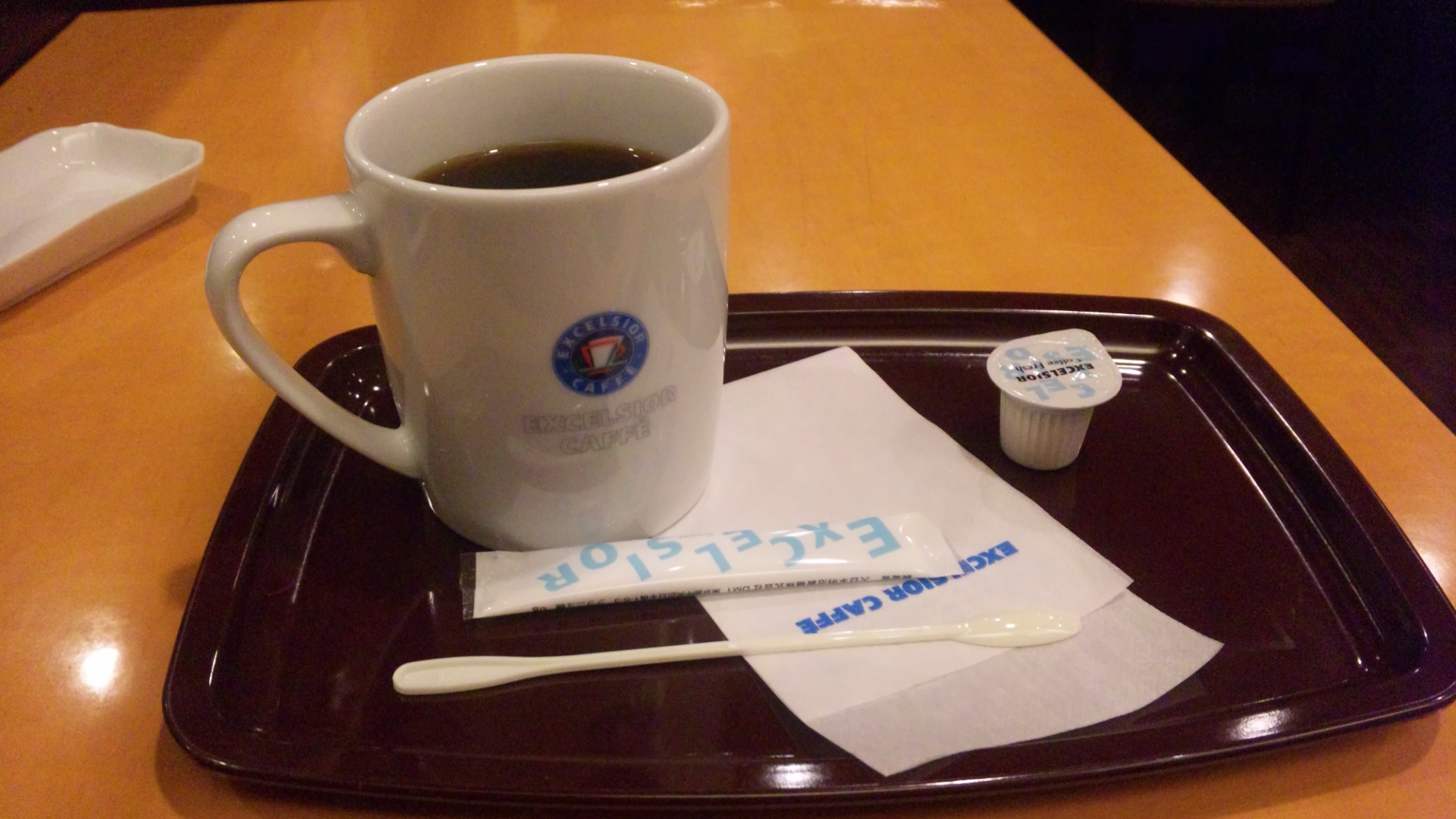
Coffee from Excelsior Caffé

The chain has a seasonal menu that changes often. Still, it also has many stationary drinks, including lattes, uji matcha, hōjicha, mocha, Americano, milk tea, espresso panna cotta, Unshu mandarin orange juice, and lemonade. It uses four varieties of coffee beans, Excelsior, Yirgachefe Washed, Decaffeinated, and Organic Guatemala, from Brazil and Tanzania, Ethiopia, Colombia, and Guatemala, respectively. The milk used in the drinks comes from cows in Hokkaido. Other than beverages, the coffeehouse serves hot dogs, sandwiches (consisting of roast beef and Danish cream cheese, shrimp and salmon cream cheese, pastrami and lettuce, and mortadella and Gouda cheese), beef stew with mozzarella, yuzu koshō doria, shrimp and avocado doria, and pasta (with varieties such as crab tomato crean, salmon and four-cheese, shiso soy sauce with mascarpone, and bolognese with truffle oil).

== Locations ==
As of 2021, Excelsior Caffé has 123 stores, all in Japan. It is mainly concentrated in the Kantō region.
