= Balchão =

Indian dish with a spicy and sour sauce

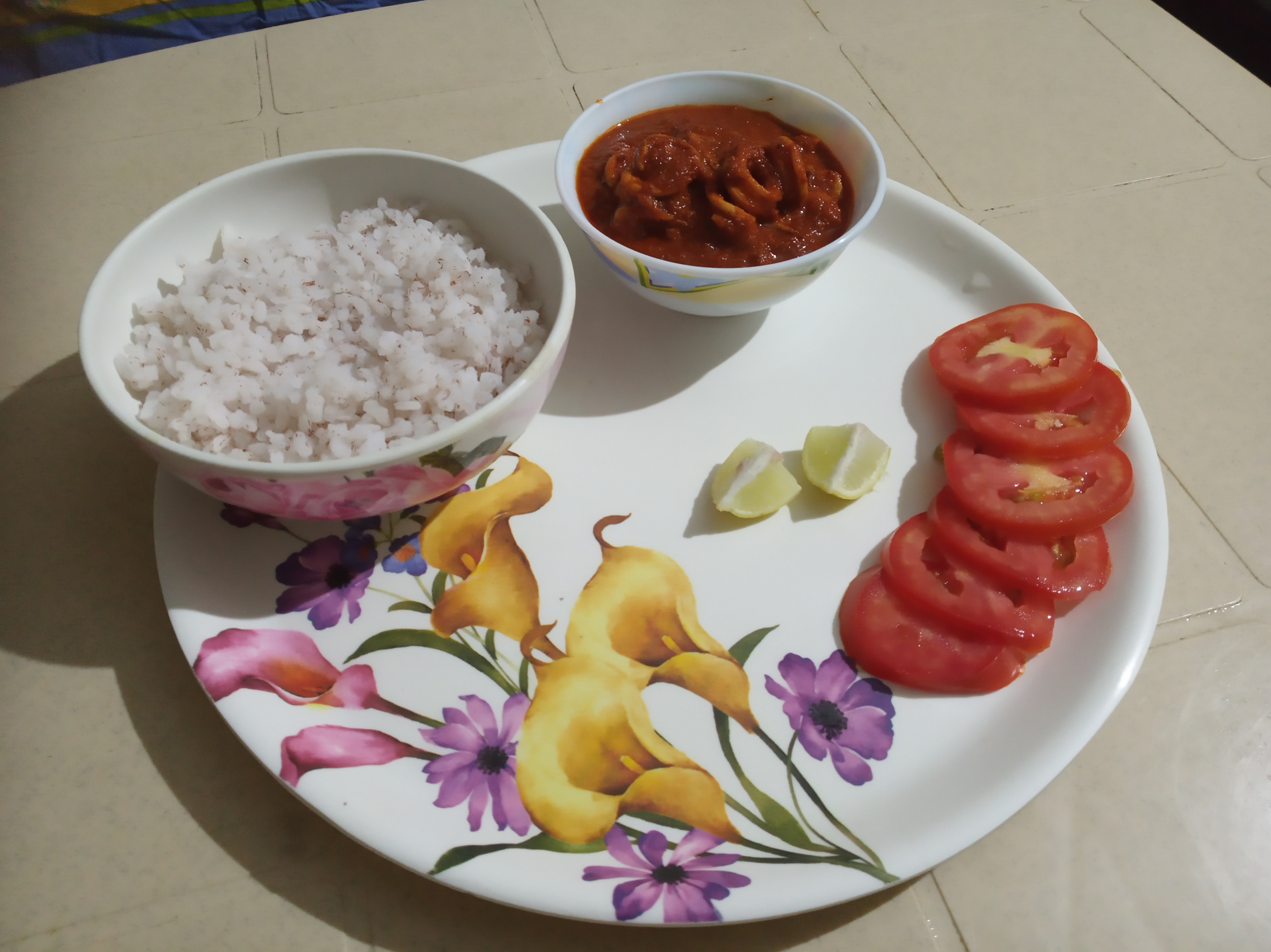
- Goan calamari balchao with parboiled rice
- Alternative names: Balichow
- Type: Sauce or curry
- Place of origin: Portugal
- Region or state: Goa, Malvan
- Main ingredients: Fish, prawns, or pork

Balchão, or balichow, is a Goan dish consisting of fried fresh prawns in a spicy and vinegary sauce.

== Ingredients ==
Balchão is a method of cooking fish (de peixe), prawns (de camarão), or pork (de porco) in a spicy and sour tomato-chili sauce. It resembles pickling and can be made days in advance, then served without heating. Some Goans make prawn balchão with tamarind sauce.

The ingredients may include prawns, oil, onions chopped fine, tomatoes, garlic paste or cloves, ginger paste or ginger, dried red chillies, cumin seed, mustard seeds, cinnamon, cloves, sugar, vinegar and salt. Traditional balchão uses a paste made from dried shrimp known as galmbo in Konkani.

== Preparation ==
Ginger, garlic and roasted spices are ground into a paste with the vinegar. The prawns are fried in oil until opaque and removed from the pan. Then onions and tomatoes are fried, and the spice-vinegar paste, sugar, and salt are added. This is fried until the oil begins to separate from the masala. The prawns are then added back, and the combination is cooked a few more minutes.

Balchão is usually served with plain hot boiled rice. It keeps well under refrigeration.

== History ==
Balchão was introduced to Goa by the Portuguese during Portuguese Goa, most likely from Malacca (today Melaka).

From the Mediterranean to Korea, making a tangy paste out of anchovies or shrimp has been a practice going back into the mists of history. The Romans used to call such a paste garum and it was an important cross-Mediterranean trade. Belachan is a similar paste or condiment all over Southeast Asia. In Indonesia, ikan bilis made out of anchovies is served in many dishes.

The Portuguese may indeed have facilitated trade between Goa and Southeast Asia in the 16th century. But an equally plausible and perhaps more likely explanation, is that Indian traders in the first millennium of our common era had colonized and traded extensively with Southeast Asia—what used to be until recently called Indochina. They are the more likely source of the historical connection and similarity between balchao and belachan.

== Preparation ==
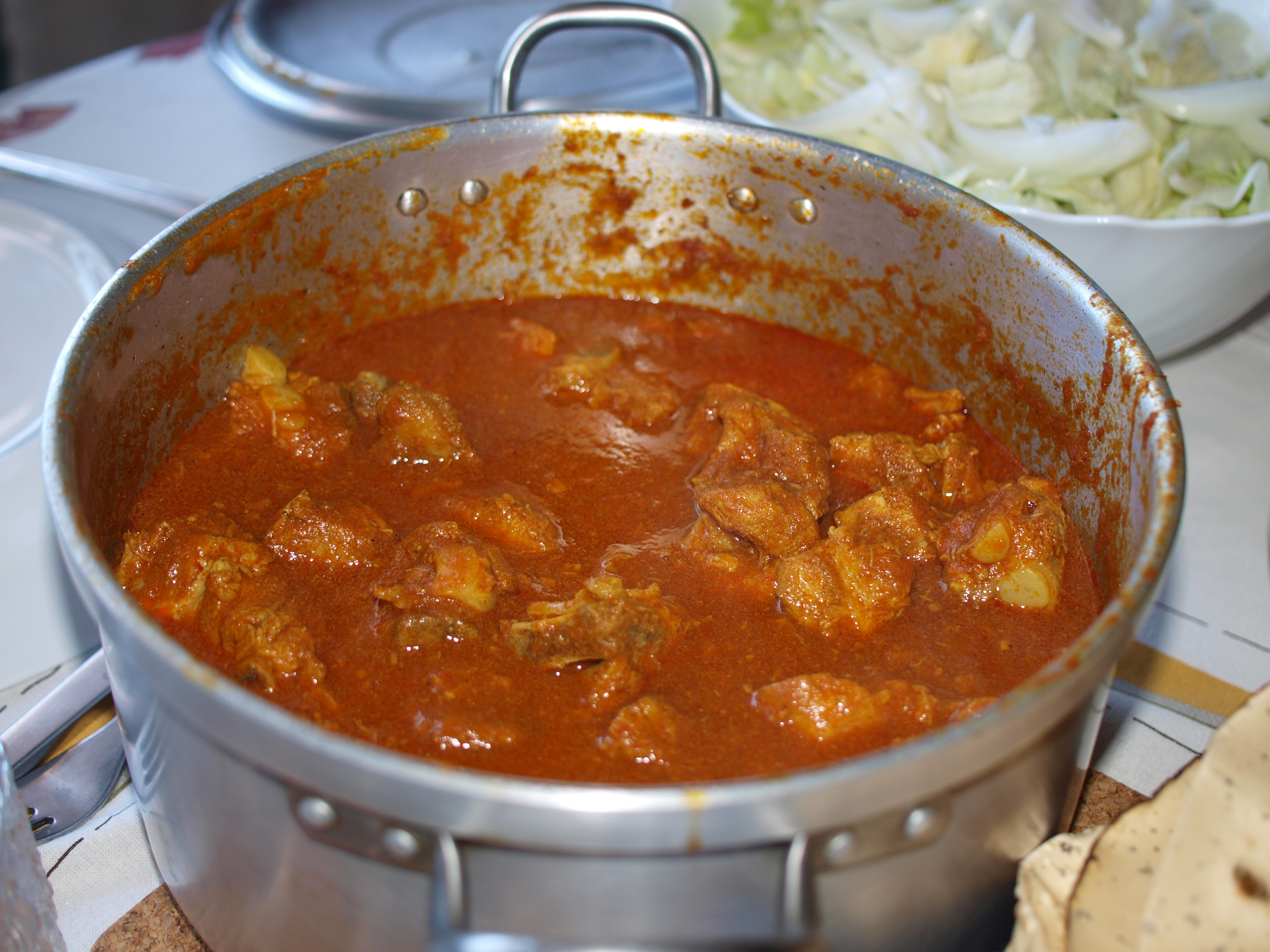
Pork balchão

Catholic homes may use coconut vinegar for its acidic sharpness, while Hindu families may use cane vinegar to make it milder. It is now common to use white vinegar or malt vinegar.

== See also ==
- Balichão, a related dish in Macau
- Indian cuisine
- List of pork dishes
- List of seafood dishes
