= Swiss wing =

Chicken wing dish of Hong Kong

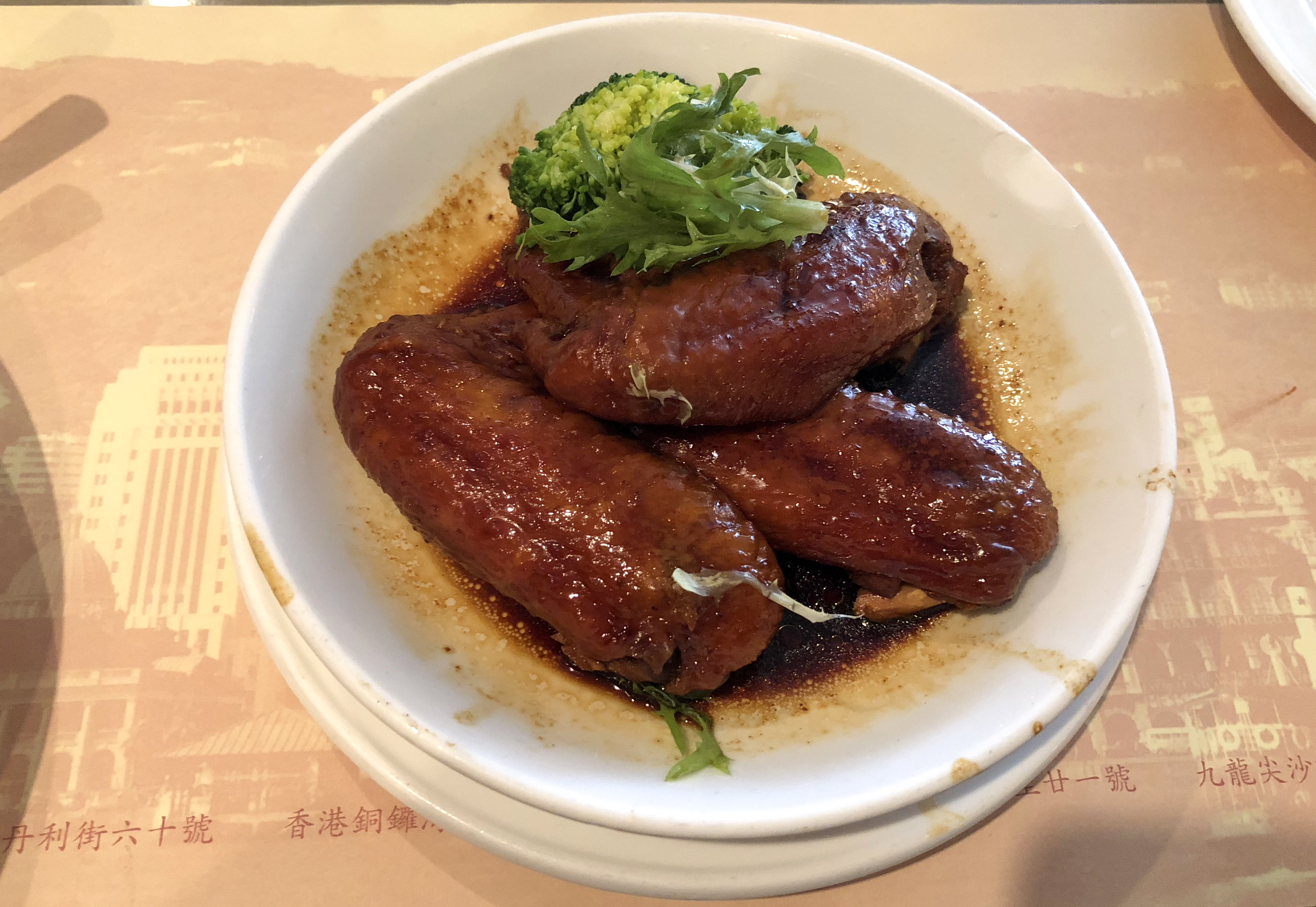
- Swiss wings served at Tai Ping Koon Restaurant
- Alternative names: Swiss chicken wing
- Place of origin: Hong Kong or Guangzhou
- Created by: Cantonese restaurants
- Main ingredients: chicken wing, soy sauce, star anise, pepper, onion, ginger, garlic, sugar

Swiss wing
- Traditional Chinese: 瑞士雞翼
- Simplified Chinese: 瑞士鸡翼
Transcriptions
Standard Mandarin
- Hanyu Pinyin: Ruìshì jī yì
Yue: Cantonese
- Jyutping: seoi6 si6 gai1 jik6

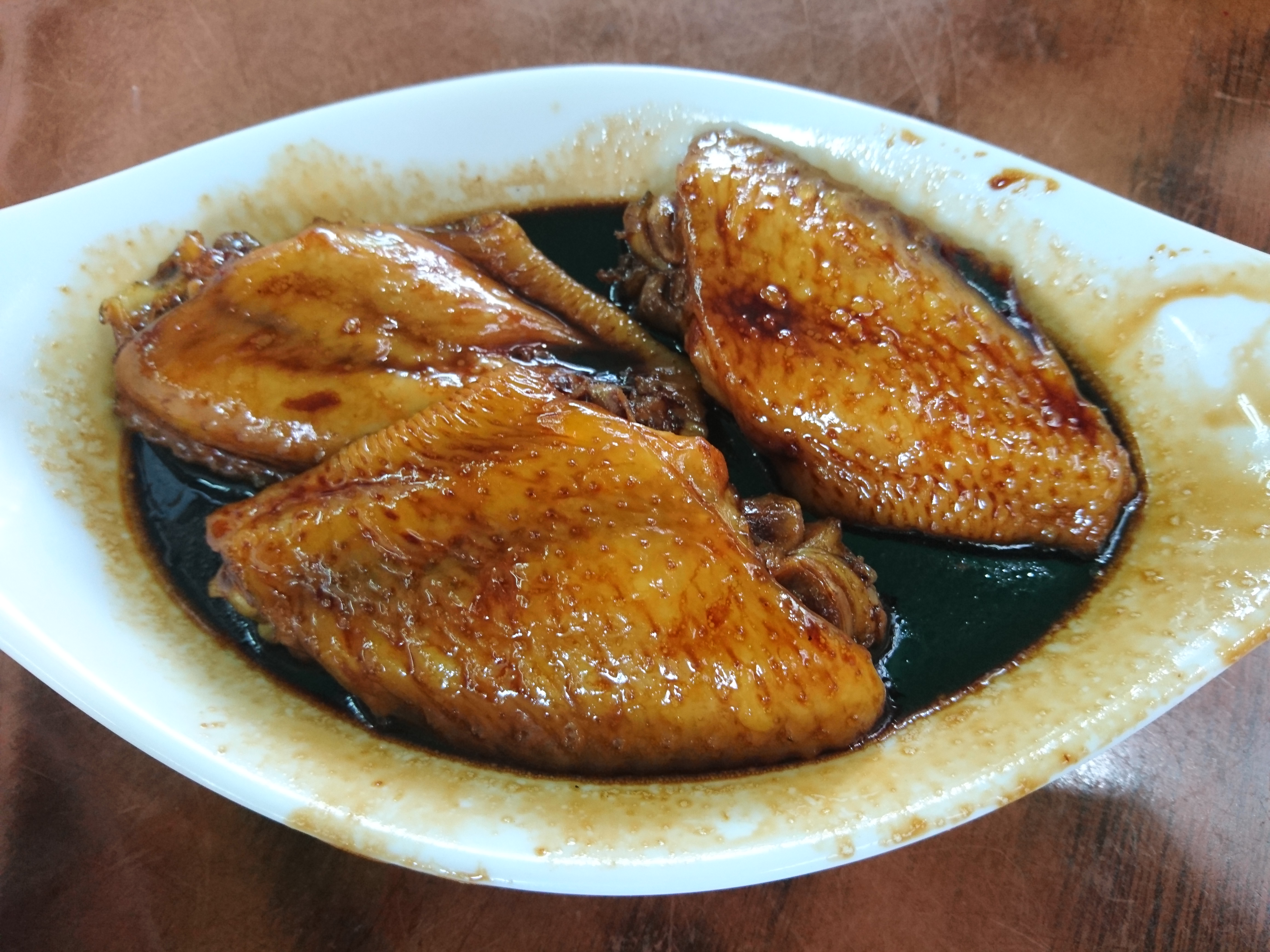
Swiss chicken wings

Swiss wing (traditional Chinese: 瑞士雞翼; simplified Chinese: 瑞士鸡翼; Jyutping: seoi^{6} si^{6} gai^{1} jik^{6}) is a kind of sweet soy sauce-flavored chicken wings served in some restaurants in Hong Kong. It is marinated in sauce made up of soy sauce, sugar, Chinese wine, and spices. Despite the name "Swiss", it is unrelated to Switzerland, similar to how Singapore-style noodles is unrelated to Singapore. Instead, it is believed to have originated in either Hong Kong or Guangzhou.

== Naming ==
There are no concrete answers as to the source or the name of the dish. One story—likely to be a mere urban legend—goes that a Westerner came across the dish "sweetened soya sauce chicken wings" in a restaurant, and asked a Chinese waiter what that was. The waiter, who did not speak perfect English, introduced the dish as "sweet wing". The customer misheard "sweet" as "Swiss", and the name "Swiss wing" has been used ever since.

== See also ==
- Buffalo wing
- List of chicken dishes
- Soy sauce chicken
