= Baked pork chop rice =

Hong Kong style fusion dish

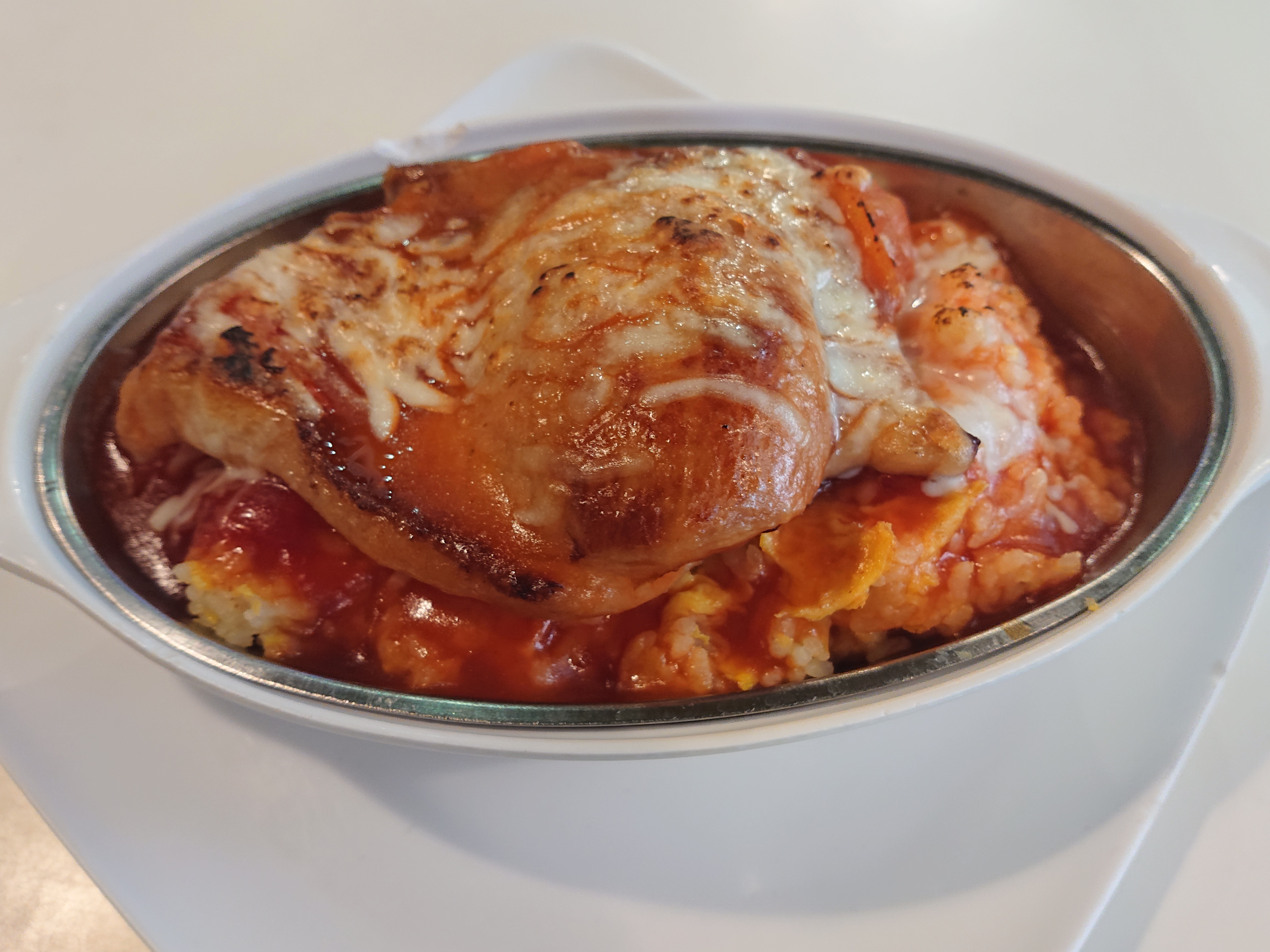
- Course: Main course
- Place of origin: Hong Kong
- Region or state: Hong Kong
- Associated cuisine: Hong Kong cuisine, Chinese cuisine
- Main ingredients: Rice, pork chops, tomato sauce, cheese

Baked pork chop rice (Chinese: 焗豬扒飯) is a Hong Kong-style Western dish. It is commonly served in cha chaan teng (茶餐廳). The dish combines Eastern and Western culinary influences. It consists of a base of fried rice with egg, which is topped with tomato sauce and cheese. This is then baked until the cheese is melted and then served.

== Origin ==
The original dish was based on French cuisine, namely the casserole. One of the first restaurants to serve this dish is Tai Ping Koon Restaurant, which served the dish when it was founded in 1860, and then moved to Hong Kong in 1938. Since then, many other restaurants in Hong Kong began to serve baked pork chop rice and it has become a staple comfort food.

== Ingredients and preparation ==
The dish consists of four main components :

- Pork chops: Tender pork chops are marinated and pan-fried.
- Egg fried rice: A bed of egg fried rice serves as the base of the dish.
- Tomato sauce: A rich, savory tomato sauce is poured over the pork chops.
- Cheese: The dish is topped with a generous amount of cheese, typically mozzarella, which is melted under the broiler.

The preparation involves marinating the pork chops in a mixture of seasonings including salt, sugar, chicken bouillon powder, pepper, Shaoxing wine, sesame oil, and light soy sauce. The marinated pork chops are then coated in a light batter and pan-fried. Meanwhile, egg fried rice is prepared and placed in a baking dish as the first layer. The fried pork chops are laid on top of the rice, followed by tomato sauce. Cheese is then added on top, and the entire dish is baked until the cheese is melted and the dish is hot.

== Cultural significance and popularity ==
Baked pork chop rice is a symbol of Hong Kong's unique cultural identity. It utilizes both Western and Chinese cooking styles and condiments, embodies the city's East-meets-West ethos and shows how Western influences have made an impact in Hong Kong cuisine. Being one of the most popular foods in Hong Kong, it can be found in almost every corner of the city.

== See also ==
- Cuisine of Hong Kong
- Comfort food
- Doria (food), a baked rice casserole in Japanese Western cuisine
