= Galinha à africana =

Macanese chicken dish

Chinese name
- Traditional Chinese: 非洲雞
- Simplified Chinese: 非洲鸡
Transcriptions
Standard Mandarin
- Hanyu Pinyin: Fēizhōu Jī
Yue: Cantonese
- Jyutping: fei1 zau1 gai1

Portuguese name
- Portuguese: galinha à africana

African chicken (traditional Chinese: 非洲雞; simplified Chinese: 非洲鸡), also known as galinha à africana (Portuguese: [ɡɐˈlĩɲaafɾiˈkɐ̃nɐ], is a Macanese chicken dish.

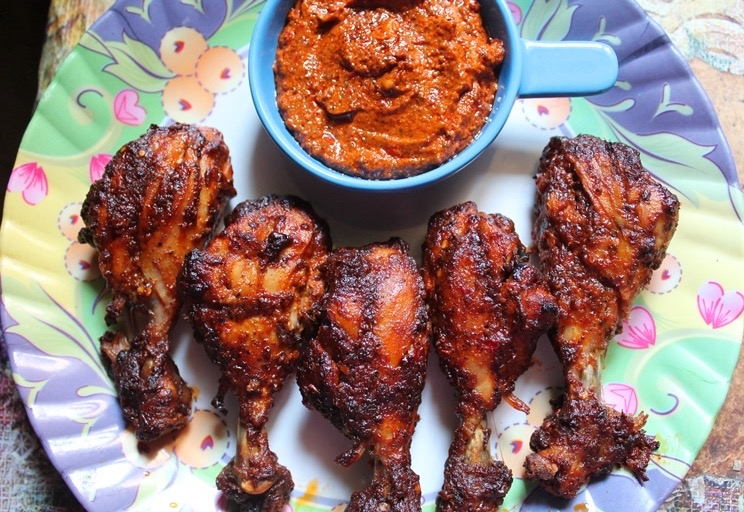
African chicken

African chicken consists of a grilled or roasted chicken coated with spicy piri piri sauce, which sometimes includes Asian ingredients. The dish — sometimes considered a renowned Macanese dish — is considered a variant of piri piri chicken.

There are many theories on the origins of African chicken, but all invariably attribute the dish to Macau's Portuguese colonial past. One theory is that the dish is the brainchild of local chef Américo Ângelo, who in the 1940s tried out spices he obtained from a trip to Portugal's African colonies. Another claims that the recipe has been passed down through Portuguese families in Macau for centuries. Yet another states that the recipe was brought to Macau by Portuguese Army officers who had served in the African colonies, who then retired and stayed in Macau in the aftermath of the Carnation Revolution. These officers opened cafés and served foods they came to like during their service in Africa.

== See also ==
- List of chicken dishes
