= Portuguese sauce =

Sauce featured in Macanese cuisine

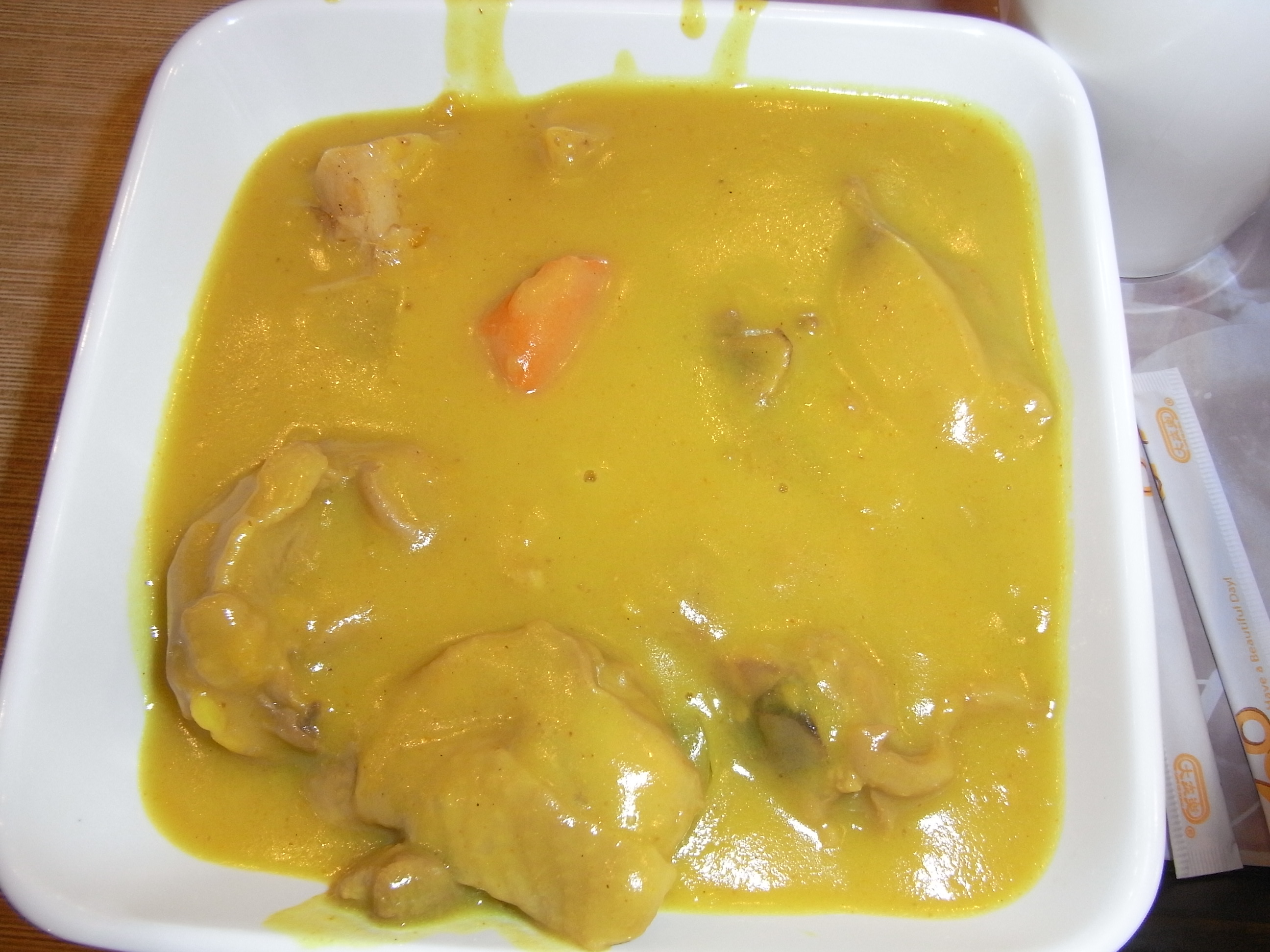
- A plate of Galinha à portuguesa, which uses Portuguese sauce
- Type: Curry
- Place of origin: Macau
- Main ingredients: Curry powder, coconut milk

Portuguese sauce
- Chinese: 葡汁
- Literal meaning: Portugal sauce
Transcriptions
Standard Mandarin
- Hanyu Pinyin: pu2 zhi1
Yue: Cantonese
- Jyutping: pou4 zap1

Portuguese sauce (Chinese: 葡汁, Portuguese: Molho português, Portuguese pronunciation: [ˈmoʎu puɾtuˈɣeʃ]) is a sauce in Macanese cuisine. The sauce is flavored with curry and thickened with coconut milk. It is an ingredient in Galinha à portuguesa, known as Portuguese Chicken in English-speaking societies.

The Portuguese sauce from Macao is considered to be a legacy of Portugal's colonization of Daman and Diu in India, and is likened to a mild yellow curry.

Despite its name, Portuguese sauce (along with Galinha à portuguesa) is a Macanese cuisine invention, and is not a sauce used in Portuguese cuisine.
