= Doutor (footballer) =

Brazilian footballer

Personal information
- Full name: Pedro Octávio de Camargo Penteado
- Date of birth: 29 June 1917
- Place of birth: Campinas, Brazil
- Date of death: 30 May 2001 (aged 83)
- Place of death: Porto Feliz, Brazil
- Position: Goalkeeper

Youth career
- Cesário Mota
- Voluntários da Pátria

Senior career*
Years	Team	Apps	(Gls)
1939–1940	Mogiana		
1941	Ypiranga-SP		
1941	→ Flamengo (loan)	3	(0)
1941–1944	São Paulo	39	(0)
1945	Descalvadense		
1946	Comercial-SP		
- * Club domestic league appearances and goals as of 7 November 2025

Pedro Octávio de Camargo Penteado (29 June 1917 – 30 May 2001), better known as Doutor, was a Brazilian professional footballer who played as goalkeeper.

== Career ==
Originally from Campinas, Penteado began his career playing in the Liga Campineira, the amateur league of city, for the Cesário Mota and Voluntários da Pátria teams. In 1937 he abandoned his career after being accepted into the medical course at the Faculty of Medicine in Rio de Janeiro. In 1939 he ended up returning to his hometown and resumed playing for EC Mogiana. He ended up earning the nickname "Doctor" precisely for that reason.

With a standout performance for Mogiana, he was signed by CA Ypiranga in 1941, becoming the club's starting goalkeeper in the São Paulo state championship. He was loaned to Flamengo at the end of the year and played three matches for the club. In 1942, he was acquired by São Paulo FC, but failed to establish himself, making only 39 appearances. In the last two years of his career, he played for Descalvadense and Comercial de São Paulo.

== Honours ==
São Paulo

- Campeonato Paulista: 1943
