= Tacho (food) =

Dish from Macau

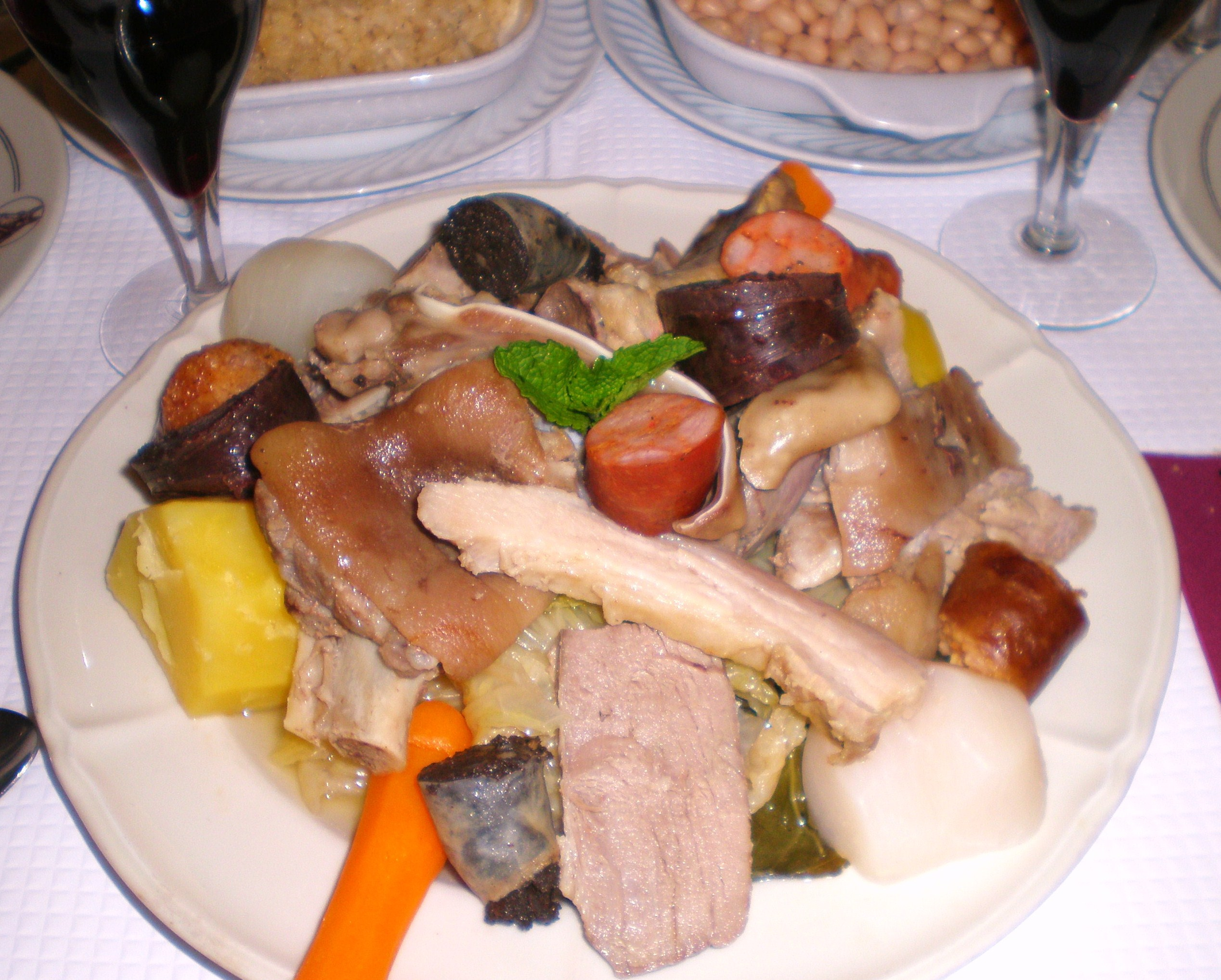
Cozido, a dish very similar to tacho

Tacho (meaning pot or pan), also known as Chau-Chau Pele, is a type of meat and vegetable stew or casserole of Macanese cuisine that is a local variant of cozido à Portuguesa, found in Portuguese cuisine, which heavily influenced Macanese cuisine during colonization. Its preparation and serving is similar to a pot-au-feu or boiled dinner.

== History ==
Tacho is considered to be a winter dish, and can take up to three days to prepare. It is often eaten during the holidays, and symbolizes familial unity.

At least one account states that Tacho began as a dish made with leftover ingredients from holiday feasts.

In the past, Tacho was seen as a dish consumed by wealthy people. It is considered to be a relatively rare dish, even in the present day.

== Description, ingredients and preparation ==
The dish consists of meats and vegetables simmered together for a long period, sometimes several days.

The dish has both Portuguese and Cantonese influences. It evolved from cozido à Portuguesa, but many of the substitutions were to Cantonese ingredients. Even though there are variations depending on recipes, tacho is, in general, noted to have swapped the chouriços that is found in cozido with Chinese sausage, and the turnips found in cozido with daikon. Some tachos include pork rind, pig's trotters, and balichão. One recipe also calls for the use of fish maw. Often cabbage is an ingredient.
