= Minchee =

Macanese dish

- Minchee with rice

Chinese name
- Chinese: 免治
- Jyutping: min zi
Transcriptions
Standard Mandarin
- Hanyu Pinyin: miǎnzhì
Yue: Cantonese
- Jyutping: min zi
- IPA: [mi̬ːnt͡sìː]

Portuguese name
- Portuguese: Minchi

Minchee, or minchi, is a Macanese dish based on minced or ground meat stir-fried with vegetables and seasoned. It is widely considered Macau's national dish.

Minchee is an example of fusion food. Macanese cuisine is a fusion of Cantonese, Portuguese, South American, Malay, African, and Indian flavors. While recipes vary, the dish is generally based on minced or ground meat. It is made with beef or pork with onions, cubed potatoes, and sometimes mushrooms, slightly stir-fried, and flavoured with Worcestershire sauce, molasses and soy sauce. When served with a fried egg on top it is called minchee chow dan. (Chinese: 免治炒蛋).

== Importance ==
It is according to The Splendid Table "one of the most prized dishes of Macau and has as many variations as there are cooks that make it." According to Vice it is "one dish that's emblematic of the dizzying cultural melting pot that is Macau" and is "widely regarded as the national dish". It is a dish traditionally served in homes; typically every home cook has their own recipe.

The Portuguese families in Macau, a tight-knit community, developed their own unique culture, patois (patuá) and fusion cuisine and called themselves "Macaense" or in English "Macanese".

== Etymology ==
The term minchi came relatively late into Macanese vocabulary. After the founding of Hong Kong in 1841 many Macanese sought residency there, settling at the mid-level bairro (district) of Mato-de-Mouro. In time as English became more entrenched in daily conversation, Minchi – from the English "to mince" – replaced Kheema to describe this savory culinary staple of the Macanese people.

== History ==
According to The Splendid Table, this suggests "the dish may have been introduced to Macau by the Anglophone community in Hong Kong, though other histories place its origins in Goa, another Portuguese province."

The odyssey of minchi starts with kheema, the term used by many Indians for finely minced meat usually of goat and lamb. When Portuguese seafarers arrived in India in 1498 they wanted to affirm and distinguish themselves as Christians. The cow is sacred to Hindu Indians who are proscribed from eating its flesh, so to proclaim their affirmation as Christians, Portuguese merchants and Christian converts made their kheema with beef as a designation of their faith.

In the 16th century, Malacca was the hub of the Maritime Spice Trade for sailing vessels converging from India, China, and South-east Asia. In 1511 Portuguese caravelas – relatively small but sturdy sailing vessels with broad bows, high poops, and lateen sails – arrived. The Portuguese promptly seized Malacca by force of arms and made it their trading settlement. They discovered that Chinese merchants from Fujian province had already pre-dated their arrival by many decades. Knowing that the eating of pork is forbidden to Muslims and following upon the principle established in Hindu India of relating dietary choice to religious and ethnic designation, pork was substituted for beef in the Kheema dishes eaten by Christians in Malacca.

In succeeding decades Portuguese traders and their mestizo and misturado crew of Fujianese, Malaccans, Ceylonese, Indians, Burmese, Thai, Cambodians and Vietnamese sailed out of Malacca and some South-east Asian trading ports for the coast of China. This came along with different tastes, smells, cooking styles, ingredients and new crops that would define Macanese cuisine.

Portuguese traders maintained seasonal temporary settlements along the China coast. By 1543 Portuguese traders aboard a Chinese junk arrived at Kagoshima, the most southerly port in Kyushu, Japan.

In 1557, local Chinese authorities permitted the traders, many of them Lusodescendentes (of Portuguese descent) to establish a permanent settlement at a small peninsula on the western edge of the Pearl River estuary. Thus was born A Cidade do Sacrado Nome de Deus na China (the City of the Holy Name of God in China).

The opening of the Japan Trade soon followed in the mid-1560s. Japanese elites at Kagoshima and Nagasaki desired rare Chinese silks, gold, spices, and exotic European products such as woolens, clocks, firearms, and Western curios. In return Chinese merchants at Guangchow (Canton) wanted Japanese silver. Macau served as the intermediary port between China and Japan.

The Jesuits, scholars all, produced the first Japanese–Portuguese dictionary. More important for us, they translated the first haute cuisine cookbooks used by the elites of Goa and Macau into Japanese. The Japanese elites enthusiastically embraced this introduced cuisine. The Macanese pork Kheema of that time became the Japanese Donburi, which to this day is served "with minced pork and egg over rice". Our porco pó bolacho (crumbed pork cutlets) became their Tonkatsu. Tempura and Teriyaki dishes have Macanese beginnings. The Portuguese Pão-de-Ló transformed into their refined Castela Cake.

The Kurofune voyages made Macau one of the wealthiest places in the world for that time. This wealth allowed the Jesuits to build, with Japanese artisans, the most imposing church east of Goa, A Igreja de Madre de Deus (the Church of the Mother of God), and the seminary of Colégio de São Paulo (St Paul's College), and the noted contemplative retreat of hilltop Monte. Macau was indeed a Catholic city. Direct Portuguese administration was nominal and limited and subsumed to the standing Capitão-Mor (Captain-General) of the Kurofune voyages supported by the Provincial head of the Jesuit Order resident at Macau.
