= Doutor Coffee =

Japanese coffee shop brand

Doutor Coffee Co., Ltd.

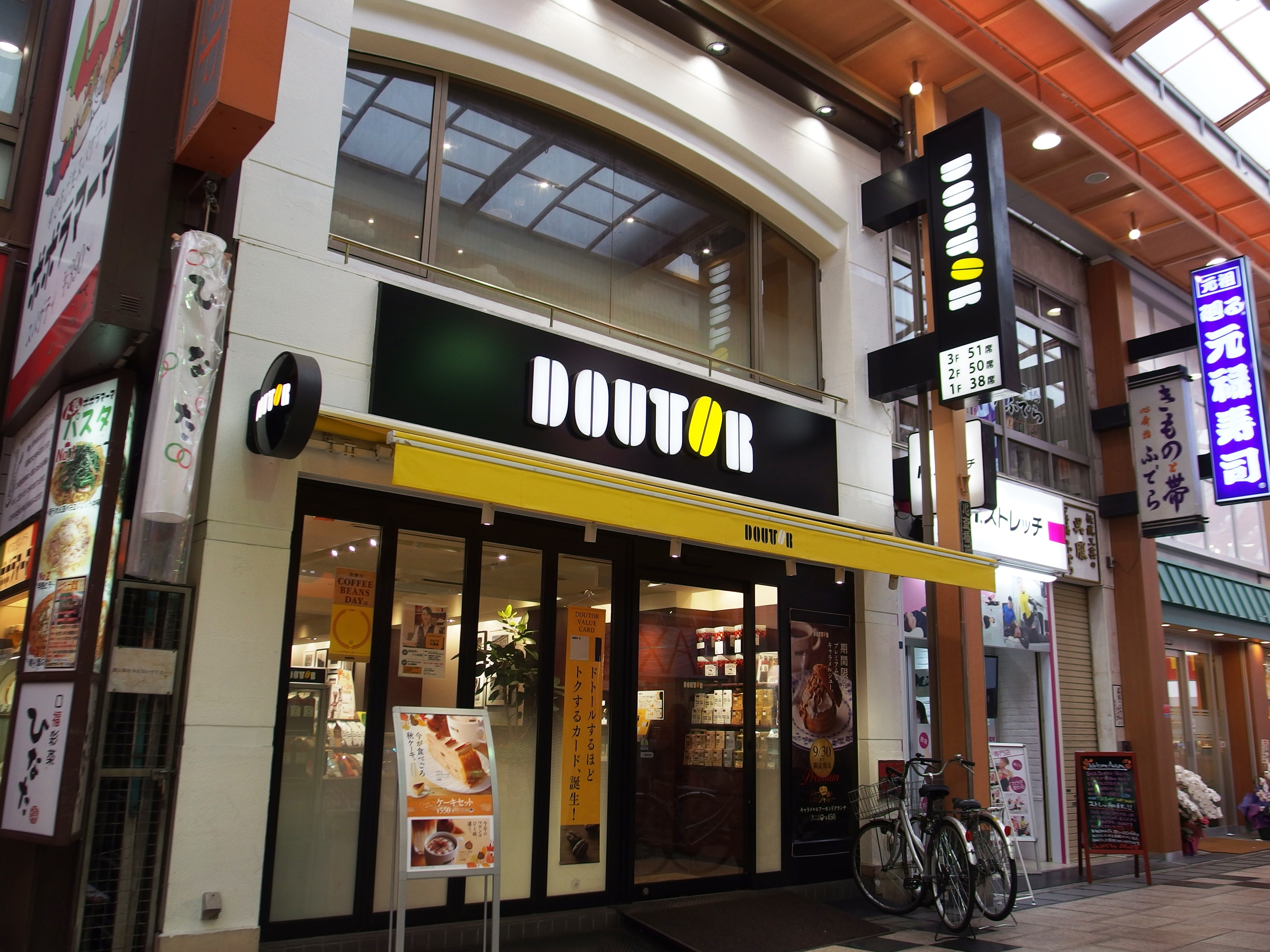
- Doutor Coffee shop
- Native name: 株式会社ドトールコーヒー
- Romanized name: Kabushikigaisha dotōrukōhī
- Company type: Public company
- Traded as: TYO: 3087
- Industry: Restaurants; Retail coffee and tea Retail beverages
- Founded: 1976; 50 years ago
- Founder: Toriba Hiromichi (鳥羽博道)
- Headquarters: Shibuya-ku, Tokyo, Japan
- Area served: Japan, South Korea, Taiwan, Malaysia, Singapore
- Key people: Toriba Yutaka (鳥羽豊)
- Products: Whole bean coffee Made-to-order beverages
- Services: Coffee
- Website: www.doutor.co.jp

Doutor Coffee (Japanese: 株式会社ドトールコーヒー) is a Japanese retail company that specializes in coffee roasting and coffee shop franchising. It was founded by Toriba Hiromichi.

== Information ==
The company currently has over 900 locations in Japan, has begun expansion in Taiwan and most recently, in Malaysia and Singapore. It is listed on the Tokyo Stock Exchange. Doutor Coffee has over 1,200 outlets altogether.

Doutor Coffee is described by Bloomberg as appealing to "Old Japan" with its low prices and smoker-friendly environment compared to its competitor Starbucks.

== History ==
Doutor Coffee opened the first European styled café in Harajuku, Japan on 18 April 1980. The size of the small shop was only nine square meters. Despite the small size and local competition, the Doutor Coffee shop succeeded and has expanded to the company that it is now.

Doutor Coffee opened its own coffee plantation in 1991, in Kona District, Hawaii. It opened a second plantation in 1995. It opened a more casual coffeehouse chain, Excelsior Caffé, in 1999.

As of 2002 financial year, Doutor Coffee had 1,222 stores.

== Roasting coffee ==
Roasting coffee using hot air is a commonly used method by most roasting plants, but Doutor says it "takes away the original flavor of the coffee" and explored other ways to roast the coffee. They found open flame roasting their preferred method and ended up researching and developing its own industrial open flame roaster to roast its coffee.

== See also ==
- List of coffeehouse chains
