= Galinha à portuguesa =

Chicken dish from Macau

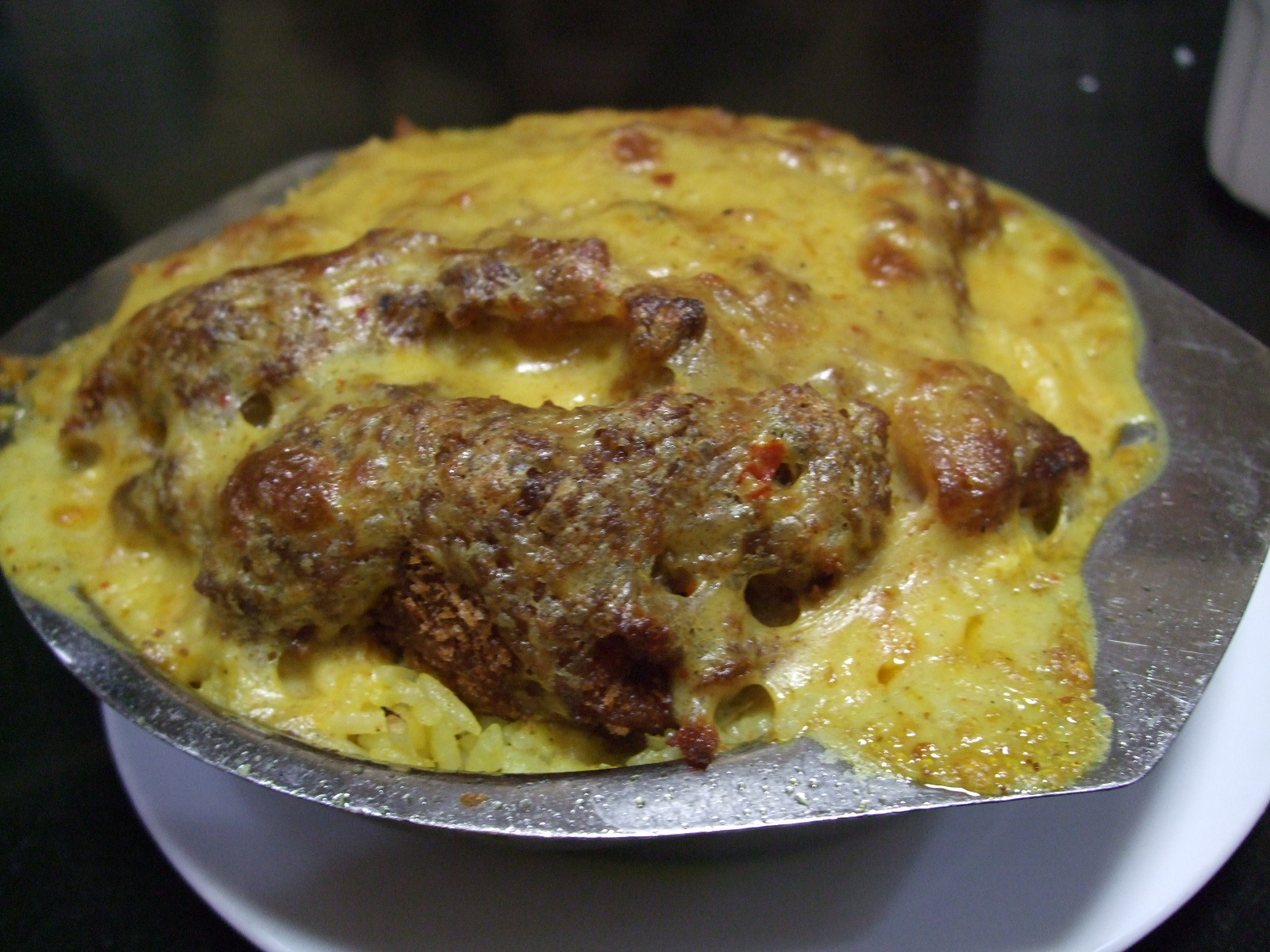
- Place of origin: Portuguese Macau
- Invented: Between 16th century and 18th century
- Main ingredients: chicken potato
- Ingredients generally used: rice Portuguese sauce

Portuguese chicken (traditional Chinese: 葡國雞; simplified Chinese: 葡国鸡), also known as Portuguese-style chicken or galinha à portuguesa (Portuguese pronunciation: [ɡɐˈlĩɲaapuɾtuˈɣezɐ]) is a dish found in Macanese cuisine.

Despite its name, Portuguese chicken did not originate from Portugal, but from its former colony Macau. The dish is not found in Portuguese cuisine.

The dish consists of chicken pieces served with Portuguese sauce, which is likened to a mild yellow curry thickened with coconut milk.

== See also ==
- List of chicken dishes
- Macanese cuisine
