= Tai Ping Koon Restaurant =

Restaurant in Hong Kong

- Traditional Chinese: 太平館餐廳
- Simplified Chinese: 太平馆餐厅
Transcriptions
Standard Mandarin
- Hanyu Pinyin: Tàipíng Guǎn Cāntīng
Yue: Cantonese
- Jyutping: taai3 ping4 gun2 caan1 teng1

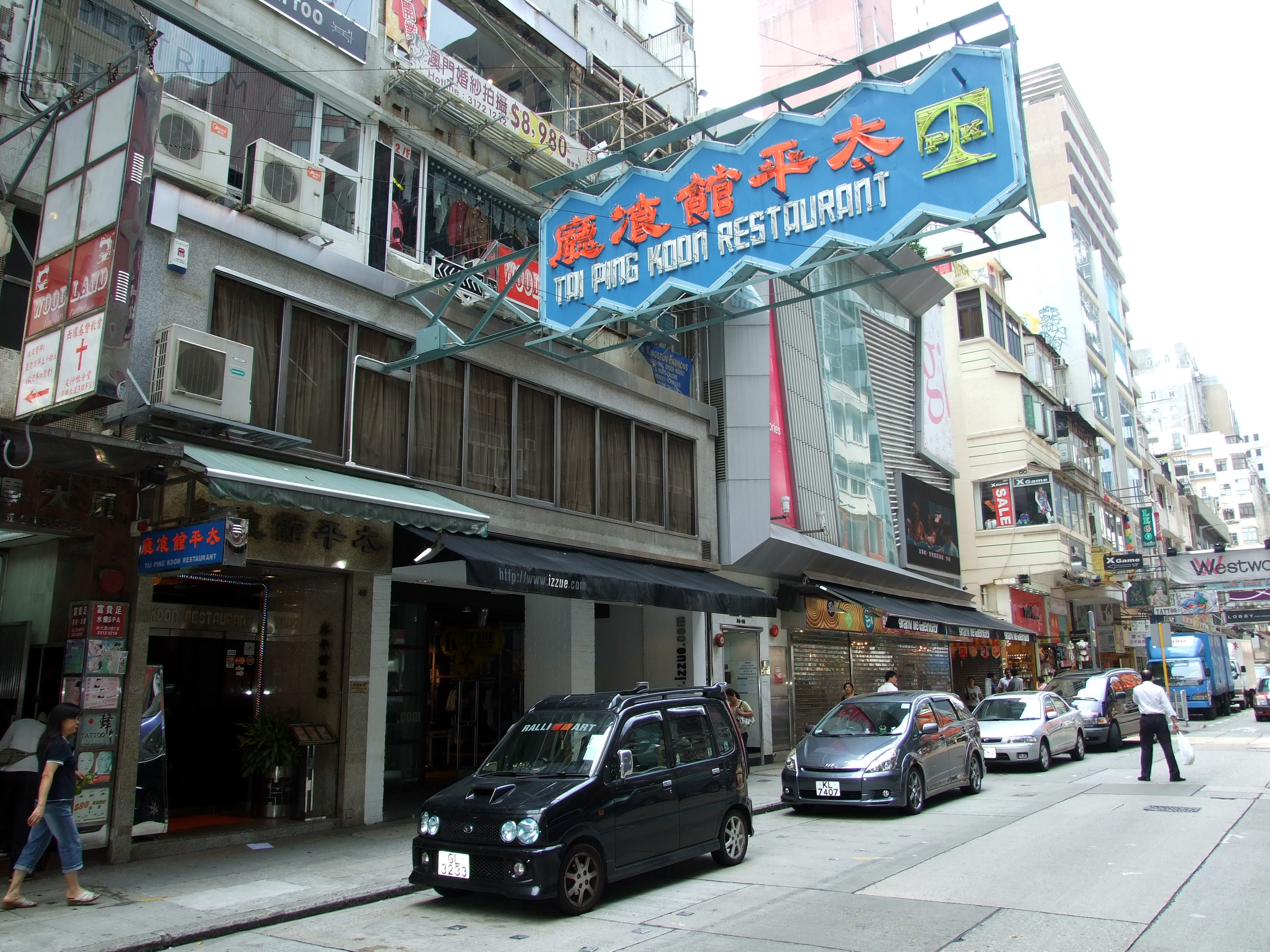
Tai Ping Koon Restaurant in Granville Road, Tsim Sha Tsui, Kowloon.

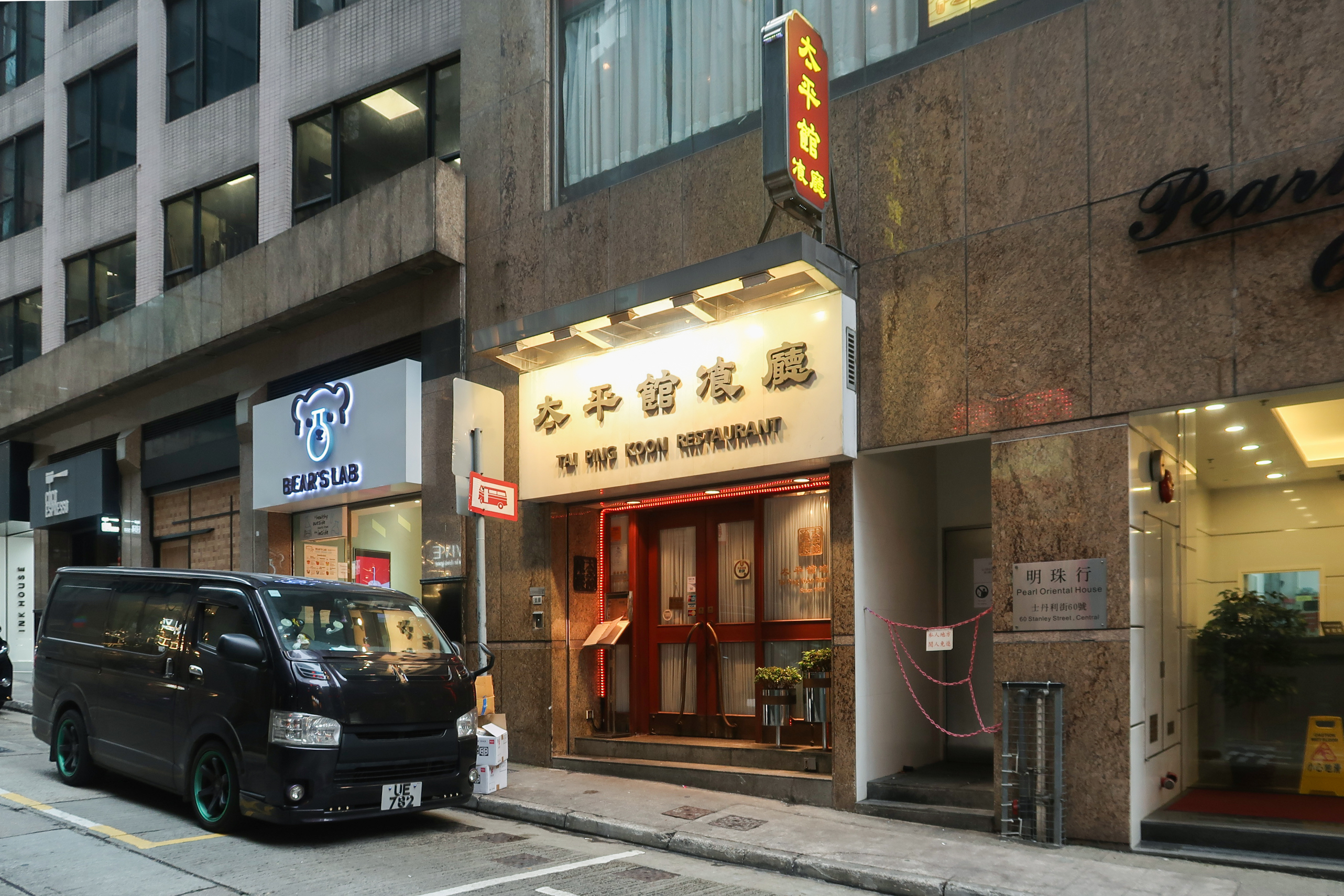
Tai Ping Koon Restaurant in Central, Hong Kong.

Tai Ping Koon Restaurant (TPK, Chinese: 太平館餐廳) is a restaurant in Hong Kong, with four branches located in said region in 2018. Chris Dwyer of the South China Morning Post described it as "one of the world’s oldest continually operating Chinese restaurants".

== History ==
Chui Lo Ko (Chinese: 徐老高) established it in 1860 as a restaurant serving Western cuisine, modified to suit the tastes of Chinese customers, in Canton (Guangzhou). Dwyer stated that it had a reputation as "a fine-dining restaurant" with famous people as customers. The Canton location occupied a four-storey facility.

The first Hong Kong location opened in Sheung Wan in 1938. It became a solely Hong Kong franchise when the Canton location closed in 1956, as the Chinese government confiscated private property.

In Guangzhou, there is currently the Taiping Guan Restaurant. Dongjiang Restaurants began running the restaurant in 2003.

In 2016, it had restaurants in Central, Causeway Bay, and Kowloon, which were four in total.

Sun Yat-sen, Chiang Kai-shek, Chow Yun-fat, and Ho Chi Minh ate at least one of the outlets of Tai Ping Koon. Zhou Enlai and Deng Yingchao held their wedding reception at the Guangzhou location in 1925, and the restaurant continued to advertise the menu served at that event as of 2020. HK Magazine in 2016 ranked it as #8 of "Hong Kong's 10 Most Iconic Restaurants".

== Cuisine ==
Its dishes became known as "Soy Sauce Western" as soy sauce is a key ingredient. The restaurant states that the dish Swiss wings originated from there. As of 2016, in all of the TPK restaurants, Swiss wings are the most common item among customers, and Dwyer stated that Swiss wings are "Arguably [Tai Ping Koon's] most famous dish."
