= Balichão =

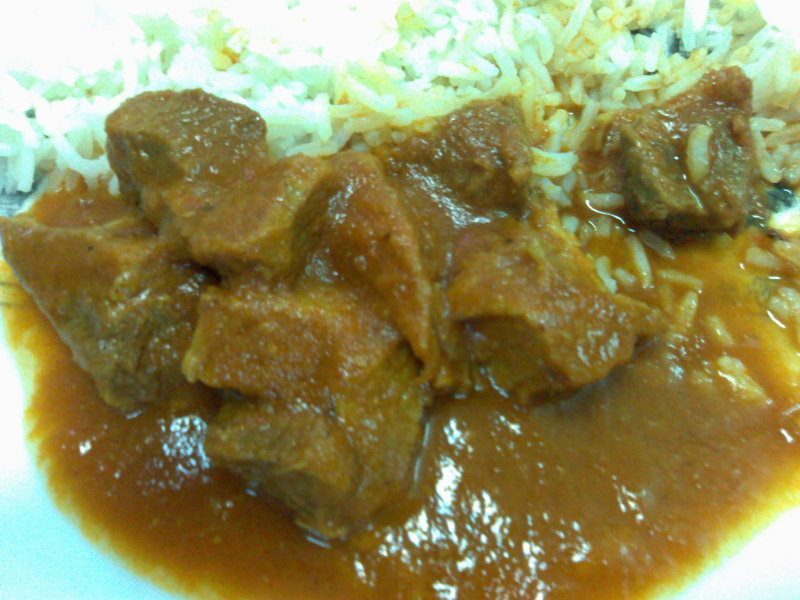
Balchão de porco

Balichão (Cantonese: 鹹蝦醬, haam^{4} haa^{1} zoeng^{3}, "salt shrimp sauce") is an ingredient that is used in a number of dishes in Macanese cuisine. It is made with shrimp, alcohol, salt, pepper, bay leaves and malagueta chillies.

== Characteristics ==
Despite being commonly described as a shrimp paste, some sources state balichão is actually made with krill. Some describe Balichão as a fish sauce.

Balichão is noted for having a distinct odor that some find foul. Some, however, find balichão's smell and taste milder and mellower than shrimp pastes from Southeast Asia.

== History ==
There are at least two theories on where the word balichão originated. One theory states the word is believed to have evolved from the Portuguese word for Whale (baleia). Another theory states the word is a corruption of the word belachang, which is one of a number of Malay words for shrimp paste.

Balichão is noted as originating from shrimp pastes that were brought to Macao by Portuguese sailors who discovered it during their voyage to the city, and later developed by locals as a special variant.

Balichãos are noted to have a tradition of being home made, and can take up to a month to mature.

In 2009, Balichão is described as an almost extinct condiment, as people look for its substitute among other, more readily available ingredients.

== Ingredients ==
Besides krill, Balichão contains bay leaves, chili, clove, lime, peppercorn, and is laced with fortified wine.

== Culture ==
Balichão is noted to be so central to Macanese culture, that Macanese people call themselves balichung as an affectionate demonym. There is also a street named after balichão in Macao, named Travessa do Balichão (Chinese: 鹹蝦巷).
