= Doria (food) =

Japanese dish

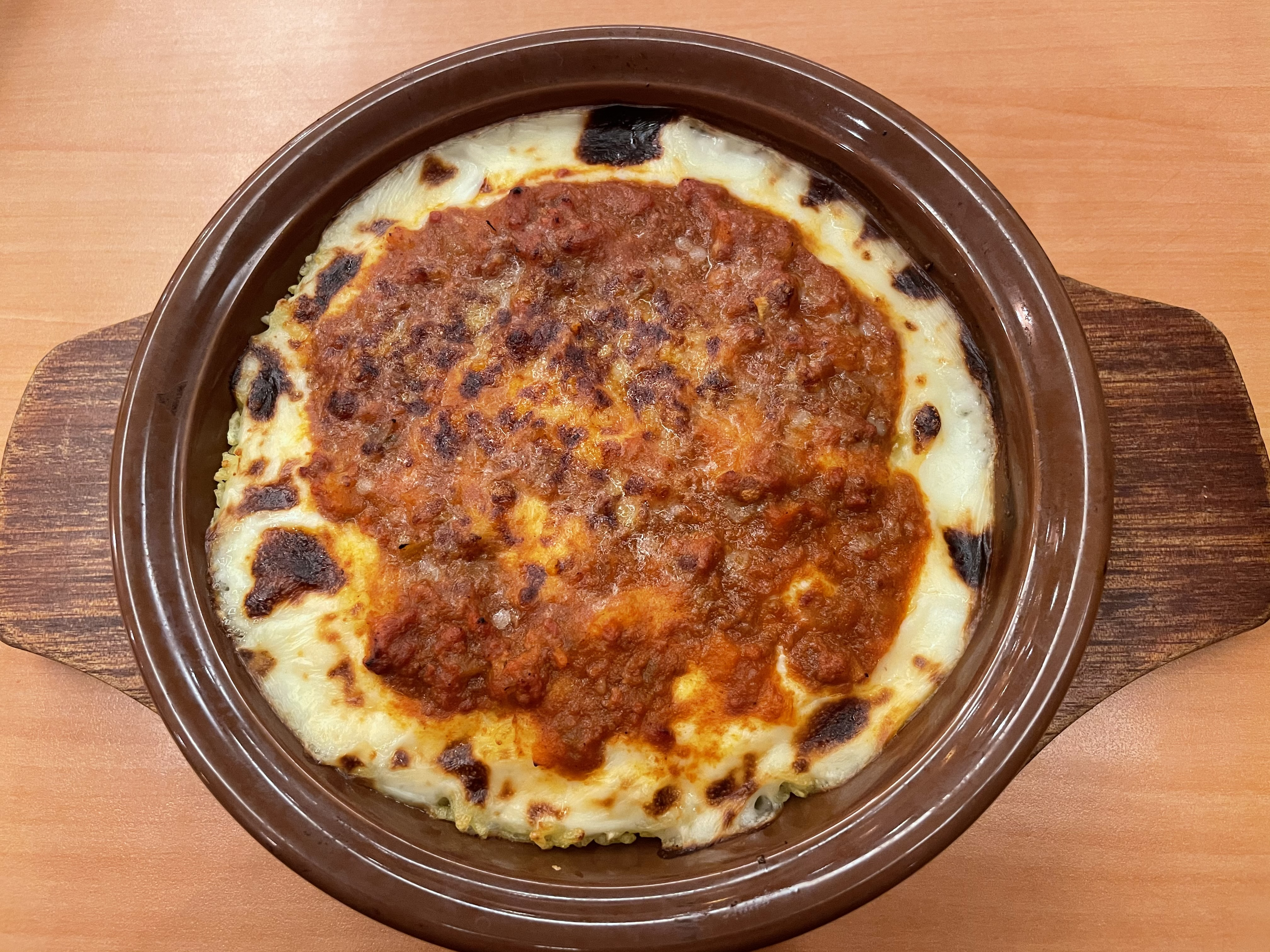
- A gratin dish of beef doria
- Type: Gratin
- Place of origin: Japan
- Region or state: Yokohama
- Created by: Saly Weil
- Serving temperature: Hot
- Main ingredients: Béchamel, rice, cheese

Doria (ドリア, doria) is a type of rice gratin popular in Japan. Cooked white rice is topped with sautéed meat, such as chicken or shrimp, and vegetables, then topped with a béchamel sauce and cheese, and baked as a casserole. Doria is an example of yōshoku, Western food tailored to Japanese tastes.

== History ==
Created during the Shōwa era, doria was originally improvised in the 1930s by Saly Weil, the first grand chef at the Hotel New Grand in Yokohama prefecture. A patron had reportedly requested a dish that was easy to swallow, as they had been feeling sick that day, which prompted Weil to create a soft, comforting dish which required little chewing: cream-stewed shrimp over buttered rice, topped with cheese.

After its conception, the dish gained popularity as a menu item, and eventually became a signature dish of the hotel, under the name "Shrimp Doria". Weil's disciples spread the dish to various restaurants and hotels around Japan in the following decades, cementing doria's place in Japanese culture. The dish is still served at the Hotel New Grand, along with other dishes the hotel claims to have invented, such as spaghetti naporitan and pudding à la mode.

Today, there are multiple variations to doria. Any assortment of vegetables, meat, or seafood may be used, and the rice can be buttered, fried, or in a pilaf. Curry doria is a popular variation, which includes Japanese curry either in the rice or in the sauce on top. It is a staple yōshoku dish in modern Japan, being served in Western restaurants throughout the country.

== Name ==
Several theories exist as to the origin of the name "Doria", though none are officially confirmed. The most widespread theory claims the dish was named after 16th century naval admiral Andrea Doria, who was a member of the prestigious Doria family of Genoa, Italy.

== See also ==
- Baked pork chop rice, a baked rice casserole in Hong Kong-style Western cuisine
- Yōshoku
