= Macanese cuisine =

Culinary traditions of Macanese people

Chinese name
- Traditional Chinese: 澳門土生葡菜
- Simplified Chinese: 澳门土生葡菜
Transcriptions
Standard Mandarin
- Hanyu Pinyin: Àomén Tǔshēng Púcài
Yue: Cantonese
- Jyutping: ou3 mun4*2 tou2 saang1 pou4 coi3

Portuguese name
- Portuguese: Culinária macaense

Macanese cuisine (Chinese: 澳門土生葡菜, Portuguese: culinária macaense) is mainly influenced by Chinese cuisine, especially Cantonese cuisine, and European cuisine, predominantly Portuguese cuisine, and influences from Southeast Asia and the Lusophone world, due to Macau's past as a Portuguese colony and long history of being an international tourist gambling centre.

It is an early example of a fusion cuisine and dates to the 16th century.

== Dishes ==
Minchi, egg tarts, pork chop buns, ginger milk and almond cakes are some of the region's most common delicacies. Common cooking methods make use of various spices such as turmeric, coconut milk, and cinnamon to give dishes an extra kick of aroma and enhancement of taste. Many routinely consumed dishes in Macau belong to a subclass (Heungshan) of Cantonese cuisine. Many Macanese dishes resulted from the spice blends that the wives of Portuguese sailors used in an attempt to replicate European dishes with local Chinese ingredients and seasonings.

Typically, Macanese food is seasoned with various spices including turmeric, coconut milk, and cinnamon, and dried cod (bacalhau), giving special aromas and tastes. Popular dishes include galinha à Portuguesa, galinha à Africana (African chicken), bacalhau (traditional Portuguese salt cod), pato de cabidela, Macanese chili shrimps, minchi, stir-fried curry crab; pig's ear and papaya salad, and rabbit stewed in wine, cinnamon and star anise.

== Cha Gordo ==
Cha Gordo (literally "Fat Tea") is a culinary tradition amongst the Macanese community in Macau that is likened to afternoon tea. Historically, families with Portuguese heritage in Macau would host a Cha Gordo for a number of occasions, including Catholic holidays, christening, or birthdays, but they can be held for any reason. Historically, some families would even host one on a weekly basis. A Cha Gordo would take place following a Macanese wedding, instead of the elaborate banquet seen in Chinese weddings.

== Macanese dishes and desserts ==
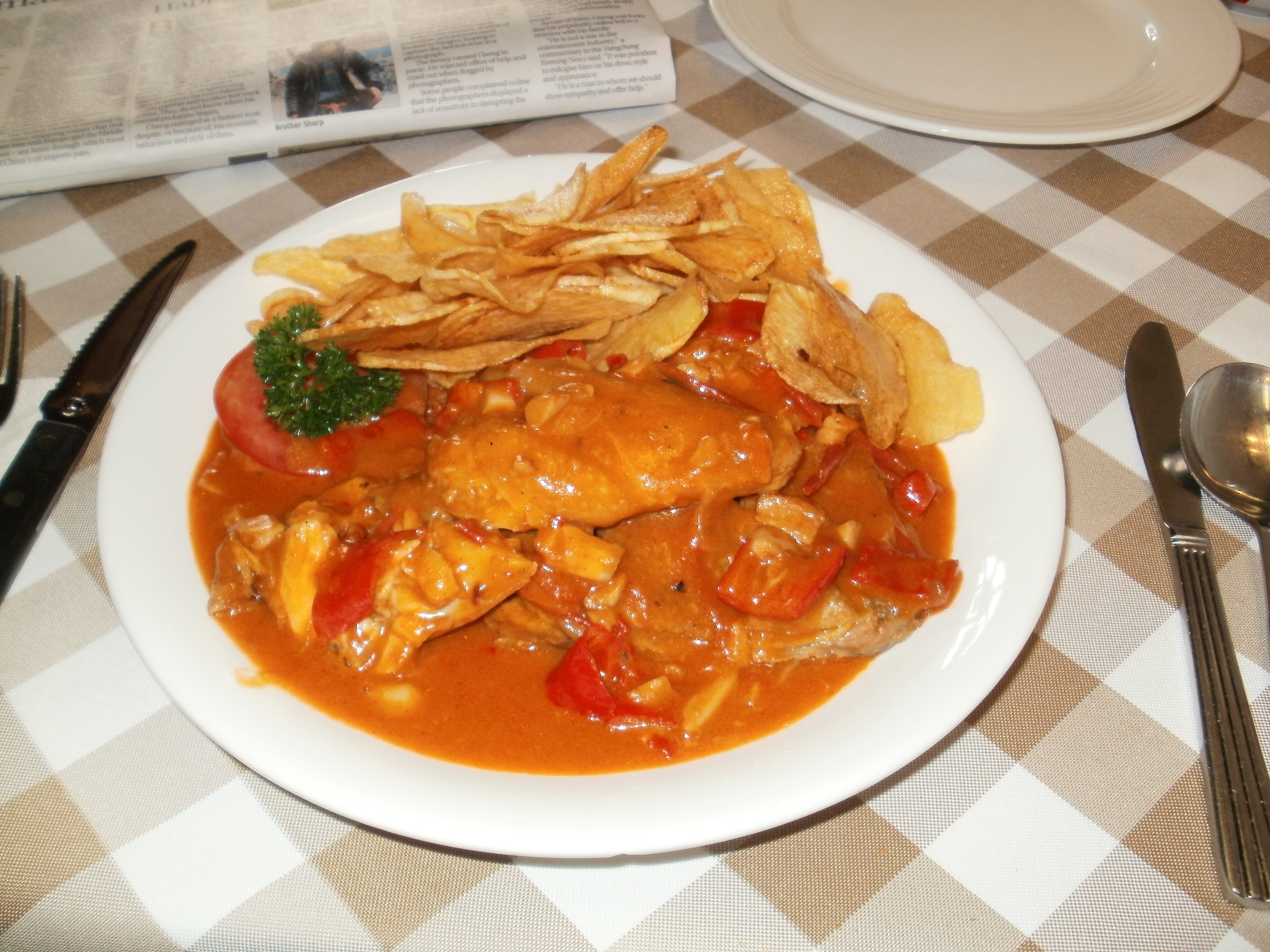
Galinha à Africana

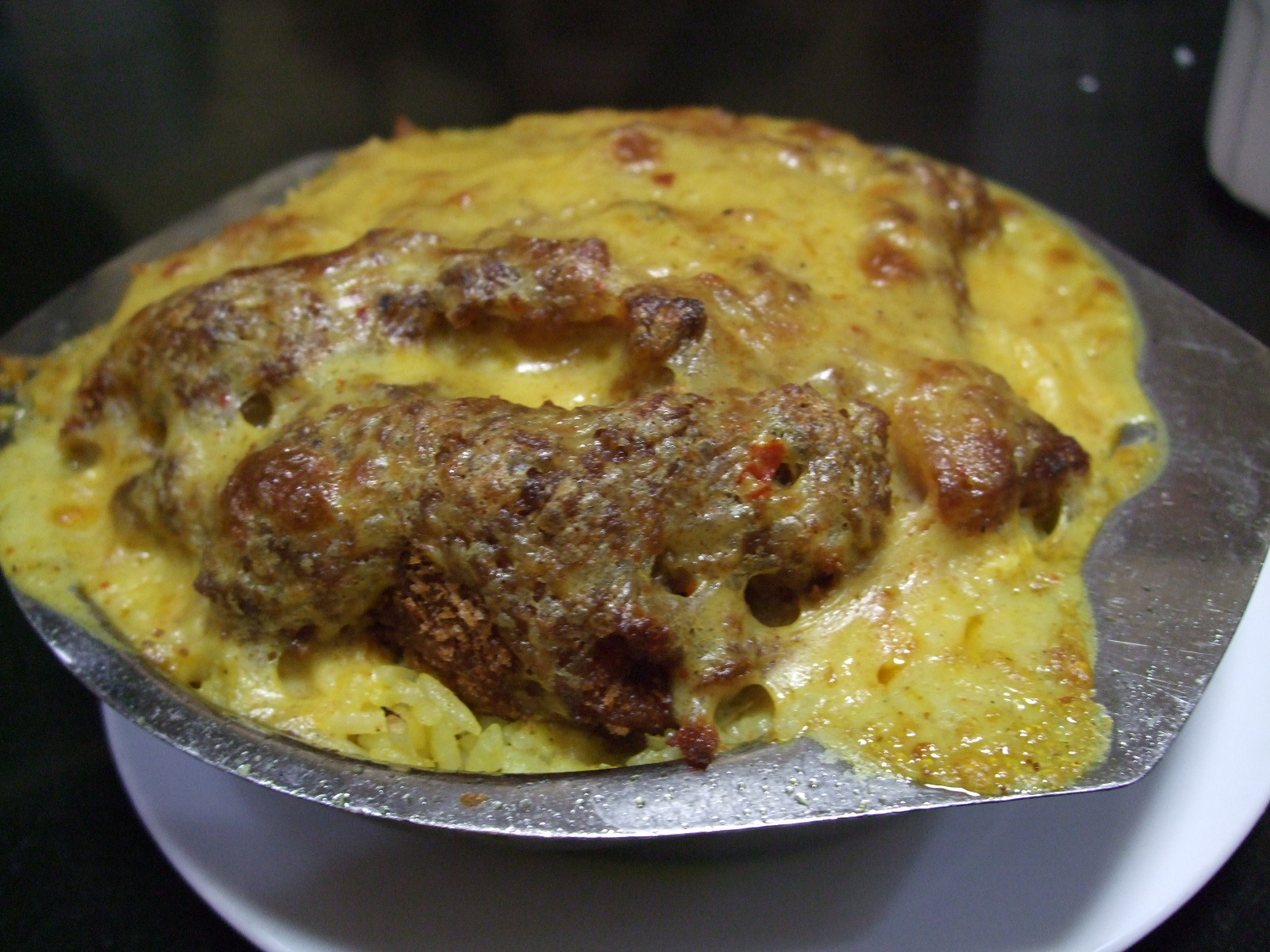
Galinha à Portuguesa

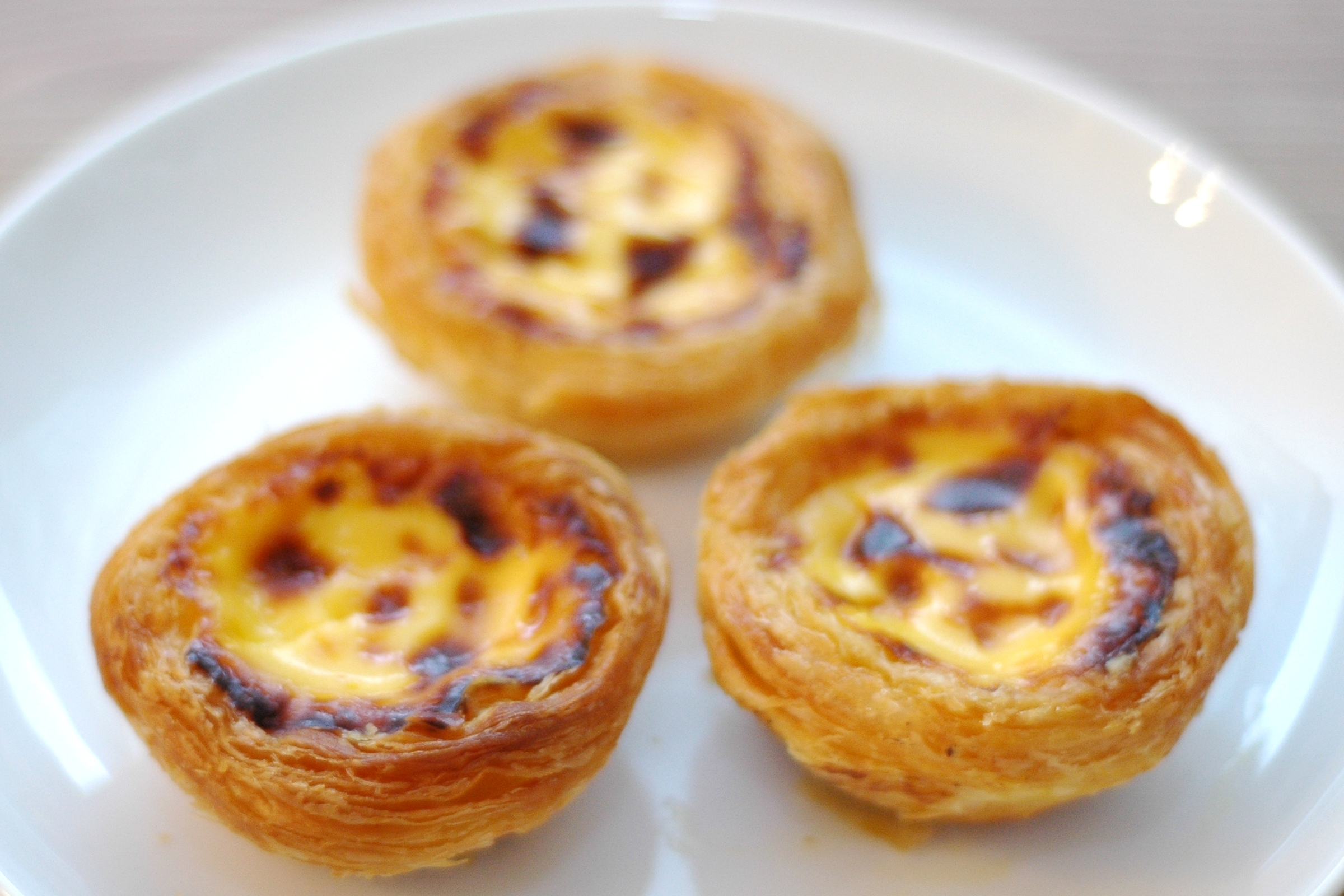
Pastéis de nata

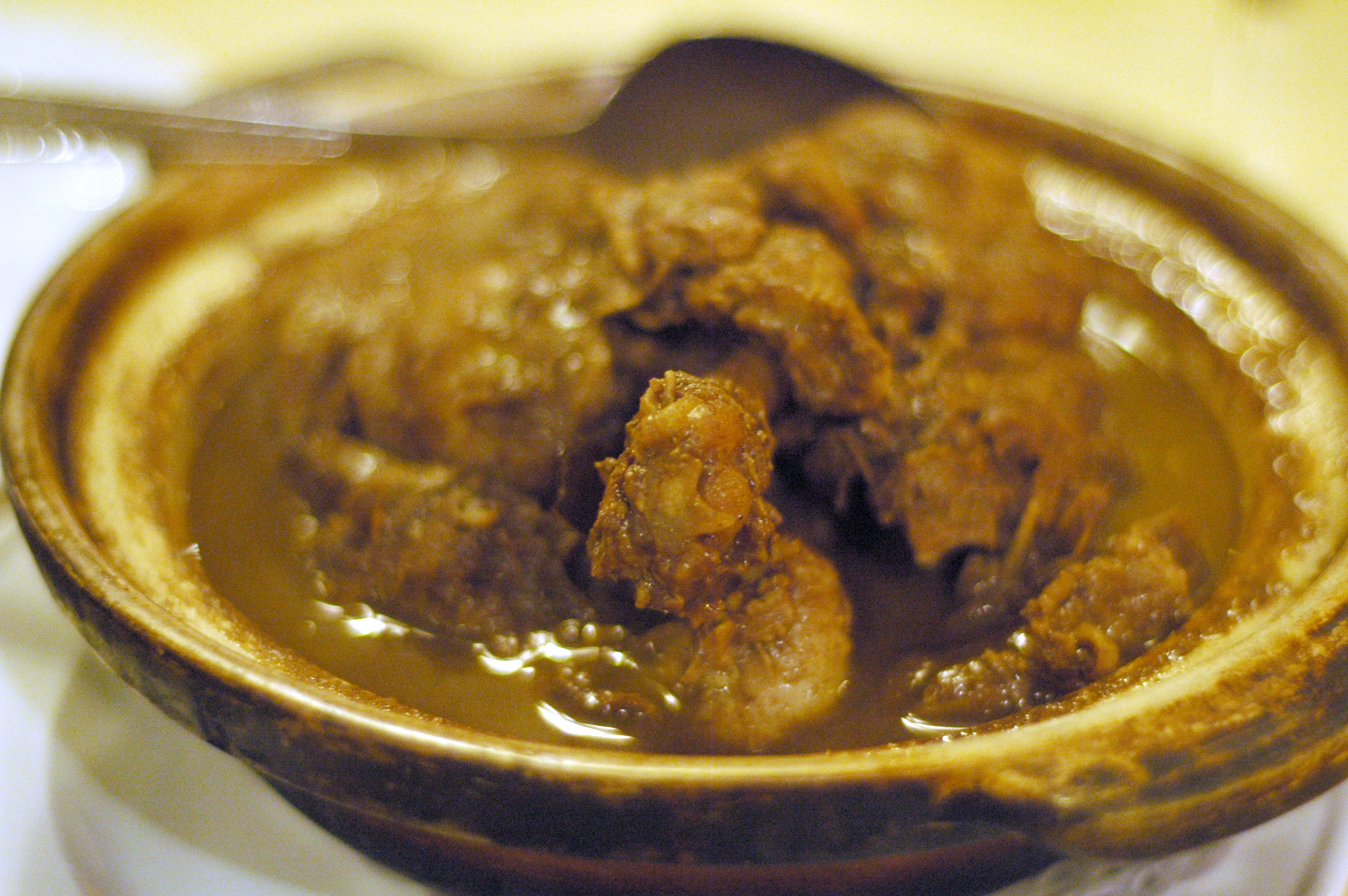
Pato de cabidela

Minchi

== Non-Macanese Macau snacks ==
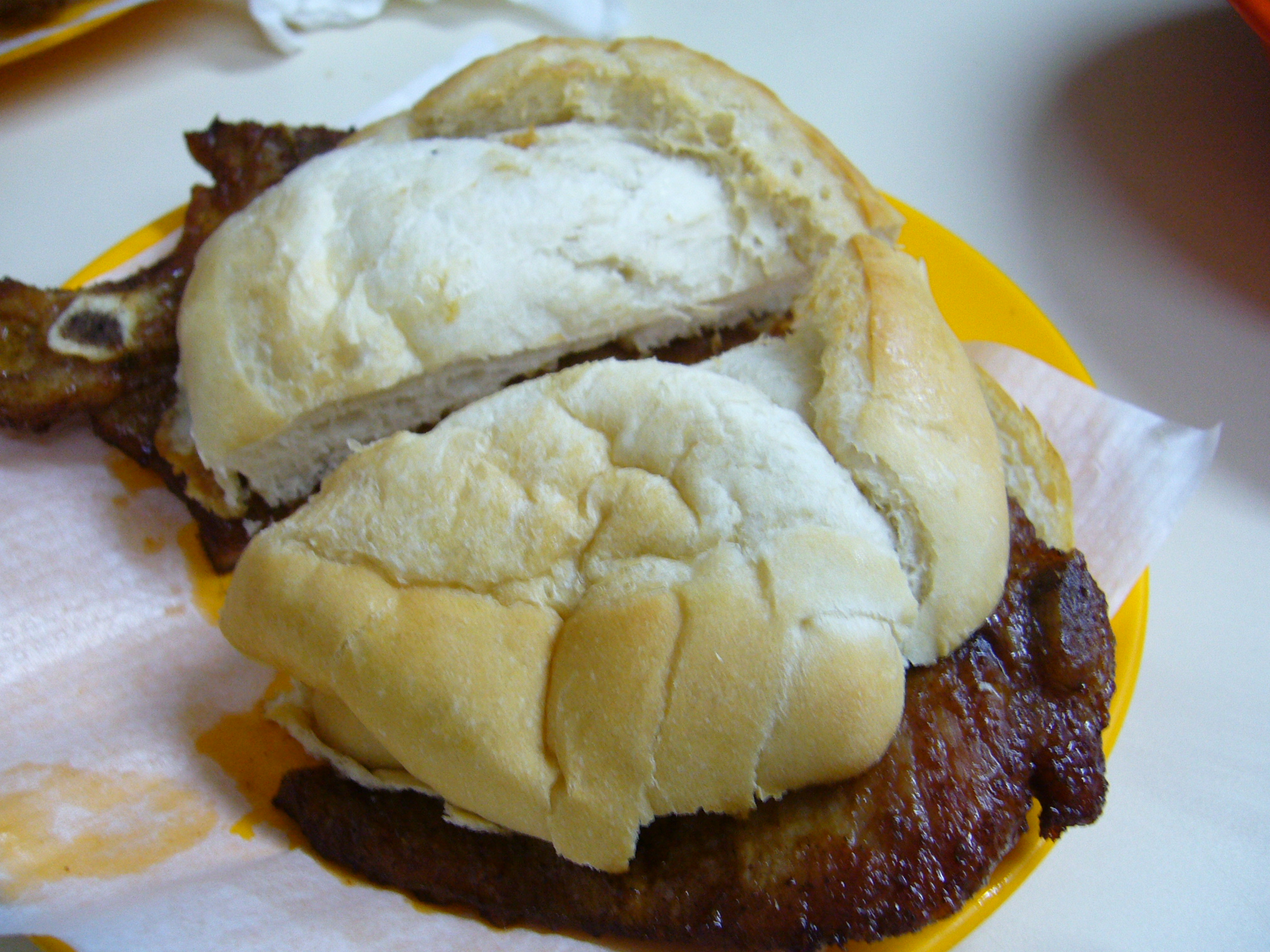
Pork chop bun

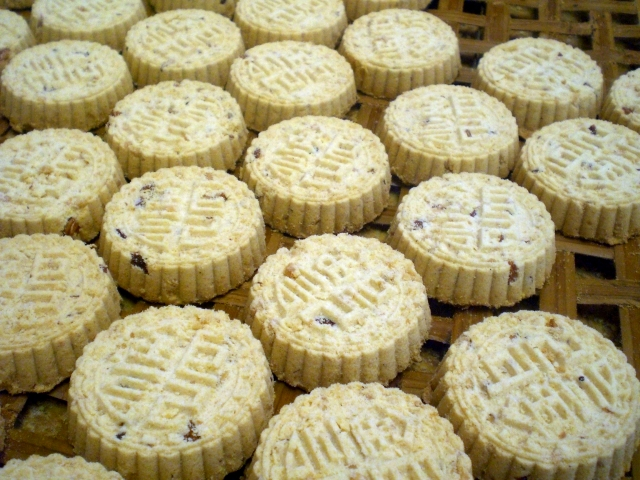
Apricot kernel biscuit

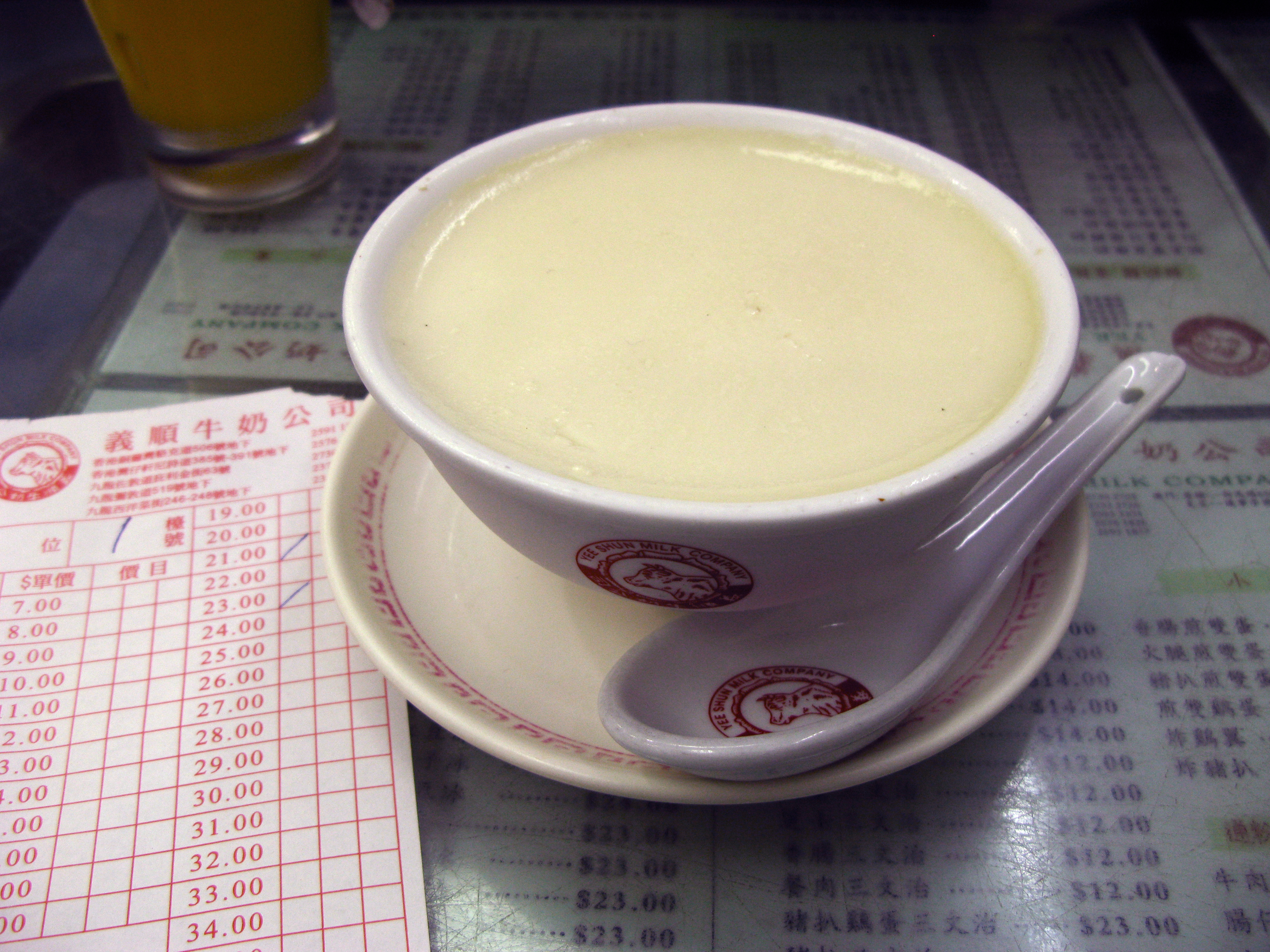
The Macau ginger milk curd resembles this Hong Kong ginger milk curd.

== See also ==
- Cantonese cuisine
- History of Macau
- Hong Kong cuisine
- List of Chinese dishes

== Select bibliography ==
- Ferreira Lamas, João António (1995). A culinária dos macaenses. Oporto: Lello & Irmão.
- Gomes, Maria Margarida (1984). A cozinha macaense. Macau: Imprensa Nacional.
- Senna, Maria Celestina de Mello e (1998). Cozinha de Macau. Lisbon: Vega ISBN 972-699-575-2
