= Fusion cuisine =

Food combining multiple culinary traditions

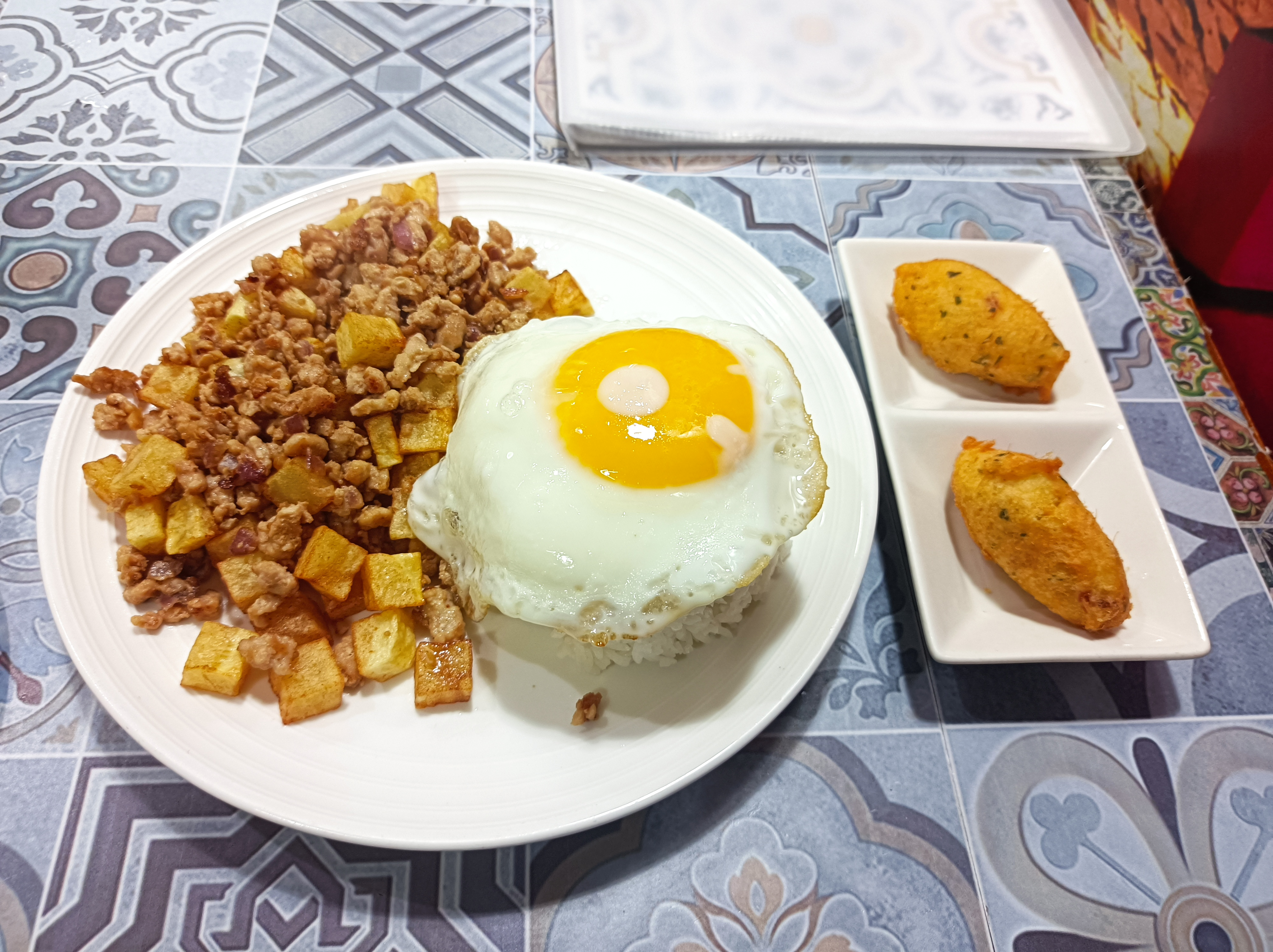
Macanese cuisine with a plate of minchi with rice and a fried egg on top to the left, often regarded as Macau's unofficial national dish. Served with a common Portuguese side dish, known as pastéis de bacalhau to the right.

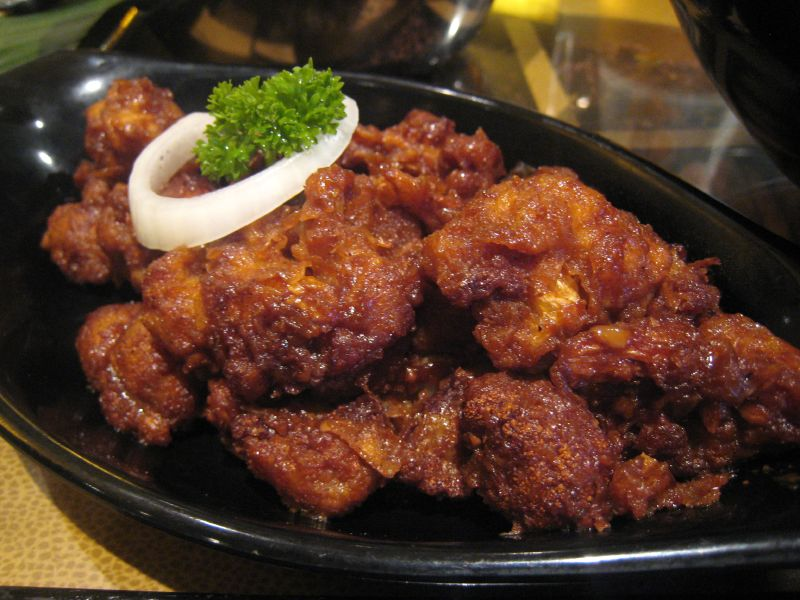
Gobi Manchurian is an Indian–Chinese fusion dish, consisting of fried cauliflower. The dish is popular throughout India and Indian restaurants as well as South Asian restaurants around the world.

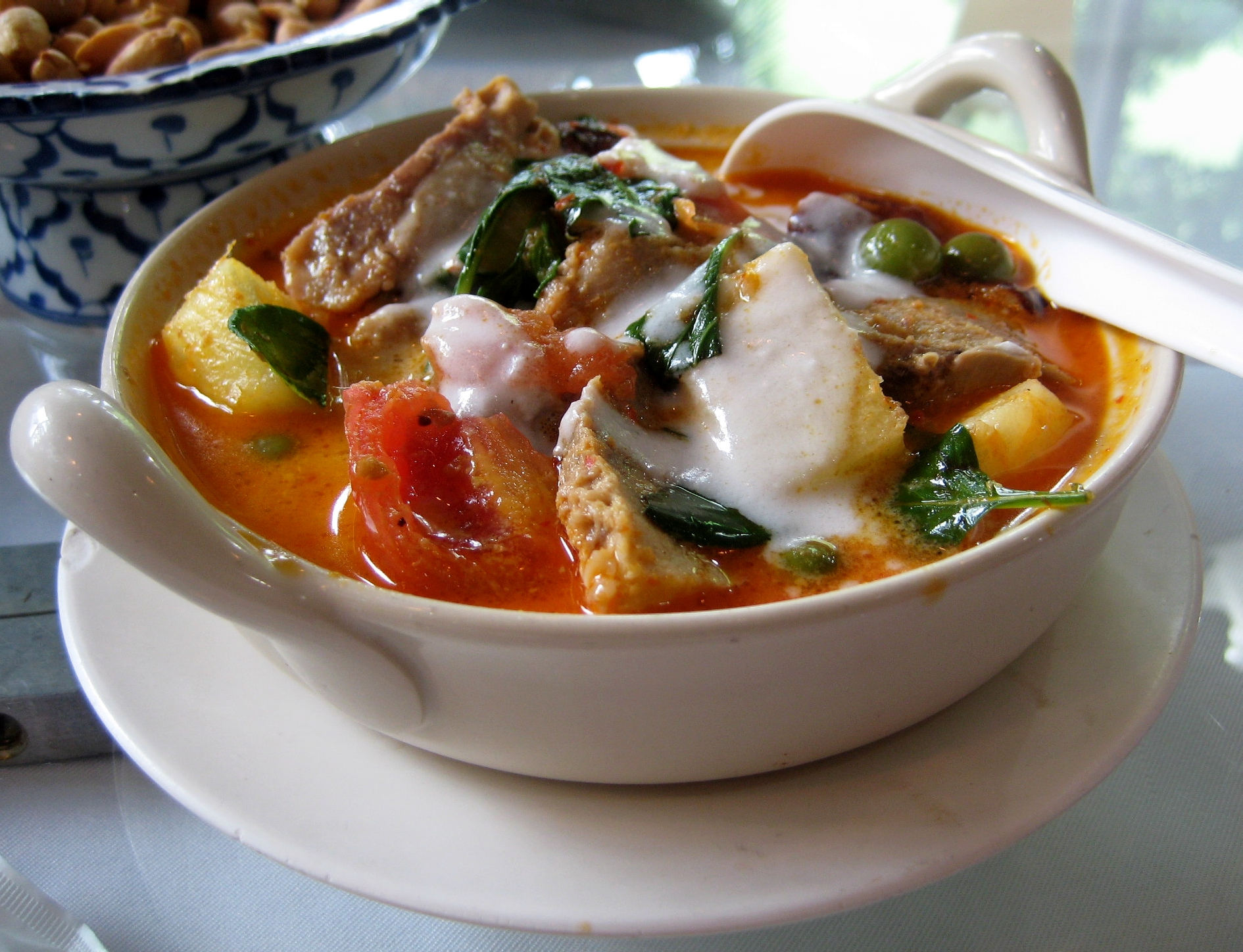
Kaeng phet pet yang (Thai roast duck curry) is an example of early fusion cuisine of the cosmopolitan court of the Ayutthaya Kingdom, combining Thai red curry, Chinese roast duck, and grapes originally from Persia.

Fusion cuisine is a cuisine that combines elements of different culinary traditions that originate from different countries, regions, or cultures. Cuisines of this type are not categorized according to any one particular cuisine style and have played a part in many contemporary restaurant cuisines since the 1970s.

The term fusion cuisine, added to the Oxford English Dictionary in 2002, is defined as "a style of cookery which blends ingredients and methods of preparation from different countries, regions, or ethnic groups; food cooked in this style."

== History ==
Fusion cuisine has existed for millennia as a form of cross-cultural exchange, though the term was only defined in the late 1900s. Mixtures of different cultures' cuisines have been adapted since the 16th century.

Recognised by UNESCO, the world's first fusion food is titled to Macanese cuisine, born over 450 years ago. It blends Portuguese-style dishes with Chinese ingredients and techniques, alongside African, Indian and Southeast Asian flavours.

However, some argue that Greece is considered to be the very first example of fusion cuisine, as interactions from other various civilizations over time led to the incorporation of new foods and culinary traditions.

=== Colonialism ===
A lasting legacy of colonialism is fusion food. Colonial trade resulted in the exchange of ingredients, such as bánh mì originating from French ingredients used in French Indochina, Jamaican patties combining the turnover with spices and peppers from the British Empire's possessions in Asia and Africa, and ramen originating as shina soba or "Chinese noodle" from the Empire of Japan's occupation of China's island territories in the late 1800s and early 1900s. Indigenous domestic servants were active participants in creating fusion foods by mixing ingredients and techniques.

Alongside the creation of new dishes, colonialism also introduced class dimensions of food as cultural capital that modified consumption patterns. Indigenous practices of eating guinea pigs in Peru were banned and considered savage until recent movements to reclaim food practices, resulting in the erasure of much traditional knowledge in indigenous communities. These hierarchies are argued to be present in modern fusion food, which has been criticised for being portrayed as European cuisines 'elevating' other cuisines into modernity. Colonial debates also extend into discourse about the authenticity of foods such as orientalist critiques of immigrant food being gentrified as ‘ethnic’ food.

=== Adaptation to local palates ===
In a climate of increasing globalization, where cultures and cuisines frequently cross-borders, cooking and food evolves to cater to the palates of the local communities, a phenomenon known as "glocalization", a portmanteau of "localization" and "globalization".” Fusion cuisine is sometimes created by multinational restaurants, especially fast food chains. A primary example of this corporate globalized expansion is in the case of McDonald's regional menus which are adapted to "reflect different tastes and local traditions for every country in which we have restaurants". In addition to catering to the regional food traditions, McDonald's also takes an additional consideration for religious beliefs and laws, as seen in the absence of beef and pork items on Indian menus.

Beyond accounting for the cultural or religious differences in cuisine, some fusion foods have also been created to fit the taste preferences of local communities when ethnic or cultural foods from abroad were introduced. A hallmark example of this adaptation is in the popular sushi roll, the California roll, which was created in America in the latter half of the 20th century. A popular myth behind its composition containing crab, vegetables, and rice on the exterior cites the American aversion to foreign ingredients such as raw fish and seaweed.

These adjustments to foreign cuisines have both corporate and historical origins. In the example of McDonald's, the creation of regional menus can be seen as an economic choice to cater to the local palates and traditions. Another example of popularized fusion foods is the Korean stew budae-jjigae, which was created by combining American ingredients of Spam, Vienna sausages, and sliced cheese, in a kimchi stew in the wake of the Korean War during which American tastes and influence were prevalent in Korea.

=== Role of immigration ===
Immigrants play a significant role in shaping modern fusion cuisine. Food can often be a form of cultural expression that fosters a relationship with one's heritage, and fusion can emerge from creating foods from immigrant's adaptation of their own cultural food to the ingredients available in the host country or region. Immigrants may adapt the use of their cultural ingredients to local culinary traditions. For example, Vietnamese immigrants in the Southern United States used Vietnamese condiments in traditionally Creole cuisine, while adhering to Southern cooking methods. Similarly, the establishment of American Chinese cuisine has origins in Chinese-owned small businesses in American ghettos and Chinatowns, with many of these restaurants responsible for the adaptation of Chinese cuisine to American palettes.

Immigrants may also adapt their cultural flavors to the availability of ingredients in the host country: Indian-Chinese cuisine shaped by Chinese immigrants to British-ruled India often uses Indian spice and flavor profiles such as garam masala and turmeric. As such, immigrant-founded fusion cuisines also play a role in shaping food culture in the host country by introducing new flavors and ingredients.

Indian-Chinese cuisine is an example of how gradual migration and exchange across shared international borders contributes to fusion cuisine. Similar cases are Sino-Korean food emerging from Chinese diasporas in Korea and shared borders between Korea and Northeastern China, and Mexican-American cuisine influenced by Mexican immigration to the Southwest United States that combines Mexican, Native American, and European flavors.

The convergence of two or more immigrant groups in a different host country can also lead to the emergence of fusion cuisines. Chinese and Latin American immigrants to the United States have collaboratively founded fusion restaurants, serving dishes such as Chinese dumplings filled with traditional slow-roasted pork from the Yucatàn Peninsula. In the United States, Asian fusion cuisine can constitute pan-Asian multi-ethnic ingredients such as rice, leading to a newfound form of "American" Asian food unfound in Asia. One popular example of pan-Asian fusion food found in North America is the rice bowl, often with ingredients commonly used together in Asia such as garlic with chili, stir-fried vegetables with tofu. This illustrates the dynamic process between fusion food and its relationship with intercultural solidarity, influenced by both local and other immigrant cultures.

=== Modern fusion food ===
Japanese cooking techniques were combined with French techniques in 1970s France to create nouvelle cuisine.

Wolfgang Puck is attributed as one of the pioneers of fusion cuisine, with some dispute. However, his restaurant Chinois on Main was named after the term attributed to Richard Wing, who in the 1960s combined French and Chinese cooking at the former Imperial Dynasty restaurant in Hanford, California.

Chef Norman Van Aken was the first person to use the term "fusion cooking" as he delivered a speech at a symposium in Santa Fe in 1988. Soon journalist Regina Schrambling wrote about Van Aken's work and the term spread around the globe. Norman Van Aken ended his speech by discussing the history of fusion cuisine, such as the use of coffee in Italian cuisine. Van Aken related this to coffee being used in different desserts such as Calabrian ricotta with chocolate mousse.

== Categories ==
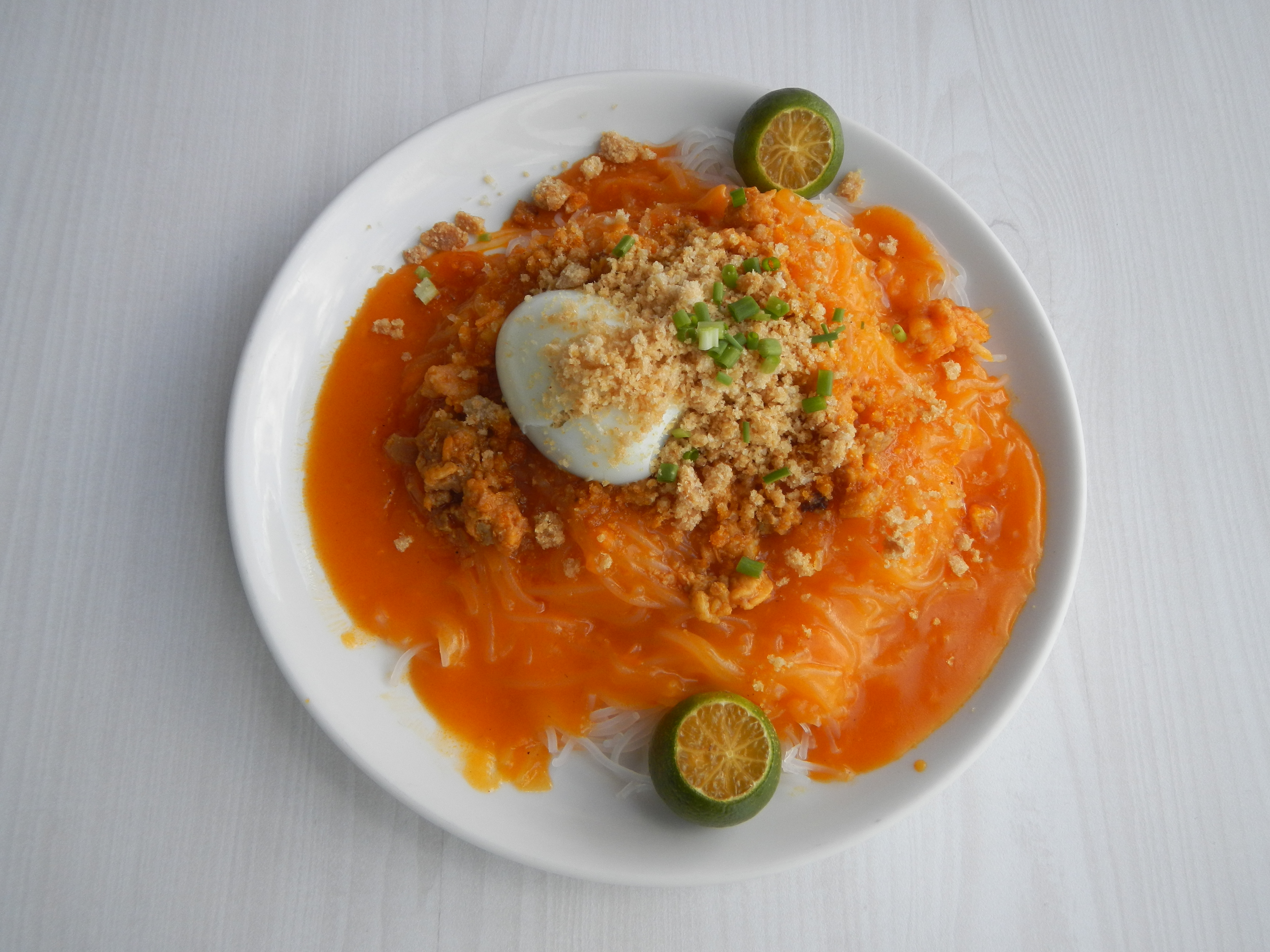
Pancit palabok in Filipino cuisine, combines rice noodles and tofu from China with native smoked fish flakes in a shrimp sauce dyed bright orange with annatto seeds from Mexico and garnished with crushed chicharon from Spain. It is served spritzed with native calamansi.

Fusion food is created by combining various cooking techniques from different cultures to produce a new type of cuisine. Although it is commonly invented by chefs, fusion cuisine can occur naturally. Cuisines which get fused can either come from a particular region (such as East Asian cuisine and European cuisine), sub-region (such as Southwestern American cuisine and New Mexican cuisine) or a country (such as Chinese cuisine, Japanese cuisine, Korean cuisine, French cuisine, Italian cuisine).

Asian fusion restaurants which combine the various cuisines of different Asian countries have become popular in many parts of the United States, United Kingdom, and Australia. Often featured are East Asian, Southeast Asian, and South Asian dishes alongside one another and offering dishes that are inspired combinations of such cuisines. California cuisine is considered a fusion culture, taking inspiration particularly from Italy, France, Mexico, the idea of the European delicatessen, and East Asia, and then creating traditional dishes from these cultures with non-traditional ingredients – such as California pizza. In Australia, due to immigration, fusion cuisine is being reinvented and is becoming increasingly the norm at numerous cafes and restaurants, with Asian-fusion restaurants like Tetsuya's in Sydney ranking highly in The World's 50 Best Restaurants.

In the United Kingdom, fish and chips can be seen as an early fusion dish due to its marrying of ingredients stemming from Jewish, French, and Belgian cuisines.

Filipino cuisine is sometimes characterized as the "original Asian fusion cuisine", combining native culinary traditions and ingredients with the very different cuisines of China, Spain, Malaysia, Thailand and Mongolia, among others, due to its unique colonial history. Food in Malaysia (also Indonesia) is another example of fusion cuisine which blends Malay, Javanese, Chinese, and Indian and light influences from Thai, Portuguese, Dutch, and British cuisines. Oceanic cuisine combines the different cuisines of the various island nations.

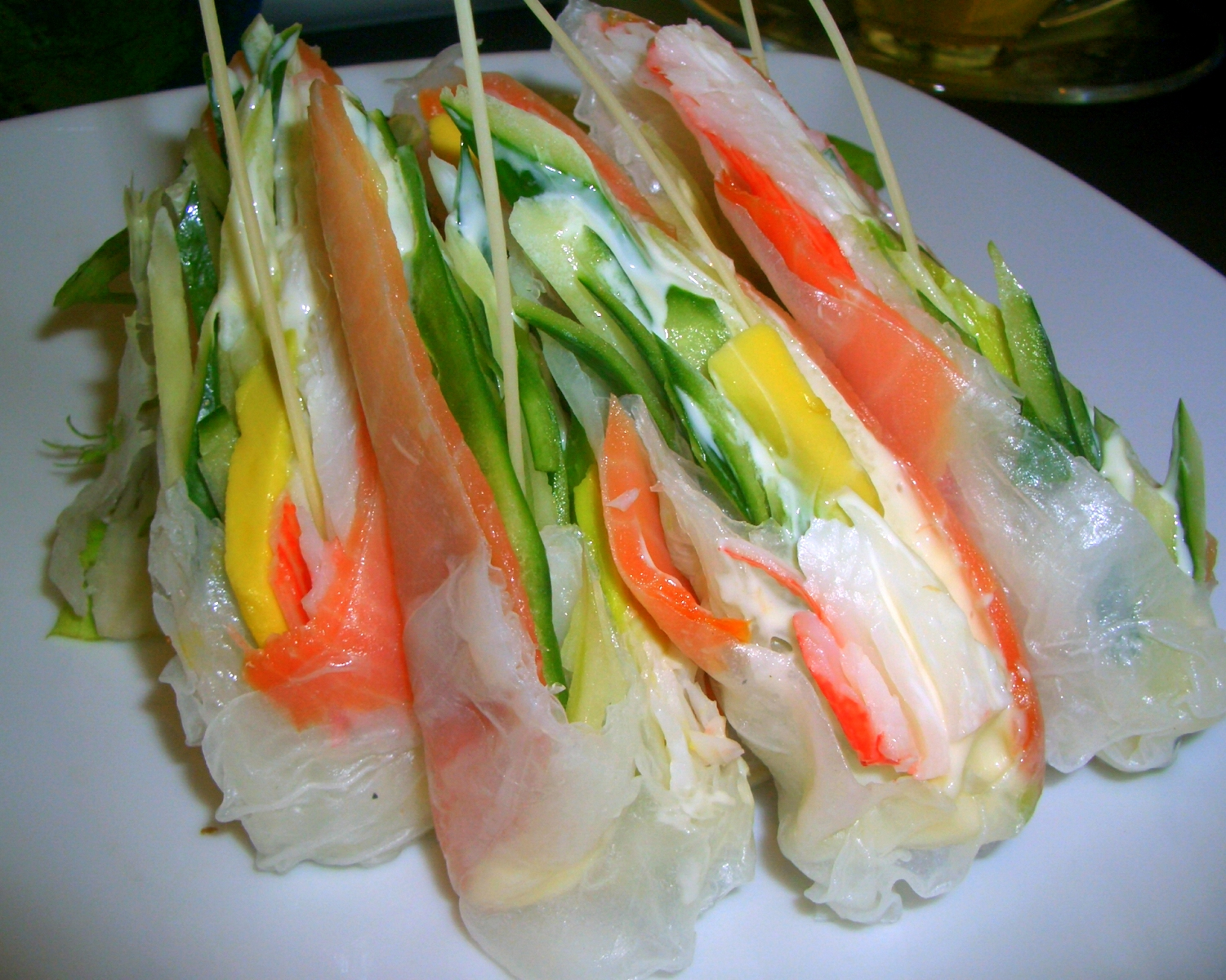
Example of a fusion dish: combination of smoked salmon wrapped in rice paper, with avocado, cucumber and crab sticks

== Types ==
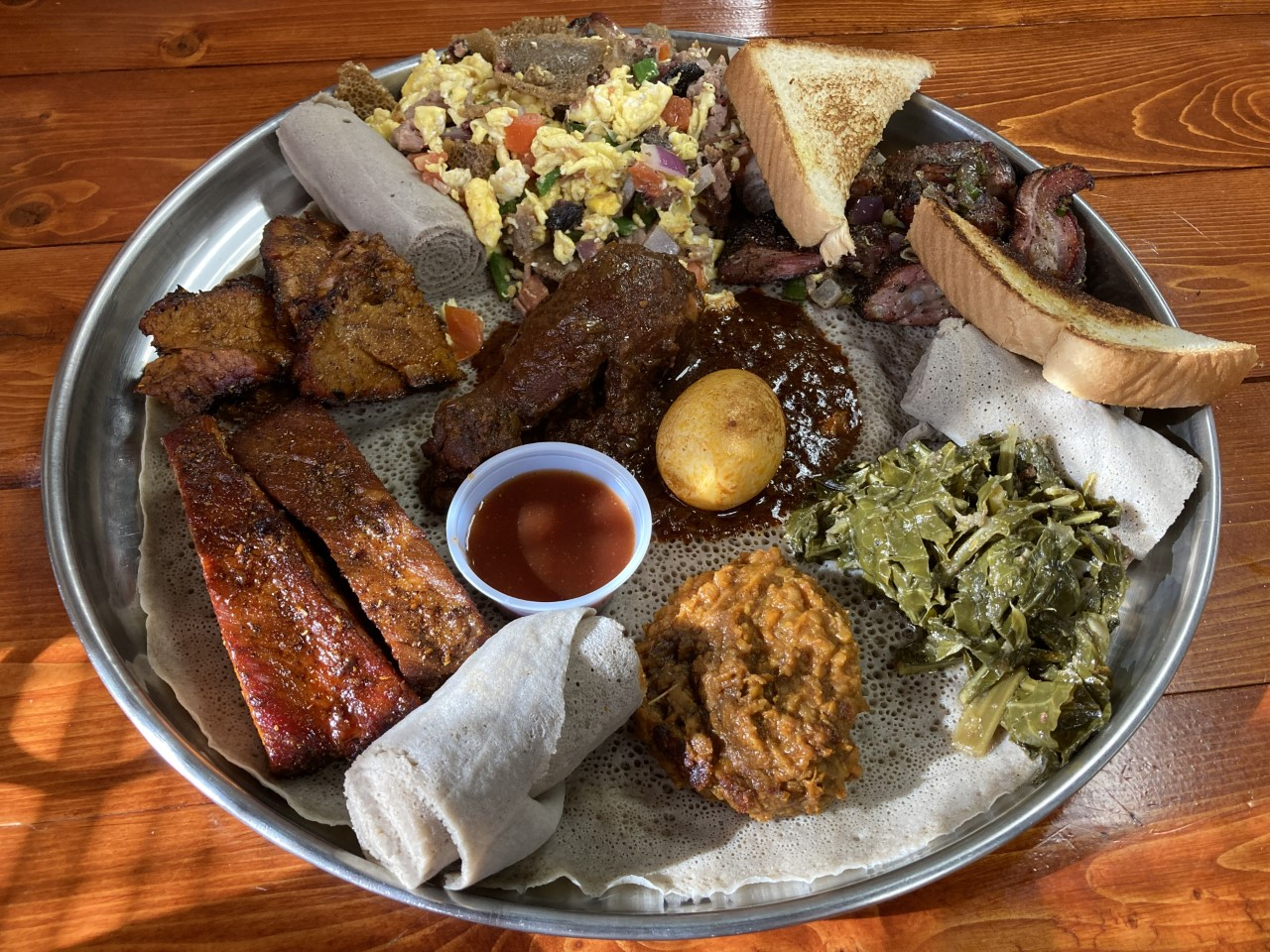
Traditional Ethiopian cuisine blended with Texas-style barbecue, including pork, smoked brisket, and Texas toast

Another form of fusion food can be created by utilizing ingredients and flavors from one culture to create a unique twist on a dish from the different cultures. For example, a taco pizza is a type of pizza created using taco ingredients such as cheddar and pepper jack cheese, salsa, refried beans, and other common taco ingredients, fusing both Italian and Mexican cuisines.

Similar approaches have been used for fusion sushi, such as rolling maki with different types of rice and ingredients such as curry and basmati rice, cheese and salsa with Spanish rice, or spiced ground lamb and capers rolled with Greek-style rice and grape leaves, which resembles inside-out dolmades. Some fusion cuisines have themselves become accepted as a national cuisine, as with Peruvian Nikkei cuisine, which combines Japanese spices and seasonings and Peruvian ingredients like ají with seafood. A quintessential Peruvian Nikkei dish is "maki acevichado" or "ceviche roll", consisting of ceviche with avocado rolled into maki.

Saudi Arabia has been investing in resources to preserve their culture. In Jeddah, different cultures from Africa and Asia have used the combination of Saudi Arabia's spices to create new fusion foods found throughout the region and the country.

== List of fusion cuisines ==
- American cuisine (European cuisine, Indigenous cuisine of the Americas, Soul food, Cajun cuisine, Louisiana Creole cuisine, Pennsylvania Dutch cuisine, Mormon foodways, Texan cuisine, Tex-Mex cuisine, and New-Mexican cuisine)
- Betawi cuisine (Indonesian cuisine with roots from Arab, Chinese, European, and Indian cuisines)
- Chifa (Chinese Cantonese cuisine and Peruvian cuisine)
- Hong Kong cuisine (Chinese cuisine, predominantly Cantonese, European cuisine, especially British, Japanese, Korean, and Southeast Asian cuisines)
- Indian Chinese cuisine (Indian cuisine and Chinese cuisine)
- Chinese Indonesian cuisine (Indonesian cuisine and Chinese cuisine)
- Italian-American cuisine (Italian cuisine and American cuisine)
- Itameshi (Japanese cuisine and Italian cuisine)
- Japanese Chinese cuisine (Japanese cuisine and Chinese cuisine)
- Louisiana Creole cuisine (American cuisine with roots from West African, French, Spanish, and Native American cuisines)
- Macanese cuisine (Chinese cuisine, with roots predominantly from Cantonese cuisine, Portuguese cuisine, and Southeast Asian cuisines)
- Malaysian Chinese cuisine (Chinese cuisine with roots from Fujian, Cantonese, Hakka, and Teochew cuisines, and Malaysian cuisine)
- Minnesotan cuisine (Swedish and Norwegian cuisine, with elements from American and Eastern European cuisines)
- New Mexican cuisine (Native American cuisine with roots from Spanish and Mexican cuisines)
- Peruvian cuisine (European cuisine, particularly Spanish and Italian, Asian cuisine, particularly Cantonese and Japanese, African cuisine, particularly Maghrebi and West African, and Indigenous cuisine, particularly Quechua and Aymara)
- Singaporean cuisine (Chinese cuisine, Malay/Indonesian cuisine, Indian cuisine, Peranakan cuisine, Eurasian cuisine, and * * European cuisine (particularly English and Portuguese cuisines)
- Taiwanese cuisine (Chinese cuisine, particularly Fujian and Hakka, Japanese cuisine, and American cuisine)
- Tex-Mex (American cuisine and Mexican cuisine)
- Yōshoku (Japanese cuisine and European cuisine)

== See also ==
- 2010s in food
- American Chinese cuisine
- California cuisine
- Eurasian cuisine of Singapore and Malaysia
- Hawaiian cuisine
- Korean-Mexican fusion
- Migrants' food consumption
- Modern Australian cuisine
- New American cuisine
- Nouvelle cuisine
- Peranakan cuisine
- Sushi burrito
- Sushi pizza
