= Mexican Pizza =

Taco Bell menu item

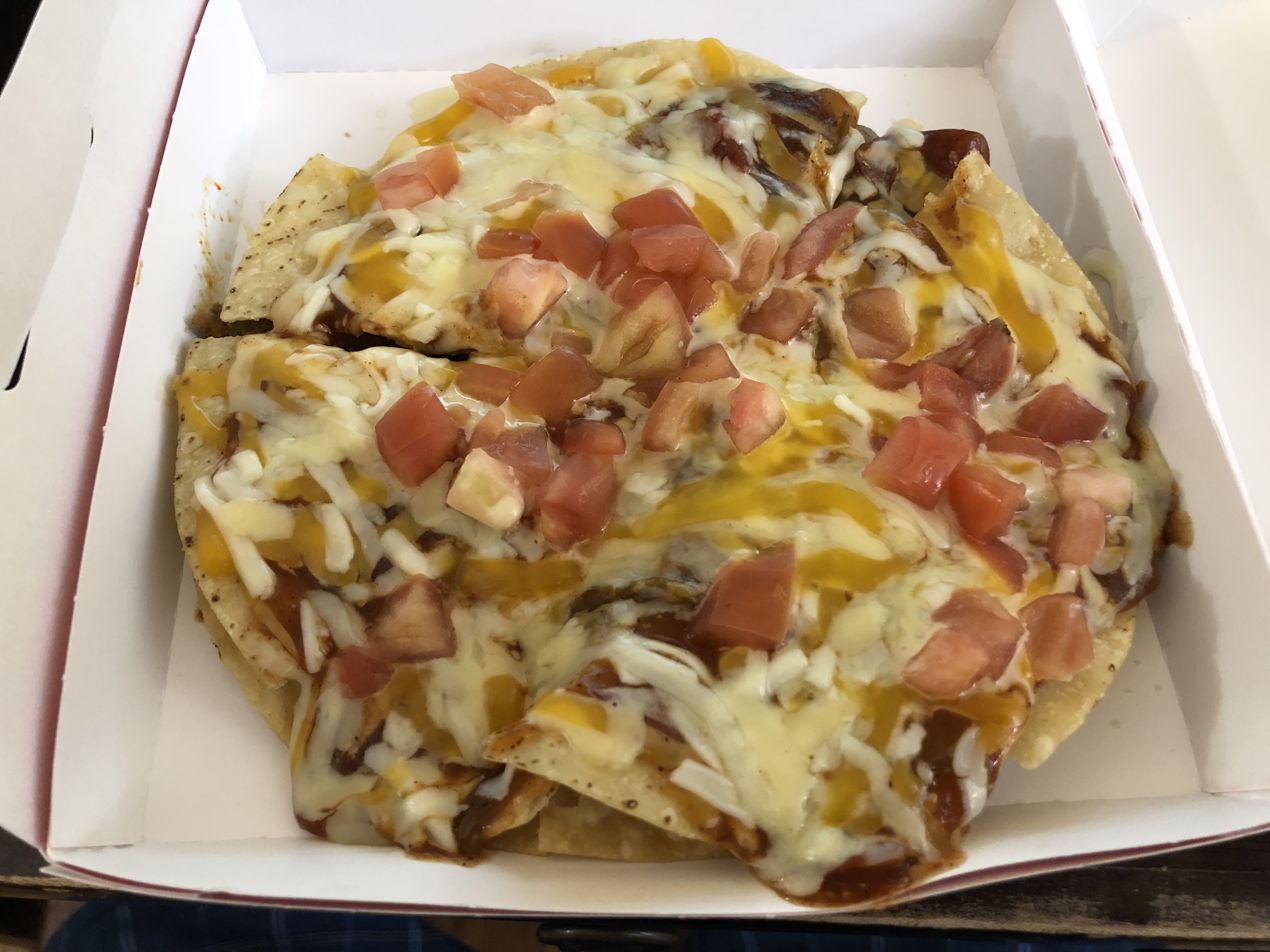
- Type: Pizza
- Place of origin: United States

The Mexican Pizza, originally called the Pizzazz Pizza, is a menu item at the U.S.-based chain Taco Bell. It consists of two fried flour tortillas with a filling of seasoned beef and refried beans, topped with tomato sauce, three cheeses, and diced tomatoes.

== History ==
Pizzazz Pizza TV commercial

The item was introduced in 1985 as the Pizzazz Pizza, when its recipe also included olives and green onions. It was renamed "Mexican Pizza" in 1988. The owners of a Cleveland-area pizzeria had sued Taco Bell's then-owner PepsiCo, claiming trademark infringement, in 1985, although Taco Bell did not mention the lawsuit as being related to the renaming.

Because the beef could be substituted with beans, making the Mexican Pizza suitable for vegetarians, the item became popular among South Asian Americans. On November 5, 2020, Taco Bell removed the Mexican Pizza from its menu, saying that its paperboard packaging had a significant environmental impact. In response, Krish Jagirdar, a vegetarian Indian American, started a change.org petition for Taco Bell to reinstate the Mexican Pizza. The petition attracted more than 170,000 signatures.

Taco Bell announced on April 18, 2022, that it would reintroduce the Mexican Pizza on May 19. Doja Cat, who had partnered with the company on an advertising campaign, told the audience during her performance at the Coachella Valley Music and Arts Festival on April 17, "I brought back the Mexican Pizza, by the way", in the middle of a song. Taco Bell thanked Jagirdar personally for his petition. Due to unforeseen demand, Taco Bell experienced supply shortages after it reintroduced the Mexican Pizza. The company reported that one customer bought 180 pizzas in one order.

On August 2, 2022, Taco Bell announced that the Mexican Pizza would return to menus permanently on September 15. The company denied that the sudden disappearance of the item following its May 2022 launch was a stunt, saying that demand was seven times higher than when it was previously available.

== Musical ==
Taco Bell commissioned Mexican Pizza: The Musical, which it had intended to premiere on TikTok on May 26, 2022, as a promotional tie-in for the item's reintroduction. Taco Bell said in a press release that the musical is a "satirical musical about the 'harrowing' story of those who fought to bring back the Mexican Pizza". Dolly Parton, Doja Cat, and TikToker Victor Kunda appeared in the 15-minute production. The musical was written by Hannah Friedman, with music by Abigail Barlow and Emily Bear. Taco Bell announced on May 9 that the release of its musical would be delayed. The musical streamed on TikTok on September 15, 2022.

== Gallery ==
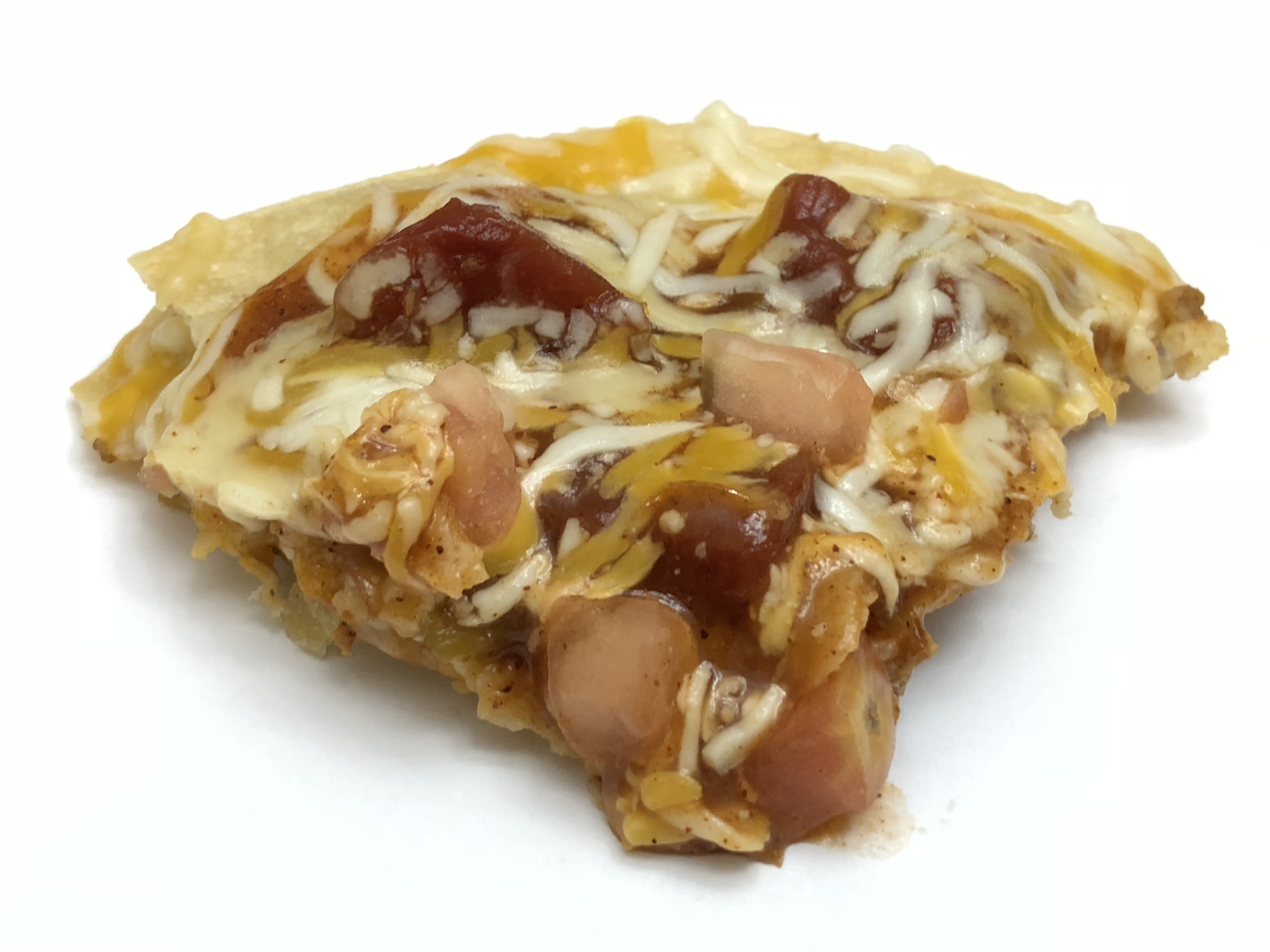
An individual slice of a Mexican Pizza

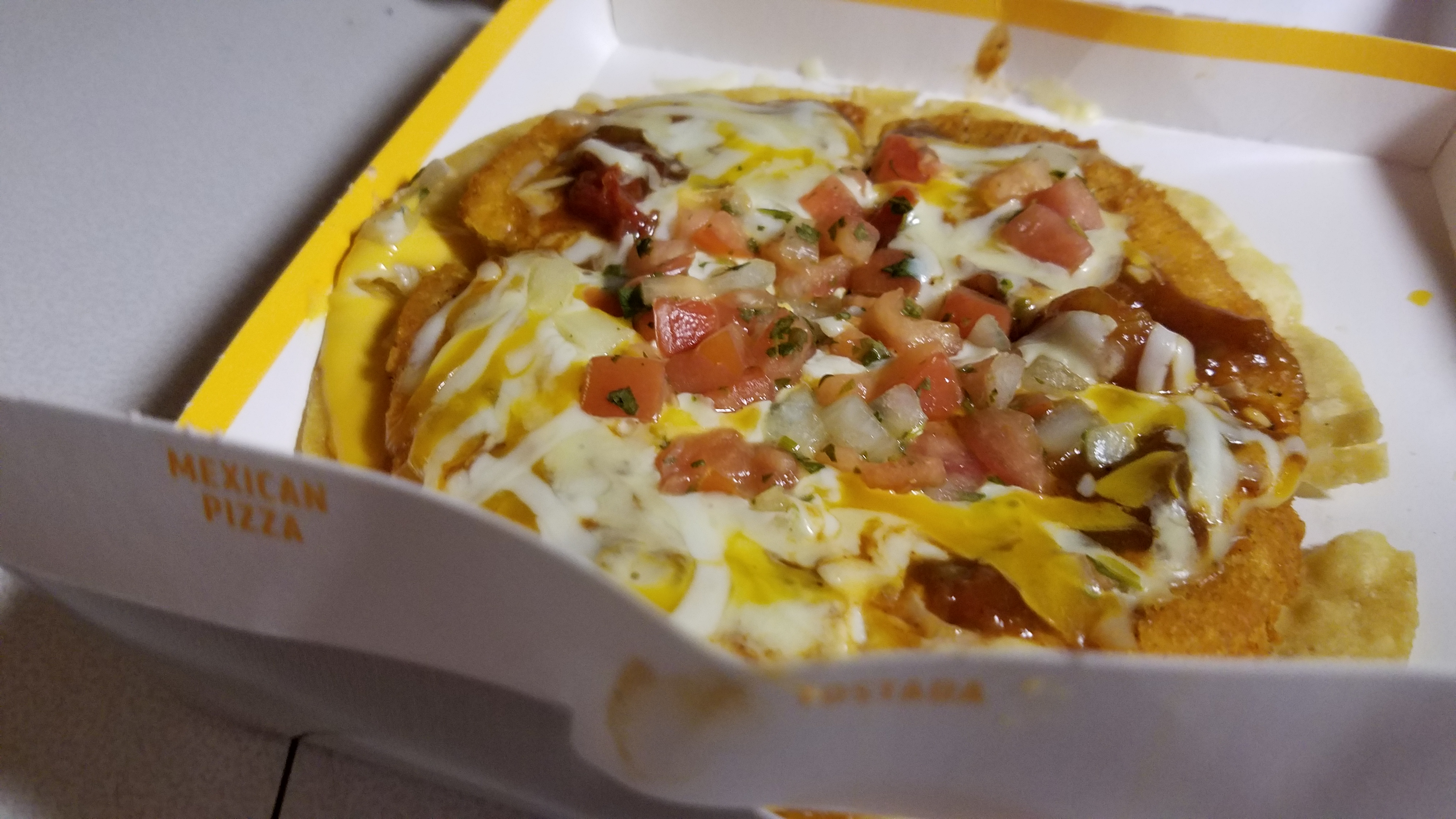
Mexican Crispy Chicken Pizza

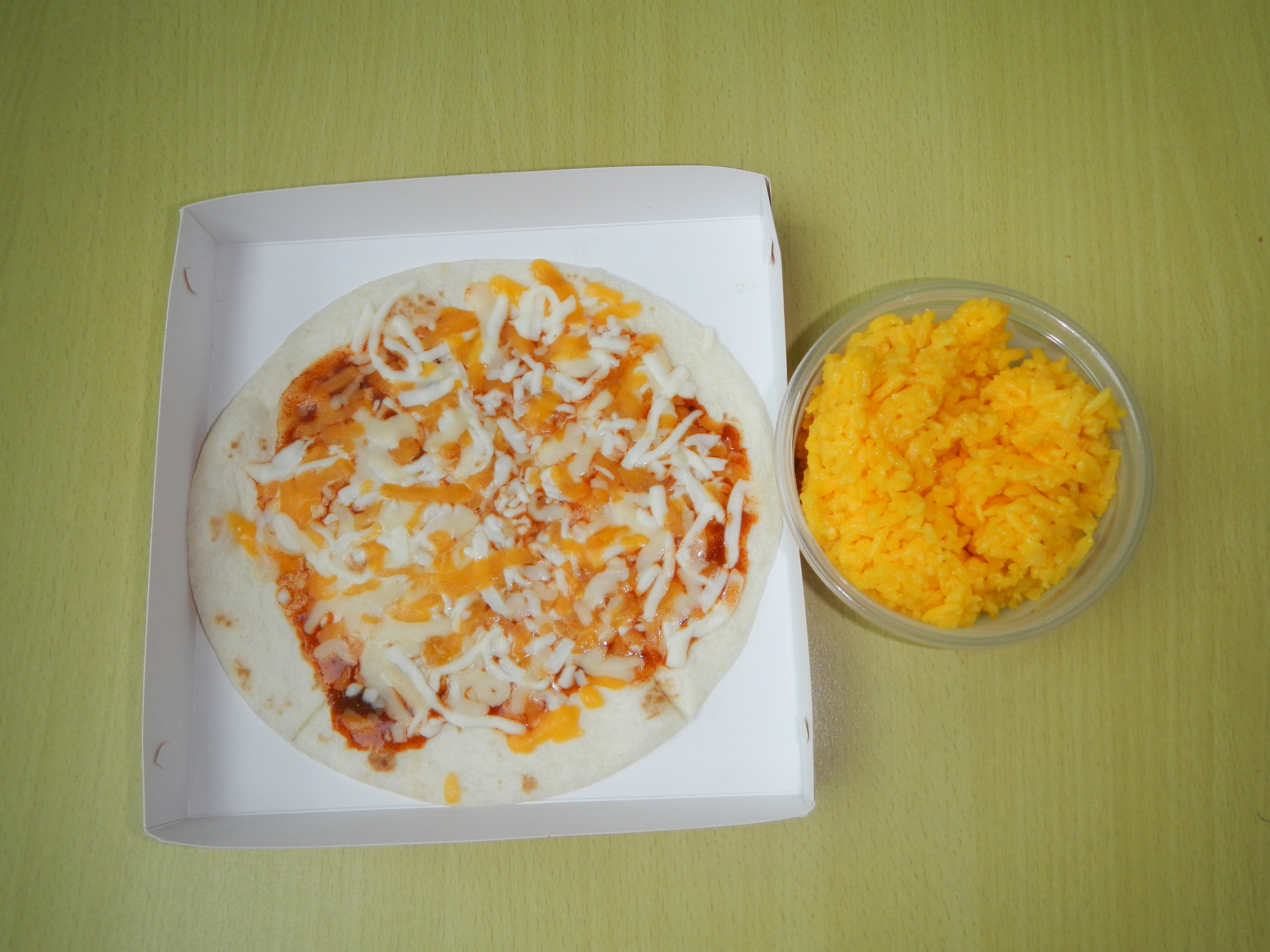
Tacodilla with rice from the Philippines

== See also ==
- Taco pizza
