= Pie Five =

American restaurant chain

Pie Five Pizza Company
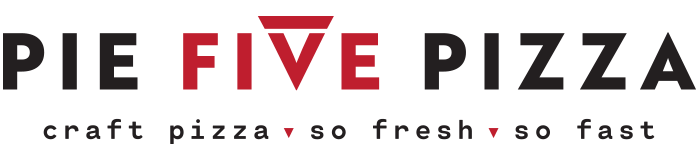
- Logo since 2019

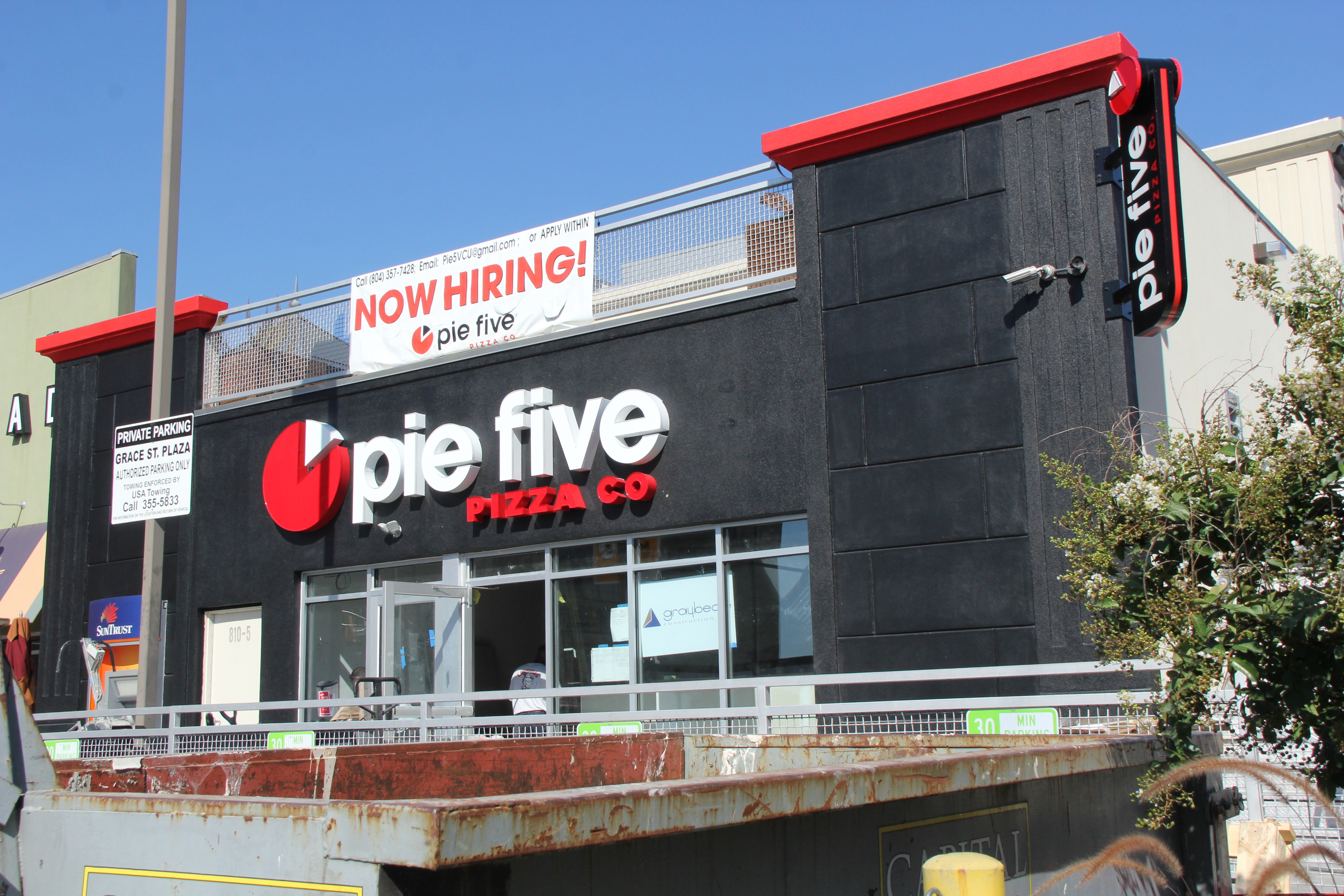
- Pie Five in Richmond, Virginia
- Trade name: Pie Five Pizza
- Type: Subsidiary
- Industry: Fast Casual
- Founded: June 2, 2011; 15 years ago in Fort Worth, Texas
- Headquarters: The Colony, Texas, United States
- Number of locations: 19 (December 2024)
- Area served: United States
- Key people: Brandon Solano, CEO RAVE Restaurant Group; Mike Burns, COO RAVE Restaurant Group; Douglas Kwong, VP of Marketing RAVE Restaurant Group; Aaron Archuleta, Director of Operations Pie Five Pizza
- Products: Handcrafted personal pizza, fresh salads, desserts, drinks
- Parent: Rave Restaurant Group
- Website: piefivepizza.com

Pie Five Pizza is an American fast casual restaurant chain specializing in personal pizza. The brand is owned by Rave Restaurant Group, which also owns Pizza Inn. As of December 2024, Pie Five operates 19 restaurants with locations in the following states: Arkansas, Illinois, Kentucky, Mississippi, Oklahoma, Oregon, Texas, and Virginia.

== Concept ==
Pie Five was named for the concept of preparing a customized pizza in five minutes. The menu offers standard and made-to-order personal pizzas, salads, calzones, bread, and dessert. Many locations serve beer.

== History ==
Original logo

On June 3, 2011, the company Pizza Inn opened the first Pie Five Pizza in Fort Worth, Texas. They had five locations within the Fort Worth area by the end of the year, and as of January 2015, they had 31 locations.

Former PepsiCo and Yum! Brands executive Randy Gier joined the company in 2012. He was CEO until 2016.

On January 9, 2015, the parent company Pizza Inn Holdings (ticker symbol: "PZZI") was rebranded as a portfolio company named Rave Restaurant Group (ticker symbol: "RAVE") as Pie Five Pizza locations began to increase.

In March 2017, Pie Five closed several midwestern stores, including two locations in the Twin Cities metro in Eden Prairie and Woodbury and all but one Chicago-area location, to focus on its other markets. Later that year, they opened their first West Coast store in San Francisco, California.

Three locations opened in south central Pennsylvania in early 2017, before converting to a regional franchise and ultimately closing in early 2018.

In October 2019, RAVE Restaurant Group announced that its board of directors has named Brandon L. Solano as chief executive officer.

In end-of-quarter/fiscal-year reporting as of October 2020, Pive Five comparable store retail sales had decreased 15.7 percent from the previous year, with most of the 42 locations said to be using third-party delivery services.

A January 2021 analysis of the chain's struggles identified reasons such as a highly competitive market, very fast location growth and franchising, accustomizing pizza customers to the fast-casual individual experience, mixed reviews at individual locations that may have kept customers from returning, poor marketing investment, potential impending Nasdaq delisting, and a 2018 credit card security breach.

In March 2021, Pie Five had announced a new Panzano Pan Crust. The company says it is uniquely positioned against its competitors to make this product because of the types of ovens they use.

== Awards ==
Pie Five Pizza is considered a pioneer of the first fast casual pizza category and has twice been named among Fast Casual's Top 15 "Movers & Shakers" (2013/2014). Pie Five has also been recognized as a 2012 Hot Concepts winner by Nation's Restaurant News and one of "10 Hot New Restaurant Chains from Established Brands" by Forbes.com.

- 2016 – Ranked #1 Restaurant Business by Future 50
- 2016 – Patty Scheibmeir listed on Fast Casual's Movers & Shakers people list
- 2015 – Named Best Franchise Deal by QSR Magazine
- 2015 – Ranked #3 on Fast Casual's Top 100 Movers & Shakers list
- 2014 – Hermes Creative Award Gold Winner for "Be Pie-Partisan" campaign
- 2014 – Listed on Fast Casual's Movers & Shakers people list
- 2014 – Ranked #13 on Fast Casual.com Top 50 Restaurant Brands of the Year
- 2013 – Ranked #40 on Fast Casual.com Top 50 Restaurant Brands of the Year
- 2013 – Named in "Top Trendsetting Executives in Pizza" by Pizza Marketplace
- 2012 – Named one of "10 Hot New Restaurant Chains from Established Brands" by Forbes
- 2012 – Named Hot Concepts Award winner by Nation's Restaurant News

== See also ==
- Blaze Pizza
- MOD Pizza
- Chipotle Mexican Grill
