= Pizza Inn =

American pizza chain

A Pizza Inn in Asheboro, North Carolina (2026): Type / Subsidiary; Industry / Restaurants; Founded / Dallas, Texas (1958; 68 years ago); Founders / Joe Spillman R. L. Spillman; Headquarters / The Colony, Texas, US; Number of locations / 96 (2026); Key people / Brandon Solano (CEO); Products / pizza; pasta; chicken wings; salads; sandwiches; desserts; soft drinks; Parent / Rave Restaurant Group; Website / www.pizzainn.com

Pizza Inn is a Dallas-based restaurant chain and international food franchise, specializing in American-style pan pizza, pasta, and side dishes, owned by Rave Restaurant Group.

The company is based in the Dallas suburb of The Colony, Texas. At its peak, Pizza Inn had over 500 locations in 20 states. As of June 28, 2020, Pizza Inn had 252 stores within the United States, located primarily in towns within the Southern United States, and 38 stores internationally.

== History ==
In 1958, two Texas brothers, F.J. (Joe) and R. L. Spillman, opened the first Pizza Inn in Dallas.

In the mid-1980s, the restaurant chain had a commercial deal with the Von Erich family, with Kerry Von Erich, Kevin Von Erich, and Mike Von Erich appearing in a series of televised commercials.

In June 2011, Pizza Inn launched the fast casual restaurant Pie Five Pizza, which specializes in customizable pizzas that are made within five minutes, in Fort Worth, Texas. They had five locations within the Fort Worth area by the end of the year. As of January 2015, they had 31 locations.

In October 2011, Pizza Inn opened their first of five planned Chinese locations in Hangzhou, China.

Former PepsiCo and Yum! Brands executive Randy Gier joined the company in 2012. He was CEO until 2016.

On January 9, 2015, the parent company Pizza Inn Holdings (ticker symbol: "PZZI") was rebranded as a portfolio company named Rave Restaurant Group (ticker symbol: "RAVE") as Pie Five Pizza locations began to increase.

In May 2018, Rave Restaurant Group opened its first PIE by Pizza Inn Express pizza kiosks with Delaware North at the Fort Lauderdale–Hollywood International Airport.

On February 5, 2021, Pizza Inn reported improving sales amid hectic environment during the COVID-19 pandemic. In the period ending December 27, domestic same-store sales decreased from $18.95 million to $15.46 million, or 18.4 percent for the company, which is the chain's best performing quarter since the pandemic began. Pizza Inn also saw comparative sales drop 39 percent in the quarter ending June 28 and 22 percent in the quarter ending September 27.

Pizza Inn has experienced sustained growth in recent years, with continued gains in both domestic comparable-store sales and restaurant development. In fiscal 2026, the brand reported positive domestic comparable-store sales growth of 8.1% in the first quarter and 2.5% in the second quarter, while continuing to expand its domestic restaurant footprint.

== Gallery ==
Store locations of Pizza Inn

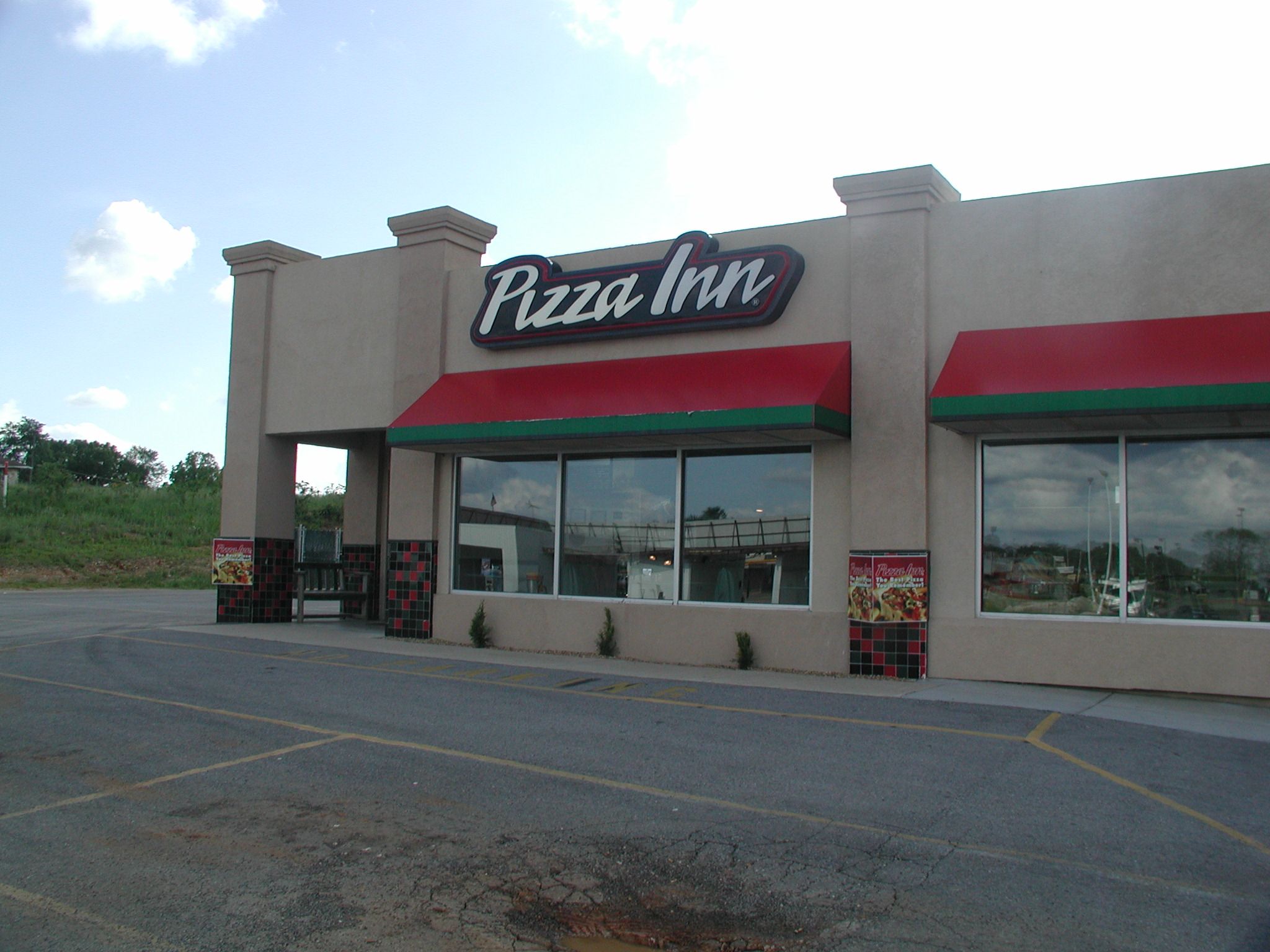
Pizza Inn location in Poplar Bluff, Missouri.

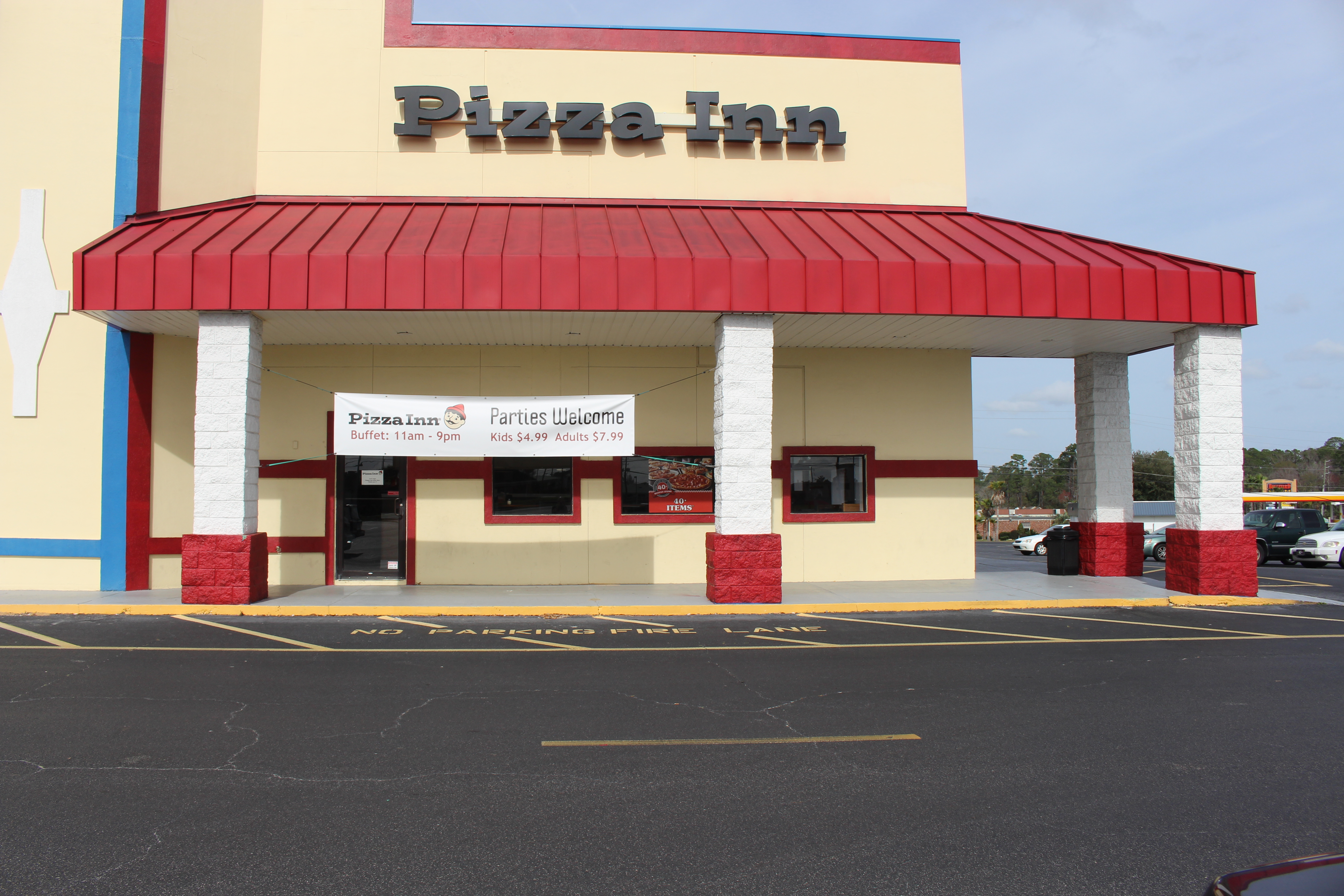
Pizza Inn location in Waycross, Georgia.

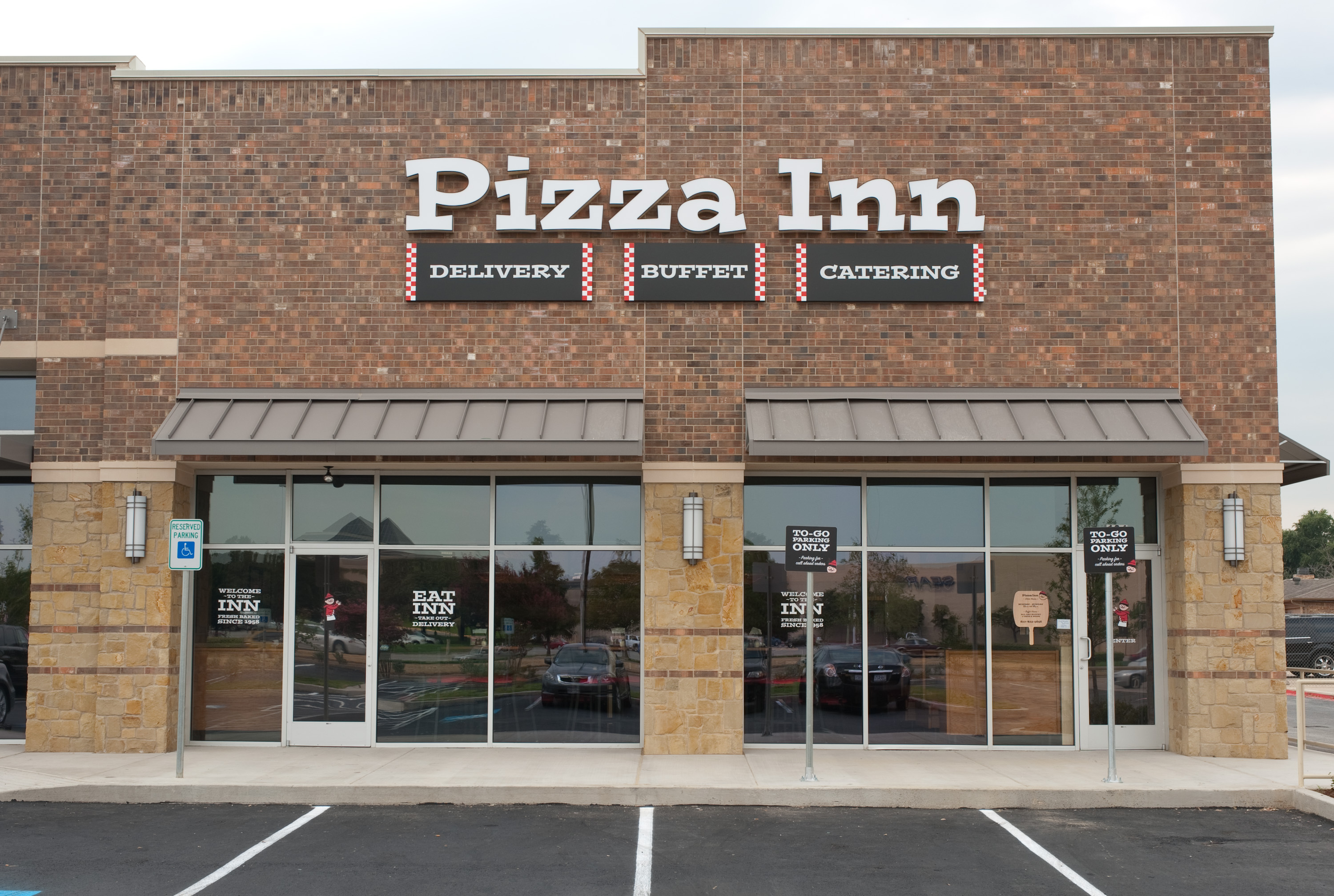
Pizza Inn location in Fort Worth, Texas.

== See also ==
- List of pizza chains of the United States
