= Victor Kunda =

English internet personality and model (born 1999)

- Born: Victor Oluwakoya Emitam Kunda; 15 July 1999 (age 27); London, England
- Education: De Montfort University
- Occupations: TikToker; comedian; fashion influencer; podcaster; model

Instagram information
- Page: Victor Kunda
- Years active: 2017–present
- Genres: Comedy; fashion
- Followers: 207 thousand

TikTok information
- Page: Victor Kunda
- Years active: 2020–present
- Genre: Comedy
- Followers: 873.1 thousand
- Modeling information
- Height: 181 cm (5 ft 11 in) ~ 187 cm (6 ft 2 in)
- Hair color: Black
- Eye color: Brown
- Agency: Rare Select Models
- Last updated: 6 September 2026

Victor Oluwakoya Emitam Kunda (/ˈkʊndə/ KUUN-də; born 15 July 1999) is an English internet personality and model, who became popular as a comedy TikToker and fashion influencer.

== Early life and education ==
Born in South-East London into a Christian family of Nigerian and Zambian origin, Kunda grew up between the Eltham and Lewisham neighbourhoods with his mother, sister and two brothers. He recalls being fond of performative arts since his childhood, having begun to sing, act and dance at an early age. He went on to enroll in a music and drama school, but later dropped out and switched to studying Media Production at De Montfort University in Leicester, where he graduated during the COVID-19 pandemic.

== Career ==
Kunda first started posting skits on Facebook and YouTube as early as 2016 subsequently moving to Instagram and Twitter, with several of his classmates encouraging him to join TikTok. He became known at the time of the COVID-19 lockdown for a TikTok post where he was using a breadstick as a cigarette, which quickly earned him 10 thousand followers and ultimately garnered more than 6 million views. He chose to continue posting humorous skits, some of which were shared by celebrities such as Bella Hadid, Lil Nas X and Doja Cat, and gained a larger following over time, amassing over a billion views by 2022.

Shortly after he became known as a comedian, Kunda received a request from a friend to take part in a photoshoot for an acquaintance's project at Central Saint Martins, marking his first steps in the fashion industry. As an influencer, Kunda has advertised or partnered with a number of fashion brands which include Burberry, Gucci, Prada, Valentino, Bottega Veneta, Tommy Hilfiger, Hugo Boss, Balenciaga, Zalando×Versace, Adidas, Labrum, Levi's, Kurt Geiger, Yohji Yamamoto, Ludovic de Saint Sernin and Off-White, as well as other companies like Charlotte Tilbury, Topicals, Paramount+, Coca-Cola, McDonald's and Durex. (Note: Attributed to multiple sources:) He has also modelled for artistic photoshoots, including a 2026 series by Campbell Addy centred on the "Black queer experience".

In 2022, Kunda featured alongside Doja Cat and Dolly Parton on the TikTok satirical short film Mexican Pizza: The Musical, recounting the story of a client who fights to get Mexican Pizza back on Taco Bell's menu. The same year, he served as the host for Channel 4's comedy web show Razor Sharp. He also made appearances on the TV programmes The Emily Atack Show (2022) and Dropped (2023), as well as taking part in shows for nonprofit purposes, including the NCS-sponsored The Big Escape (2023) and the 2026 edition of Comic Relief's Red Nose Day.
