= Happy Joe's =

Pizza chain in the United States

Happy Joe's Pizza & Ice Cream
- Type: Private
- Industry: Restaurant
- Founded: 1972; 54 years ago in Bettendorf, Iowa
- Founder: Lawrence Joseph "Happy Joe" Whitty
- Headquarters: Bettendorf, Iowa
- Number of locations: 39 (2026)
- Areas served: United States: Arizona, Iowa, Illinois, Minnesota, North Dakota, Wisconsin; Middle East: Egypt
- Key people: Thomas Sacco (CEO & President, Dynamic)
- Products: Italian-American cuisine; (pizza; pasta; desserts)
- Owner: Dynamic Restaurant Holdings
- Website: happyjoes.com

Happy Joe's is an American pizza parlor chain based in Bettendorf, Iowa. The restaurant chain was founded in 1972 by Lawrence Joseph "Happy Joe" Whitty, a former Shakey's Pizza manager. Their United States locations are spread out across the Upper Midwest and Arizona, with 6 locations in Egypt, the first of which opened in October 2022.

In 2022, Happy Joe's has declared an intent over 10 years to open at least 25 locations across the Middle East and North Africa, including in Bahrain, Egypt, Jordan, Kuwait, Morocco, Qatar, Saudi Arabia and the U.A.E.,though on September 15, 2022, Happy Joe's parent company, Dynamic Restaurant Holdings, filed for Chapter 11 bankruptcy and closed several corporate-owned stores, although franchised restaurants are not affected by the bankruptcy.

== History ==
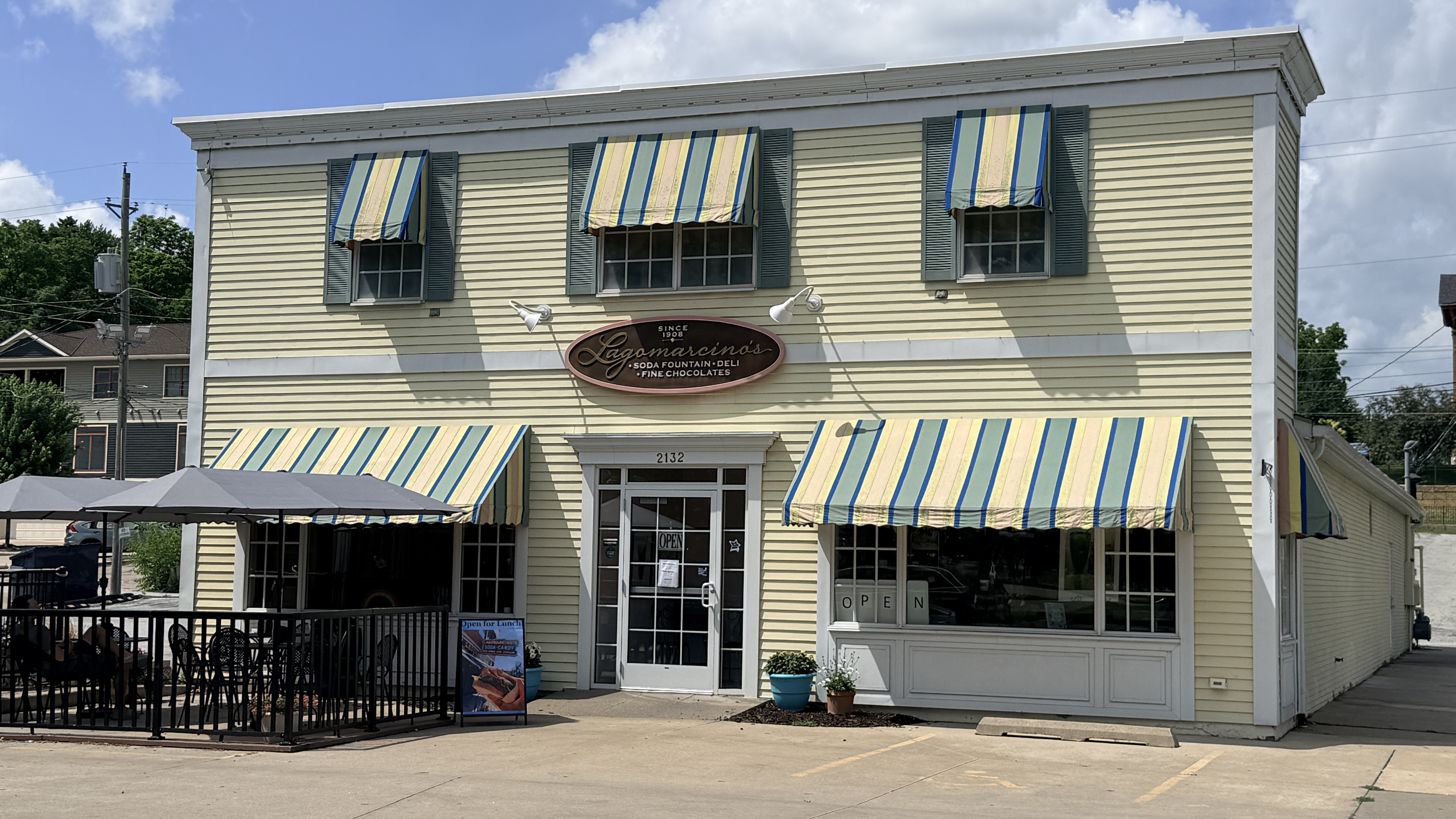
The original Happy Joe’s location in Davenport, Iowa

The chain was started in 1972 by Lawrence Joseph "Happy Joe" Whitty after he was disciplined for throwing a child a birthday party while working at Shakey's Pizza. Birthday parties became a centerpoint for the restaurant as did its signature taco pizza (claimed by the chain to be the first pizza place to offer such an item) and Joegurt (ice cream infused yogurt).

In the 1980s, the chain had operated a location in Cairo, Egypt that was shaped like a boat and was situated on the Nile River.

The chain has also expanded into other Midwestern markets with locations in Wisconsin, Minnesota, North Dakota, Missouri, and Illinois along with their home-state of Iowa.

The Happy Joe's location on Gilbert Street in Iowa City, Iowa was destroyed by a tornado on April 13, 2006, part of the Easter Week 2006 Tornado Outbreak Sequence. A follow-up restaurant in Coralville was lost to floods in 2008, but it was rebuilt and continued to operate.

In the mid-2010s, the chain debuted a new concept alongside the traditional restaurants called Happy Joe's Pizza Grille where you can get traditional American fare such as Rubens alongside their signature pizza and Joegurt. They also feature a small buffet featuring their pizzas as well.

The chain also had a presence in Arizona with two since closed stores, however, a return to Arizona is in the works with plans to open more restaurants in the state in the future.

On October 29, 2019, Happy Joe Whitty died at the age of 82 at the Clarissa C. Cook Hospice Center.

In 2022, the chain has plans to expand their operations to the Middle East and North Africa. They have plans to open at least 25 new restaurants across Bahrain, Egypt, Jordan, Kuwait, Morocco, Qatar, Saudi Arabia and the U.A.E. over the course of 10 years. The first location the chain plans to open is in Cairo, Egypt, where they had one previously.

In addition to the aforementioned stores, they also have two restaurants in Florida, their first in the Southern United States. They also have stores planned for Branson (their first store outside of the St. Louis Metro), an additional store in the St. Louis metro, and an as of yet determined location in the Dallas-Fort Worth Metroplex. Cities floated for the proposed location include Grand Prairie, Cedar Hill, and Arlington, with plans to open in one of those cities before the end of 2023. This represents a milestone for the company as it will be their first minority-owned franchise in addition to being the first one in Texas.

== Products ==
=== Taco pizza ===
Joseph Whitty's "Happy Joe's" claimed to be the first pizza restaurant to offer a taco pizza (a pizza with refried bean/tomato sauce, cheese, lettuce, tomato and taco chips). After a franchisee suggested adding tacos to the menu, Whitty invented the restaurant's best-selling product, the Taco Pizza.

=== Breakfast pizza ===
In 2005, Happy Joe's started offering breakfast pizzas at select locations.

=== Flatbread pizza ===
In 2013, Happy Joe's started offering flatbread pizzas.

=== Gluten-free crusts ===
Happy Joe's also offers gluten-free crusts, designed for those with gluten allergies.

=== Birthday parties ===
It also features outlandish birthday parties. He was inspired to include birthday parties in his restaurant concept after he got disciplined after hosting one at the Shakey's Pizza he managed.

=== Joegurt ===
Joegurt is the chain's signature ice cream product that combines ice cream with yogurt. It is available at all the locations including the Pizza Grille locations. It is not currently sold in grocery stores.

== See also ==
- List of pizza chains of the United States
- Quad City-style pizza
