= Migrants' food consumption =

Migrants’ food consumption is the intake of food on a physical and symbolic level from a person or a group of people that moved from one place to another with the intention of settling, permanently in the new location. Food consumption can provide insights into the complex experience of migration, because it plays a central role to the memory, comfort and all processes needed to adapt to a new country and environment and even to social relations within and beyond the family.

== Eating culture ==
The major elements of eating do not only include the process of eating itself but also the social setting and the social environment. That means food and its consumption is a ritual artifact on a daily basis, such as a coffee break, dinner or a business lunch. Furthermore, any food item may become a conveyor of meaningful messages because of a symbolic framing that is rooted not in the attributes of the food itself but in the expected function of the food. Food is a key component for our culture and identity. The choice of food shows a cultural expression and practice, that is influenced by economics, society, culture history and individuality. In the case of an immigrant the choice of food and its related eating habits, are intensified because the immigrant carries two worlds within himself. The original one and the new one. So there is a correlation between food and their cultures.

== Migrants' approaches of food consumption ==
=== Traditional food consumption ===
Traditional food consumption is the attitude and practice of maintaining the eating habits of the home country in a new settling country. This approach is influenced by many factors, like maintaining connection with home.

Considering the concrete and practical issues, migrants could not be familiar with the new cuisine and could not be able to prepare the typical new country's foods. Moreover, migrants manage to maintain their food traditions thanks to the easiness of finding ingredients in stores even if they are expensive.

Another influencing feature of maintaining traditional food consumption is the quality of the food itself, which for many immigrant families does not respect their typical diet in terms of nutrition facts or quality of the ingredients. For example, according to a research among West African moved to New York city, for African migrant's families, the large amounts of processed foods with high values of saturated fats and refined sugars, combined with low consumption of fruits, vegetables and whole grains, which characterized the Western diet, represents a stark departure from the foods and diet habits common in their home countries. In this case, could happen that, migrants dissatisfied with the quality and freshness of food, prefer to cook traditional food at home because considered healthier and better.

The traditional food approach is also influenced by ritual and cultural habits. Maintaining the home eating and cultural food habits represent a strategy to recreate the “home” and the practical and metaphorical rituals for remembrance the imaginary unity which migrants tend to miss. The traditional food is the recreation of the abstract meaning of home through concrete activities, such as cooking the typical Sunday meals, which can alleviate the sense of isolation caused by the displacement. Also social habits and religion can be considered a support for the maintenance of food traditions. For example, according to Arab cultures hospitality represents strong tradition combined with food. Indeed, it is common and quite diary for Arab families to prepare extra food at meal times to cover the eventuality of unexpected visitors and welcome them offering traditional foods.

=== Adapting to new culture ===
Because of this strong relation between food and identity, for most of the immigrants, losing traditional culinary practices is associated with the abandon of community, family, and religion. Nevertheless, incorporation of new food elements and changes in meal patterns is natural and it happens very often, specially because of the new generation (sometimes born in the new country or arrived at very young age, without any construct memory about the old country) that adapt to new culture more easy than their parents. Consequently, migrants who are first-generation (born outside the new country) and second-generation (born in the new country) also report different eating behaviors. For example, second generation Asian Americans report higher processed meat intake than first generation Asian Americans.

Willing to be like their friends at school, children pressure their mother for the inclusion of new foods or old food items cooked in new ways which they have consumed at school or at friends’ homes. There is also the influence of TV commercials. This kind of pressure made by children over mothers sometimes causes tension in the family, however is not an inflexible tension, since mothers prefer to satisfy the desires of their children to impose a tradition.

By modifying the food item so that it is less foreign to the palate, its symbolic meanings change. In turn, the new food becomes more familiar and less threatening. And although meal patterns have changed and new foods have been incorporated into immigrant families’ cuisines, the importance of traditional foods does not diminish.

There is also another aspect of introducing new foods which is related to the availability of traditional ingredients, such as coriander and halal meat in Arabic cuisine. Even if there are specialized shops in ethnic foods, normally located in big cities, where immigrants can find some of the ingredients they need to prepare traditional dishes, the availability of these ingredients sometimes can be limited or expensive. As a consequence, immigrants often must adapt traditional dishes to different flavors and techniques. Because of the important role food plays in constructing ethnic identity, not being able to find these foods easily also contributes to the anxieties of migrating and settling. The lack of ethnic food is symbolic of isolation.

==== The role of immigrant mothers ====
In this process of adaption to the new culture, women have a special role because usually they are responsible for the cooking. Not only are they responsible for the purchase and preparation of food, as they must ensure that food proscriptions are followed and that suitable foods are available for their families. Dietary proscriptions are delineated by various religious traditions, including Islam and Hinduism.

Even if women try to satisfy the desire of children by introducing new foods´ elements in the table, also through traditional food they teach their children about the meaning of being from another culture and/or religion, such as Arabic, Chinese, Buddhist or Muslim.

To avoid their children's rejection, mothers use some strategies to assist their children. For example, by packing school lunches, as opposed to allowing children to purchase lunch in the cafeteria. Or providing their children with substantial breakfasts in order to decrease the chance that their children will become hungry and snack on proscribed foods.

=== Creolization ===
Historically, colonization built the culture of the New World. The miscegenation that occurred between Europeans, Africans (that got there as slaves) and indigenous at that period was the basis of the culture of countries such as USA and Brazil. Besides the transformation of the language, this mix of cultures gave birth to a new way of eating, that is in constant transformation.

Actually, colonial America provides an excellent starting place for a study of multi-ethnic American eating and its relationship to identity. The colonial era provides evidence of the pleasure most people took not only in consuming the familiar comfort foods of their childhoods but in adopting new foods and incorporating new ingredients and techniques into their traditions.

In California, mestizo settlers from Mexico brought corn, beans, chiles, and irrigation, introducing them to the migratory natives. In the Middle Atlantic region, English Quakers adopted Indian corn and other native ingredients, along with some home remedies (especially the use of sassafras); they borrowed apple butter, bacon dumplings, bologna sausage, sauerkraut, and liver sausage from their German neighbors in Pennsylvania. The Dutch settlers of New York, like the German settlers in Pennsylvania, also gained a reputation for the pleasure they took in bounteous meals, and they too contributed a number of distinctive dishes—cookies and coleslaw—to regional food repertoires. Africans too left their mark on regional American eating. This was especially clear in the lowland regions of the Carolinas and Georgia. As Americans entered their own era of independence and nationalism, they carried with them eating habits and identities that incorporated in pleasurable ways a long history of multi-ethnic interaction.

== Ethnic food ==
=== Definition ===
Ethnic food or ethnic cuisine refers to food that does not have its origin in this certain culture but brought from foreign cultures and cuisines and were integrated into everyday cuisine there. The integration of traditional food in new countries can be seen as part of this sociological transformation on eating habits, that are being constantly modified not only by waves of immigration but also by new fads that in some cases last for such a long period of time that at the end it becomes totally integrated in the new culture. The integration of traditional food in new countries can be seen as part of this sociological transformation on eating habits, that are being constantly modified not only by waves of immigration but also by new fads that in some cases last for such a long period of time that at the end it becomes totally integrated in the new culture.

Especially in the US with its multicultural heritage and nature one might say they have a “diversity” or “creolization” of foods.

=== Cases ===
==== Burritos in the United States ====
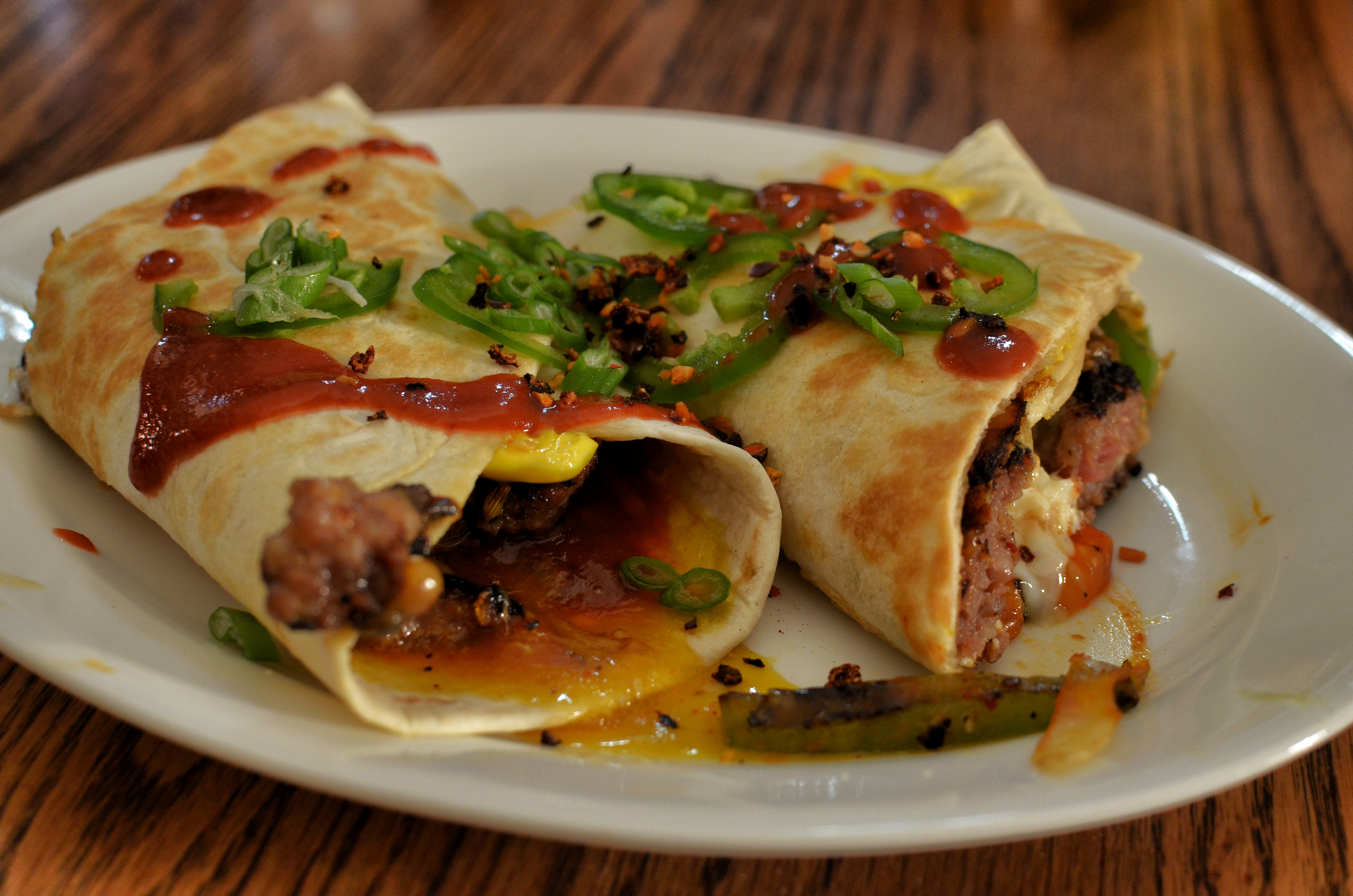
Burritos

An example of the integration of traditional food into new countries is the fame of burritos, a typical Mexican dish, that became part of the cultural habits of North Americans. A conglomeration of meat, rice, beans and salsa in an oversized wheat-flour tortilla, the burrito came into existence in mid-nineteenth-century San Antonio, Texas. Later in the century the burrito, became popular in the northern borderlands. And today, flocks of young people crowd into the Taquería Pancho Villa in the Mission District of San Francisco for bulging, aluminium-foil-wrapped burritos advertised on the restaurant's website as ‘authentic Mexican food’.

==== Chinese food in the United States ====
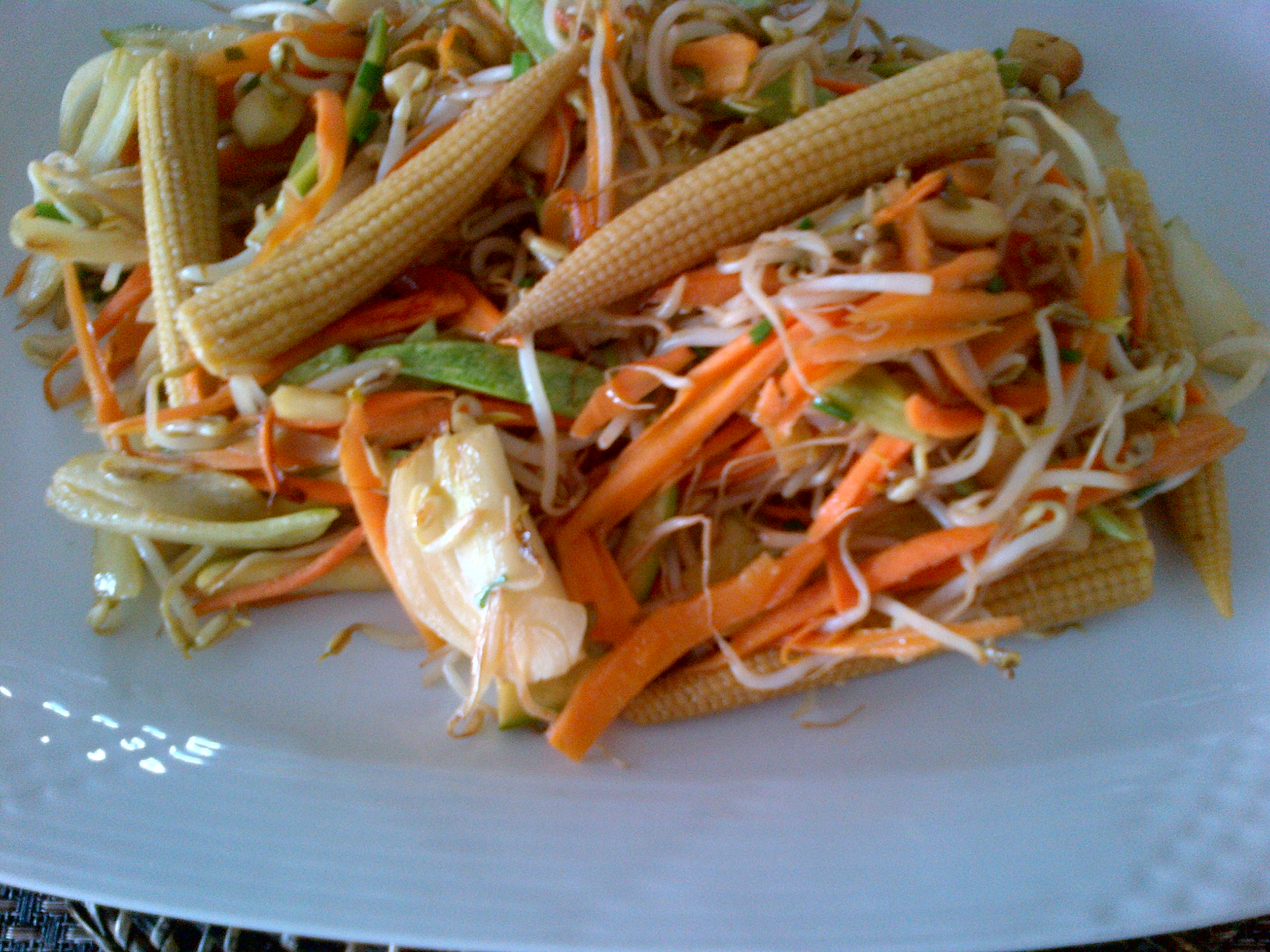
Chop suey

Since the 1980s Chinese food had become the most popular ethnic cuisine in the US so that in 2008 there some 40.000 Chinese restaurants in the US, more than the number of McDonald's, Burger Kings and KFCs combined. The Chinese cuisine was engendered by some individual Chinese immigrants, who spread Chinese restaurants in the US. This was an extension of the role of Chinese Americans as service workers. The further development of the Chinese cuisine was also a result of the efforts of Chinese Americans in transplanting, preserving and promoting their cuisine. Especially Chop Suey became the Chinese food that prevailed in the American restaurant market also because for most Americans the Chinese food has largely remained an inexpensive dining-out or take-away opportunity.

==== Pizza ====
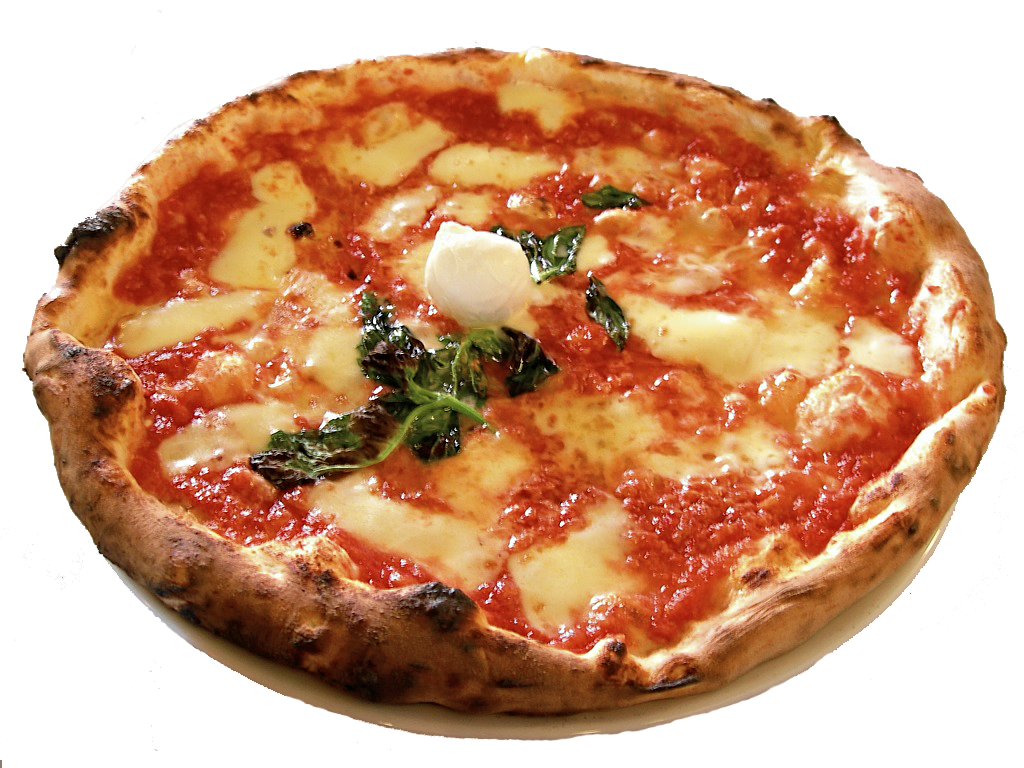
Pizza margherita

Pizza is a typical example of ethnic food, above all if US is considered. Indeed, in the late 19th and in the early 20th century Pizza migrated to the United States with Neapolitans who were coming for factory jobs not with the intention to create a culinary statement.

Relatively quickly, the pizza as a traditional Italian food spread also among non-migrants citizens. As a consequence of Italian's migration, pizza reached different countries. Its popularity across the world became famous with different pizzas of new and non-Neapolitan variations, including for example California-gourmet pizzas topped with anything from barbecued chicken to smoked salmon.

Pizza shows how an ethnic food can adapt and reflect local tastes with toppings, which can go from Gouda cheese in Curaçao to hardboiled eggs in Brazil.

== See also ==
- List of cuisines
- Human Migration
- Food festival
- Cuisine of the Thirteen Colonies
- Fusion cuisine
