= Taco pizza =

Pizza with taco ingredients

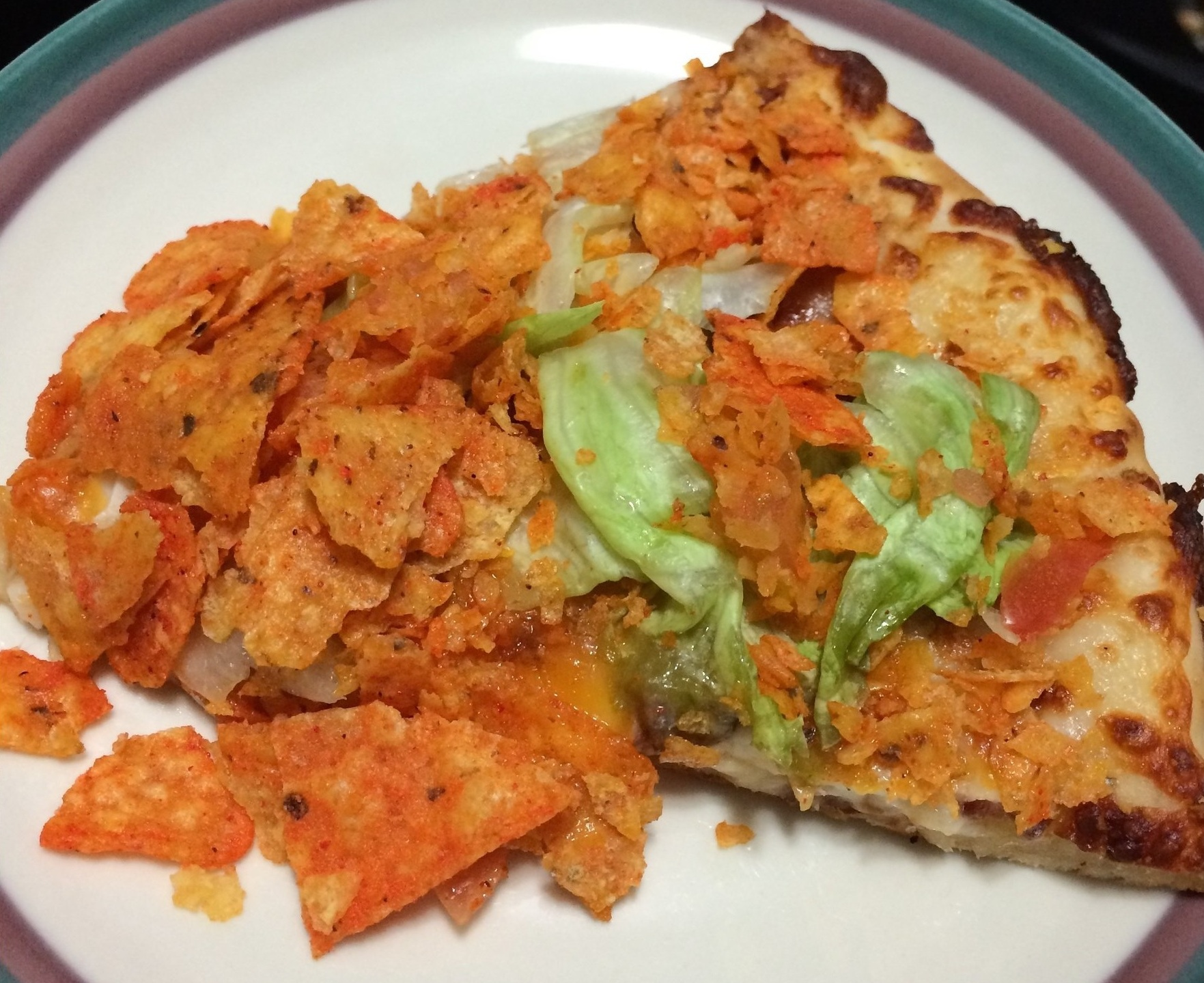
- Taco pizza from Casey's
- Type: Pizza
- Place of origin: United States
- Region or state: Midwestern
- Created by: Joe Whitty, potentially
- Invented: 1974, potentially
- Main ingredients: Taco

Taco pizza is a pizza that uses taco ingredients. The owner of the pizza chain Happy Joe's invented taco pizza. The pizza has been served by other locations.

== Potential origin and patents ==
The pizza parlor chain Happy Joe's in Davenport, Iowa, claimed to have invented taco pizza. After refusing to allow a franchisee to add tacos to their menu, Happy Joe's owner Joe Whitty decided to make something better than tacos. Whitty claimed that the taco pizza was created in December 1974 when he topped his pizza with taco chips, lettuce, and tomatoes. Whitty's daughter, Kristel Whitty-Ersan, said, "At the time, no one was making specialty pizzas." In 1979, restaurant chain Pizza Inn wanted to patent the name taco pizza, but competitor Pizza Hut disagreed by saying that the creation was not special and not worth rights to its name. Previously, Pizza Inn had trademarks for the name in eight states and then tried to receive a national trademark. Pizza Hut came up with their version of taco pizza while using the name in their menus and advertisements. Pizza Inn sent a letter to Pizza Hut claiming that they have exclusive rights to the name and Pizza Hut responded that taco pizza is only a description. Happy Joe's partnered with Pizza Hut in court and agreed that taco pizza is only a generic name of the food.

== Other locations ==
Gas station chain Casey's is known for their taco pizza. Author Chuy Renteria said, "Taco pizza, the second thing that makes Casey's stand out, is a little harder for outside folks to wrap their heads around. Casey's taco pizza consists of ground beef, lettuce, and tomato on a crust lined with a bean dip spread." Taco pizza has also been served at the pizza chain Godfather's Pizza. In 1995, The Pillsbury Company created a taco pizza recipe using Totino's frozen pizzas. A 2020 study by Zippia of each state's favorite pizza concluded that taco pizza is the favorite pizza of Iowa.

== See also ==
- List of pizza varieties by country
