= Portfolio company =

Entity used for investments

A portfolio company (commonly abbreviated as PortCo) is a company or entity in which a venture capital firm, a startup studio, or a holding company invests. All companies currently backed by a private equity firm can be spoken of as the firm's portfolio.

A company may create a portfolio to showcase the capabilities and strengths of the business's services. The portfolio is a collection of the products, services and achievements of the company. The goal of a company portfolio is to create a presence of the business on the market, attract more customers and to show how the business differs from its direct competitors on the market. The company portfolio is also used as a business strategy to show the growth of the company to attract potential investors and shareholders.
