= Tauber (surname) =

Tauber is a river in Germany. It is also the surname of:

- Alfred Tauber (1866–1942), Austrian mathematician
- Alfred I. Tauber (born 1947), American philosopher and historian
- Bernd Tauber (born 1950), German actor
- Henryk Tauber (1917–2000), Polish Jewish Holocaust survivor
- Jim Tauber (1950–2025), American film executive and producer
- Maria Anna Tauber, Austrian soprano
- Marina Tauber (born 1986), Moldovan politician
- Mathias Tauber (born 1984), Danish footballer
- Maurice Tauber (1908–1980), American librarian
- Nick Tauber, British record producer
- Nicolás Tauber (born 1980), Argentine-Israeli footballer
- Olga Von Tauber (1907–2002), Austrian-American psychiatrist
- Peter Tauber (born 1974), German politician
- Richard Tauber (1891–1948), Viennese tenor (born Ernst Seiffert)
- Sophie Tauber (1889–1943), Swiss artist
- Ulrike Tauber (born 1958), German swimmer
- William C. Tauber, American entrepreneur
- Yanki Tauber (born 1965), Jewish writer

== See also ==
- Irene Barnes Taeuber (1906–1974), American demographer
- Teyber (musician family sometimes spelled this way)
- Taube (disambiguation), includes "Taub"
- Taubes
- Taubmann
- Dauber (disambiguation)
- Daub (disambiguation)
