= Daub (disambiguation) =

Daub or Daube may refer to:

- Daub or Daube, a surname
- Wattle and daub, dwelling construction technique and materials, using woven latticework daubed with a sand, clay and/or dung mixture
- Daube, a type of stew in French cuisine
- Daube, the puck in Ice stock sport
- Daube glacé, a jellied stew appetizer in New Orleans cuisine
- Biskra Airport (IATA airport code: BSK; ICAO airport code: DAUB) in Algeria

== See also ==
- Dauber (disambiguation)
- Taube (disambiguation)
- Taubes
- Taube
- Taub
