= Taube (disambiguation) =

Taube, Taubes, Taub or Taubs, may refer to:

== People ==
- Taube, a surname
- Taub, a surname
- Taubes, a surname
- Teyber, Austrian family of musicians sometimes spelled this way
- Taube family, a Baltic German noble family

== Places ==
- Taube (river), in Saxony-Anhalt, Germany

== Vehicles ==
- Airdrome Taube, an American amateur-built aircraft
- Etrich Taube, a pre-World War I monoplane aircraft
- SS Taube, a later name of the 964 GRT coaster SS Jean Marie

== Other uses ==
- Taube Museum of Art, Downtown Minot, North Dakota
- The Taube Foundation for Jewish Life & Culture, in Belmont, California
- Die Taube, a 1988 novella by Patrick Süskind

== See also ==
- Daub (disambiguation)
- Tauber (surname)
