= Teyber =

Teyber is a surname.

The most prominent people with the surname were an Austrian family of musicians. They also spelled their name many different ways, including Deiber, Taiber, Taube, Tauber, Täuber, Tayber, Teiber, and Teuber. Notable members of this family include:

- Matthäus Teyber (c. 1711–1785), violinist and court musician
- Anton Teyber (1756–1822), organist, pianist, Kapellmeister and composer, son of Matthäus
- Elena Asachi, née Teyber, (1789–1877), pianist, singer and composer, daughter of Anton
- Franz Teyber (1758–1810), Austrian organist, Kapellmeister and composer, son of Matthäus
- Elisabeth Teyber (1744–1816), operatic soprano, daughter of Matthäus
- Therese Teyber (1760–1830), operatic soprano, daughter of Matthäus
- Andreas Teuber (1942–2021), American philosophy professor and actor
- Klaus Teuber (1952–2023), German dental technician and boardgame designer
- Sven Teuber (born 1982), German politician (SPD)

== See also ==
- Tauber (surname)
- Taubes (surname)
