= Therese Teyber =

Austrian operatic soprano

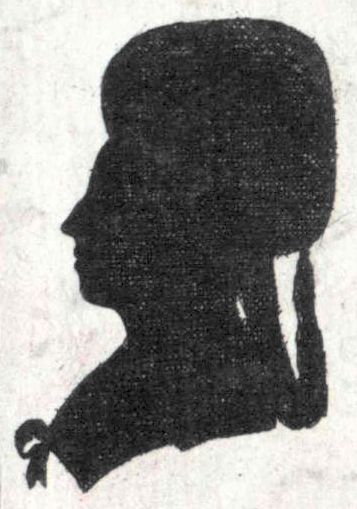
Therese Teyber, c. 1785

Therese Barbara Alberta Teyber (bap. 15 October 1760 – 15 April 1830) was an Austrian operatic soprano.

== Life ==
=== Education ===
Therese was born in Vienna to Matthäus Teyber and Theresia Riedl. The composer Giuseppe Bonno was witness to her parents' marriage and may have been Therese's childhood music instructor. The contralto Vittoria Tesi and the composer Antonio Salieri may also have been her teachers.

From 1773, the Teyber and Mozart families were closely connected.

=== Career ===
In September of 1778, Therese made her debut as Fiametta in Maximilian Ulbrich's Frühling und Liebe. The premiere production was with the Nationalsingspiel in the Vienna Burgtheater, of whose Italian opera company she was a member from 1783–5. During her tenure, Therese also performed in concerts for the Tonkünstler-Societät. Her final appearance was in March 1784 as Sara in Haydn's Il ritorno di Tobia.

Therese created the role of Blonde in Mozart's Die Entführung aus dem Serail (1782). The following year, the composer had planned for Therese to premiere the role of Metilde in Lo sposo deluso, but the opera was never completed. On 23 March 1783, Therese sang 'Parto, m'affretto' from Lucio Silla in Mozart's benefit concert at the Burgtheater. Mozart reciprocated by performing the following week in Therese's Burgtheater concert. Both concerts were attended by the Emperor.

Therese Teyber was largely popular as an actress and singer, though she was compensated far less than her other female counterparts, like Nancy Storace. She performed both Singspiele and operas, many of which were produced at the Kärntnertortheater where she was a member of the German opera company from 1785–91. In addition to those of Mozart, Teyber was featured in the operas of Salieri, Umlauf, Gluck, Paisiello, and others. In 1786, Therese married the tenor Philipp Ferdinand Arnold, with whom she had sung in Frühling und Liebe eight years prior. Together, Therese and Ferdinand toured Germany, Poland, and the Baltic region in concert.

For a number of the final performances of Don Giovanni in Vienna in 1788, Therese probably replaced Luisa Laschi as Zerlina.

== Family ==
Therese's father, Matthäus, was a violinist. He served in the chapel of Elisabeth Christine, the widow of Charles VI. Later, he worked as a theater and court musician. Therese's older sister, Elisabeth, was also an operatic soprano. Their brothers Anton and Franz were both musicians, composers, and Kapellmeisters. Anton's daughter Elena had a modest career as a performer and composer. In 1827, she married the Moldavian composer Gheorghe Asachi. Gheorghe adopted Elena's children from her first marriage, including her daughter, Hermione.

Therese has been confused with Maria Anna Tauber, to whom she is not related. The two sopranos performed together in Ulbrich's Frühling und Liebe in 1778.
