= Kaddon pika =

Kådun pika
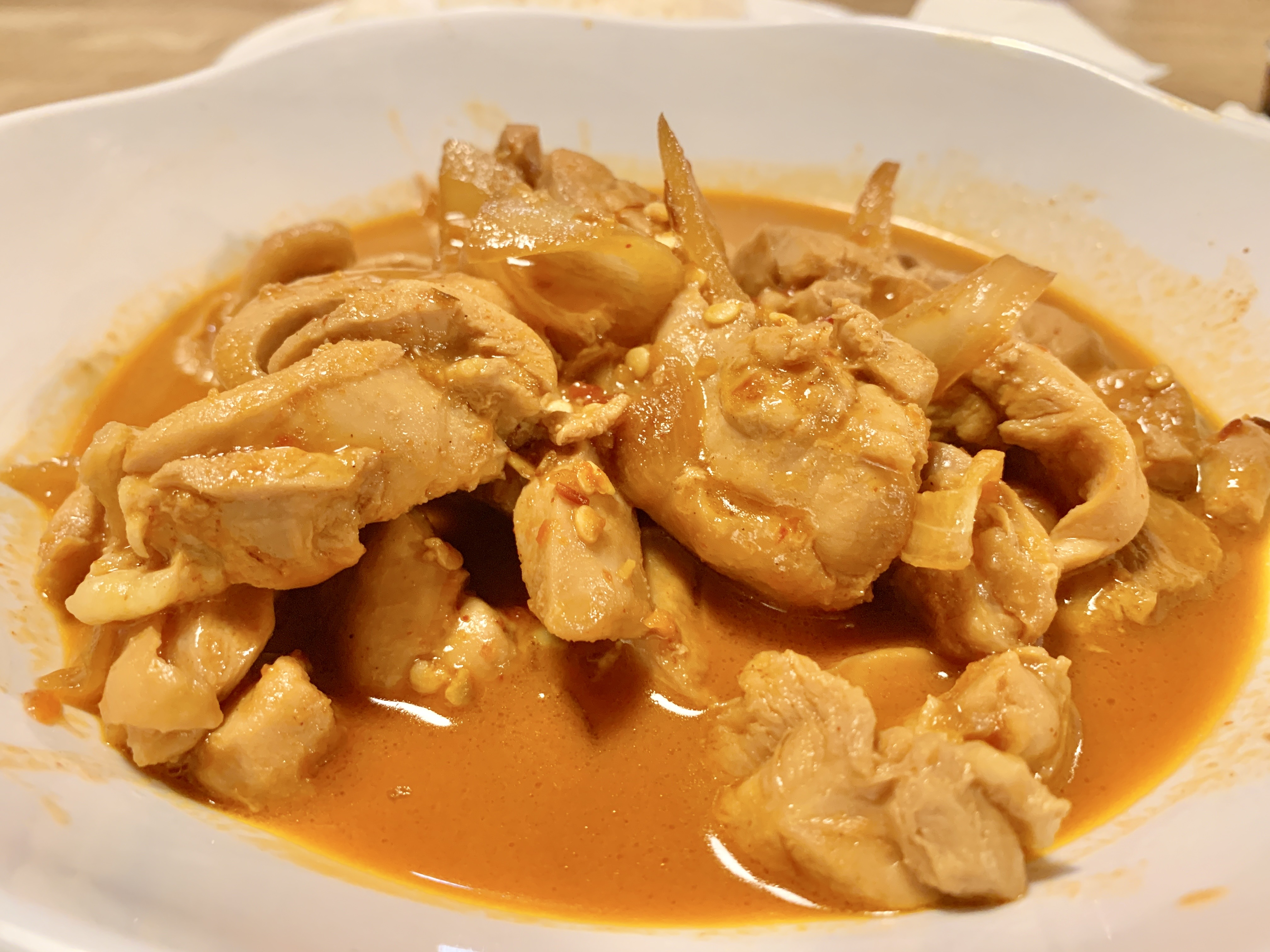
- Kaddon pika
- Alternative names: Kadon pika, Kadun pika
- Type: Stew
- Place of origin: United States
- Region or state: Guam
- Main ingredients: soy sauce, vinegar, donne' (hot pepper), garlic, and onions

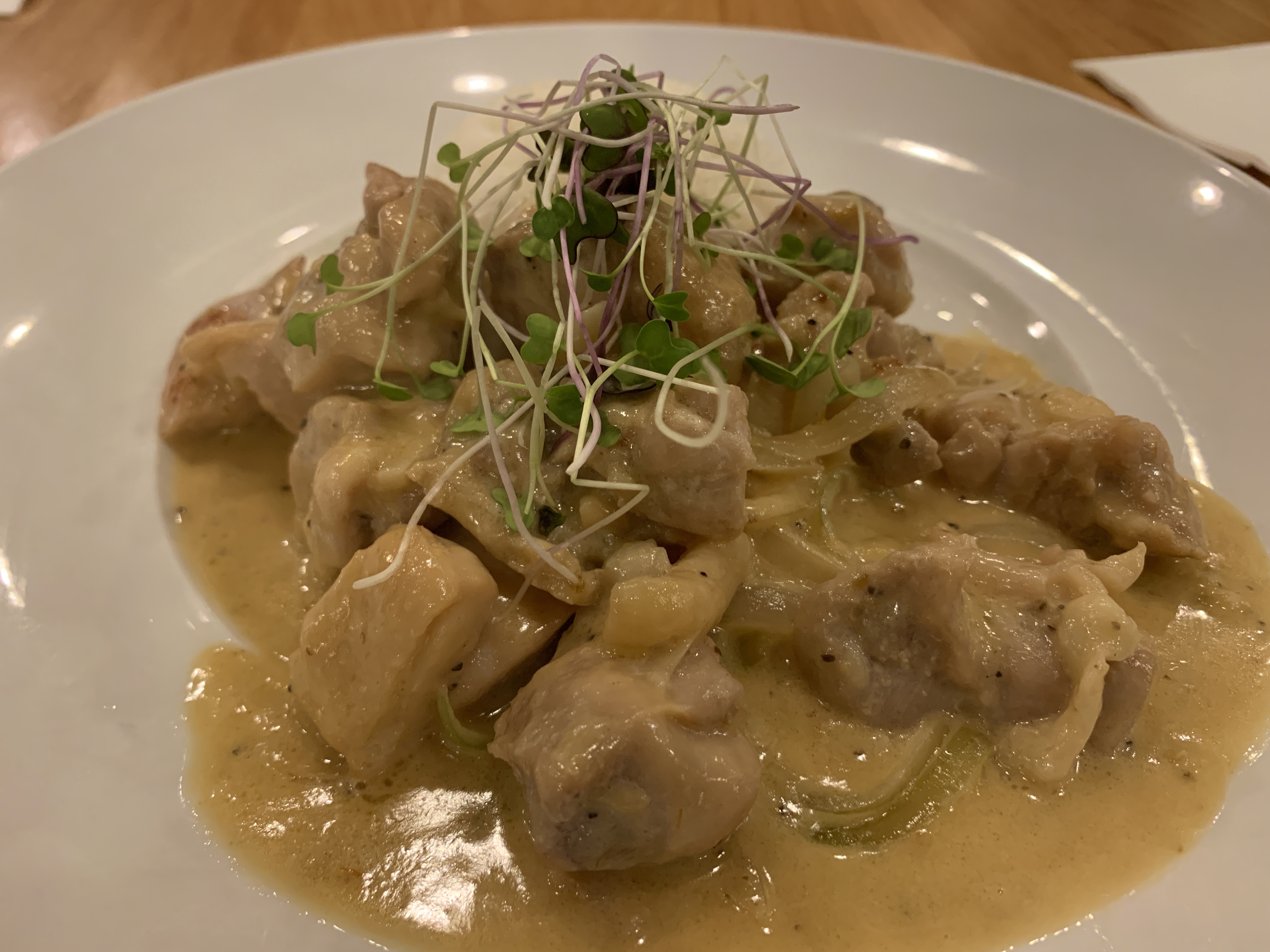
Kaddon pika

Kaddon pika is a Chamorro dish where chicken is stewed in soy sauce, vinegar, donne' (hot pepper), garlic, and onions in one pot. It can also contain coconut milk. "Kado" refers to a protein cooked in liquid and can be soup or stew consistency. "Pika" means spicy in Chamorro. It has a savory, spicy, and sour flavor combination. The meat of a whole stewing chicken (or stewing hen) is desirable because it adds a depth of flavor that parts of fryer chicken or chicken drumettes do not have. The stewing hen meat requires a longer cooking time or a pressure cooker because it is less tender. For one stewing hen, one bulb of chopped garlic and one medium onion would be generous ratio of vegetables. It is often served with steamed rice, but can be served with vegetable dishes such as spinach, pumpkin tips, lettuce, or cabbage. Gollai hågon suni (a Chamorro dish traditionally made from taro leaves coconut milk) or gollai suni kalamasa (pumpkin tips) could also be served with the kaddon pika. The dish can be high in sodium due to its soy sauce. The chicken skin contributes to the total saturated fat content in the dish. It is similar to chicken adobo and estufao (chicken cooked in soy sauce and vinegar) except it contains the donne' (and sometimes coconut milk). Although it is usually a home cooked meal, it can be found at restaurants such as King's or food stalls.

== See also ==
- Cuisine of the Mariana Islands
