= Elisabeth Teyber =

- Born: 16 September 1744; Vienna
- Baptised: 16 September 1744
- Died: 9 May 1816 (aged 71); Vienna
- Occupation: Opera singer
- Parent(s): Matthäus Teyber
- Relatives: Therese Teyber, Franz Teyber, Anton Teyber, Maria Barbara Francesca Teyber, Friedrich Teyber

Maria Elisabeth Victoria Vincentia Teyber, Marchesa de Venier (16 September 1744 – 9 May 1816) was an Austrian opera singer. A soprano, she had prominent roles in several operas by Johann Adolph Hasse.

== Biography ==
Elisabeth Teyber was born in Vienna in 1744, the daughter of Matthäus Teyber, the patriarch of the Teyber family of musicians and singers. She studied under Hesse, Vittoria Tesi, and likely Giuseppe Bonno. Her career began in Vienna in 1762. She appeared as Ladoice in the 1763 staging of Hasse's opera Siroe, re di Persia, as Circe in the premiere of Christoph Willibald Gluck's Telemaco o sia L'Isola di Circe in 1765, and as Elpinice in the 1767 staging of Hasse's La Partenope. (Leopold Mozart, in a 1767 letter, expressed disapproval of her performance in the latter.) She spent the next decade as a prima donna in various Italian cities. This was interrupted by a year in Russia in 1770, as prima donna of the Court Opera under Tommaso Traetta. Her performances included Traetta's Antigono, staged to celebrate the anniversary of the coronation of Catherine the Great.

In 1770, she married Marchese Leonardo Venier à St. Felice, a Venetian nobleman who died in 1781. Elisabeth Teyber died on 9 May 1816 in Vienna.
