= Estufao =

Chamorro meat dish

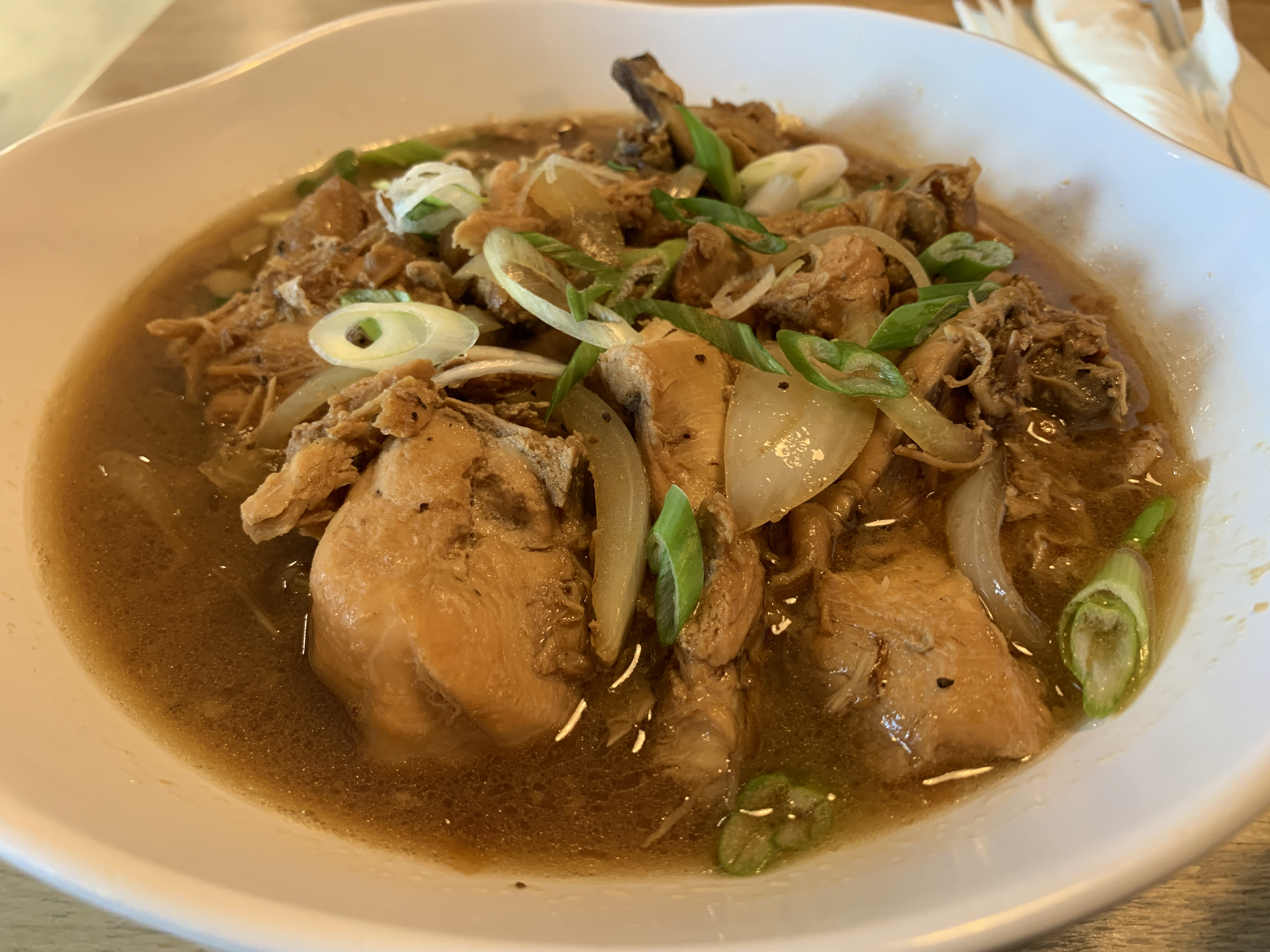
- Estufao
- Type: Stew
- Place of origin: United States
- Region or state: Guam
- Main ingredients: soy sauce, vinegar, and spices

Estufao is a Chamorro dish where chunks of meat are stewed in water, vinegar, soy sauce, spices, and garlic. It is similar to Filipino adobo and kaddon pika. It is a versatile dish, so various meats such as beef, chicken, venison, or pork can be used. Thus, recipes are often different from one cook to another. Spices such as bay leaves and salt can be added. The ingredients (other than the oil and water) are combined and allowed to marinate. Then, the mixture is cooked on oil until browned slightly. Water is added, and the mixture is cooked over low heat until the meat is tender. Corn starch is often added to thicken the stew. The meat and gravy can be served separated or together. The dish is often served with steamed white rice and fina'denne'.

== See also ==
- Cuisine of the Mariana Islands
