= Torresmos =

Portuguese pork dish

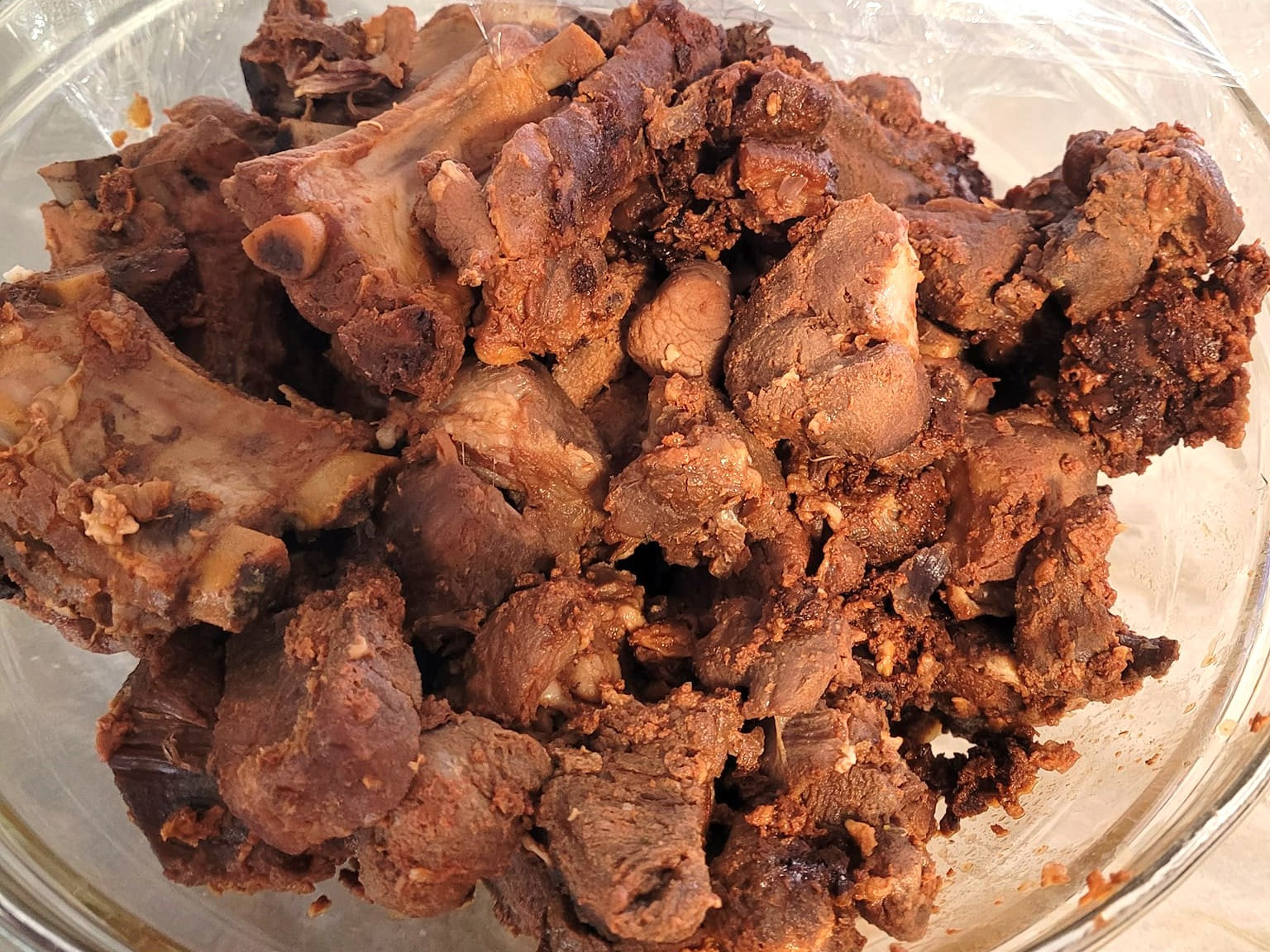
- Seasoned pork cooked until dry
- Alternative names: Torresmos em Molho de Fígado
- Type: Stew
- Course: Entree
- Place of origin: Portugal
- Region or state: Azores
- Main ingredients: Pork, spare ribs, bacon, liver, garlic, salt, peppercorn, wine
- Ingredients generally used: Paprika, bay leaf, cloves, cinnamon
- Variations: Carne de vinha d'alhos
- Similar dishes: Vindaloo, adobo

Torresmos (lit. 'cracklings') is a pork dish from the Azores. While the dish is named after the pork cracklings, it also refers to the cooking method and meat preservation of the dish created prior to refrigeration.

While the cracklings are made the same day a pig is butchered, the dish itself does not entirely contain cracklings but is made with the other pork parts that are made in large batches and stored in clay jars to be consumed throughout the year.

Torresmos is made of various pig parts such as pork butt, spareribs, pork belly, and liver. The pork parts are seasoned with garlic, salt, and various spices―pepper, paprika, bay leaf, cloves, cinnamon― and stewed with wine until dry. The pork is then transferred to a large earthen jar with enough lard to cover the meat. Throughout the year, pieces of meat can be taken out of the jars with a little of the lard to be pan-fried until brown or crispy.

Torresmos is similar to carne de vinha d'alhos. However, unlike torresmos the pork is previously cooked and reheated prior to consumption, while the pork in carne de vinha d'alhos is typically pickled (in wine or vinegar) for long-term preservation before cooking.

== See also ==
- Adobo – Iberian culinary style
- Carne de vinha d'alhos – Portuguese dish, of meat marinated with garlic and wine
- Daube – French stew of beef braised in wine and garlic
