= Sole meunière =

French fish dish

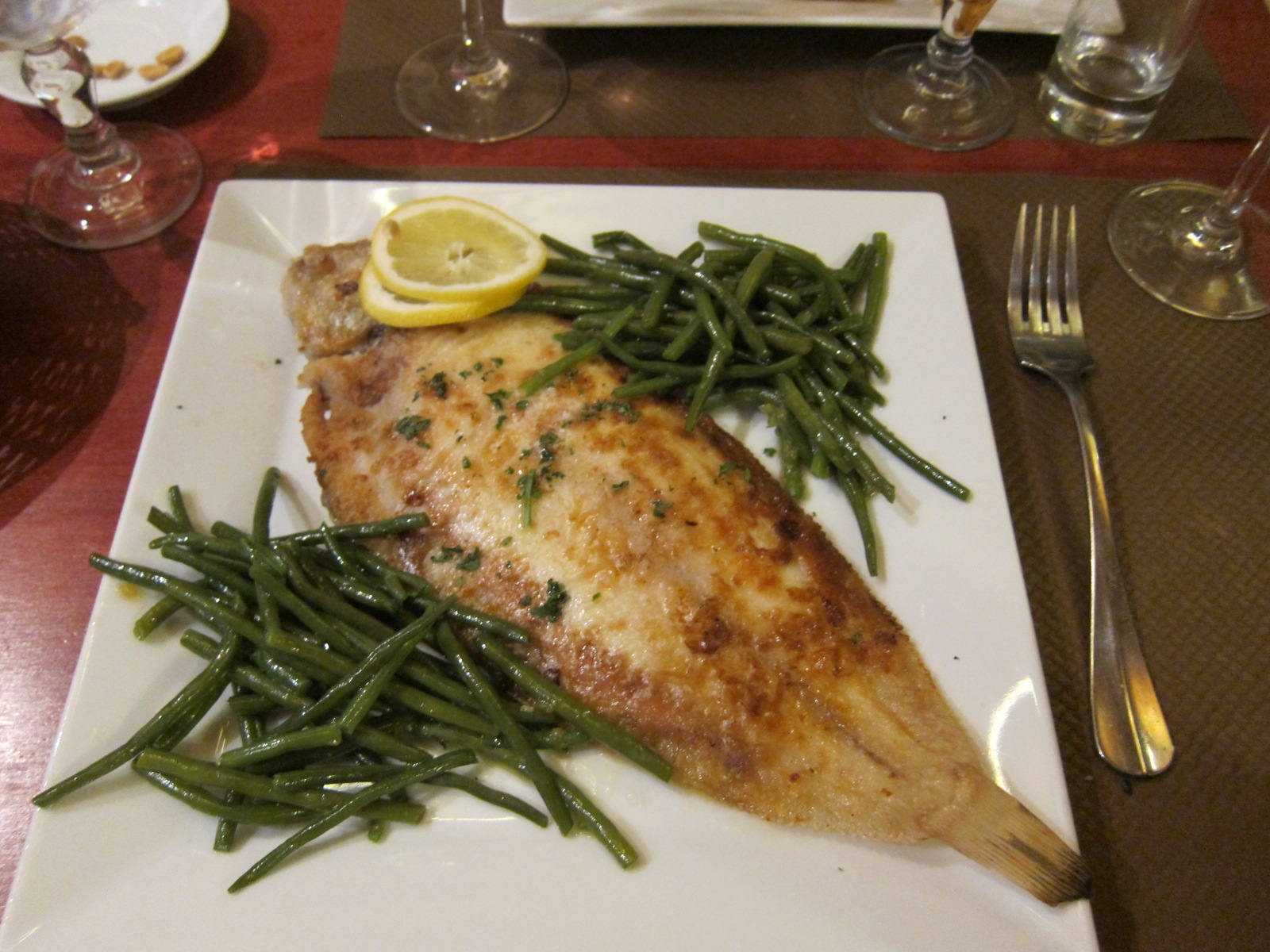
- Alternative names: Sole à la meunière
- Type: Fish
- Place of origin: France
- Main ingredients: Sole, butter, lemon juice, parsley

Sole meunière (or sole à la meunière) is a classic French fish dish consisting of sole – floured and fried – and served with hot melted butter, lemon juice, and parsley. Many recipes specify Dover sole, but the technique can be used with other similar flatfish.

== Etymology and background ==
The term à la meunière translates literally as "in the style of the miller's wife". (Note: Or, as Felicity Cloake points out, "in the style of the miller" if the miller is not automatically assumed to be a man.) It means that the dish, usually fish, is first dusted with flour and then cooked in butter. Anything cooked à la meunière is also generally sprinkled with lemon juice and chopped parsley. The derivation is the late Latin molinarius (a miller).

== Composition ==
I am always rather surprised when I read in books and articles that to cook fish à la meunière is one of the simplest of achievements. Simple in conception certainly; but in execution, no.

— Elizabeth David,
French Provincial Cooking (1960).

The dish named sole meunière has varied over the years. In his 1846 cookery book The Gastronomic Regenerator, Alexis Soyer leaves the skin on the fish and rubs salt and chopped onions into it, before grilling it whole and, once cooked, adding a sauce of melted butter with lemon juice and cayenne pepper. The method most widely used today is similar to that given by Auguste Escoffier in 1907: the dark skin is removed from a whole sole; the fish is then coated with flour, fried in butter, sprinkled with lemon juice and chopped parsley, and served with very hot melted butter poured over it.

There are minor variations in the method of cooking. Some cooks, like Craig Claiborne, suggest soaking the sole in milk before flouring and cooking; others, such as Marcel Boulestin, insist that the fish must be completely dried with a cloth before flouring. Some authorities call for filets of sole, but the majority call for the fish to be cooked whole (although some suggest removing the head). Elizabeth David specifies clarified butter for frying the fish, and Escoffier advises "for small fish, ordinary butter can be used, but for larger ones, the use of clarified butter is to be preferred". Authorities differ about whether to use salted or unsalted butter. Marcus Wareing prefers to fry the sole in oil, and Paul Bocuse recommends a mixture of olive oil and butter.

A more marked departure from the norm is reported by Patricia Wells in a 2003 collection of Parisian chefs' recipes. The chef of the well-known fish restaurant Le Dôme leaves the dark skin on the fish (as Soyer does) and omits the flouring.

Although the classic version is made with Dover sole, Felicity Cloake comments in a 2021 survey of sole meunière recipes that the method is suitable for other flatfish, including megrim and lemon sole.

== Notes, references and sources ==
=== Sources ===
- Bocuse, Paul (1985). The Cuisine of Paul Bocuse. London: Granada. ISBN 0246127546.
- Boulestin, Marcel (1931). What Shall We Have To-day?. London: Heinemann. OCLC 499225260.
- Claiborne, Craig (1973) [1969]. A Kitchen Primer. London: Penguin. ISBN 978-0-14-046172-5.
- David, Elizabeth (2008) [1960]. French Provincial Cooking. London: Folio Society. OCLC 809349711.
- Escoffier, Auguste (1934) [1907]. Ma Cuisine. Paris: Flammarion. OCLC 981486233.
- Soyer, Alexis (1846). The Gastronomic Regenerator. London: Simpkin and Marshall. OCLC 1505372.
- Wells, Patricia (2001). The Paris Cookbook. New York: HarperCollins. ISBN 978-0-06-018469-8.

== See also ==
- Meunière sauce
