= Carne de vinha d'alhos =

Portuguese dish of meat marinated with garlic and wine

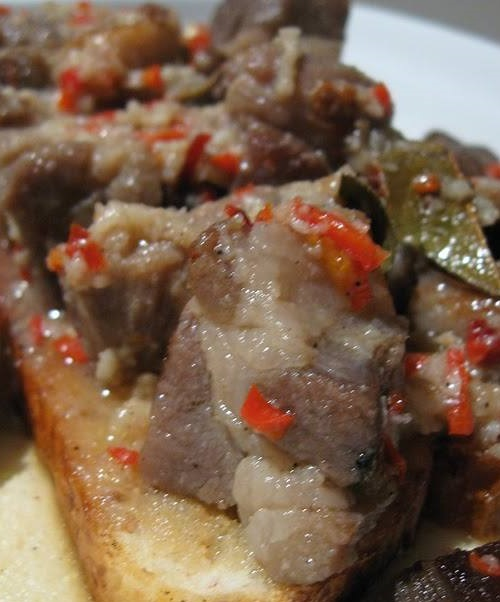
- Served over bread
- Alternative names: Vinha d'alhos, vina dosh, vinyoo dalyge, pickled pork, garlic pork, calvinadage
- Type: Stew
- Course: Entree
- Place of origin: Portugal
- Region or state: Madeira, Azores
- Associated cuisine: Portuguese cuisine
- Serving temperature: Hot
- Main ingredients: Pork, garlic, wine, vinegar, paprika
- Variations: Torresmos
- Similar dishes: Vindaloo, adobo

Carne de vinha d'alhos ("meat of wine with garlic") is a Portuguese dish prepared using a marinade of salt, paprika, chili paste, wine or vinegar, and garlic. Originating in Minho, it is traditionally served at Christmas time in Madeira.

Vinha d'alhos was taken by people from Portugal and its archipelagos Madeira and the Azores to Hawaii in the late 1800s. In the Americas, it is known as "pickled pork" or "vinyoo dalyge". In Trinidad and Tobago and Guyana, where it was introduced in the early 19th century, it is also known as "garlic pork" or calvinadage.

The curry dish vindaloo is an Indian interpretation of carne de vinha d'alhos, which was introduced in the early 16th century to the former Portuguese colony of Goa in Portuguese India. In Goa, the dish is called vindalho, closer to its Portuguese counterpart, and is likewise usually made with pork.

== See also ==
- Adobo – Iberian culinary style
- Daube – French stew of beef braised in wine and garlic
- Filipino adobo – Filipino dish of meat cooked in soy sauce and vinegar
