= Amandine (garnish) =

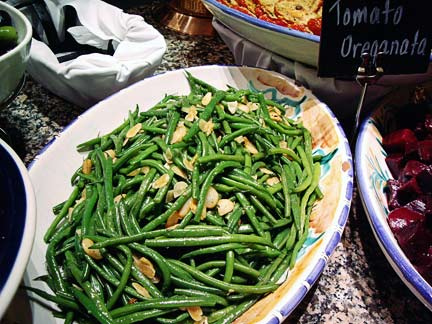
Green beans

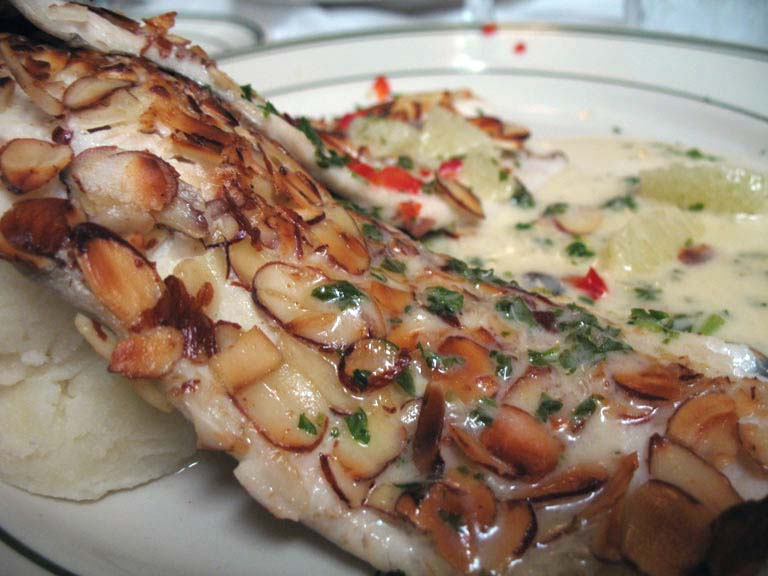
Trout

Amandine, sometimes Anglicised as almondine, is a culinary term indicating a garnish of almonds. Dishes of this sort are usually cooked with butter and seasonings, then sprinkled with whole (or flaked) toasted almonds. The term is often spelled almondine in American cookbooks.

Green beans, fish, and asparagus are frequently served amandine.

== See also ==
- List of almond dishes
- List of cooking techniques
- Meuniere sauce

== External sources ==
- Merriam-Webster definition
- Green Beans Amandine
