= Taub =

Taub is a surname. Notable people with the surname include:

- Abraham H. Taub (1911–1999), American mathematician and physicist
- Ari Taub (wrestler) (born 1971), Canadian wrestler
- Ben Taub (1889–1982), American philanthropist and medical benefactor
- Daniel Taub (born 1962), Israeli diplomat
- David Rosenmann-Taub (born 1927), Chilean poet, musician, and artist
- Edward Taub (born 1931), American behavioral neuroscientist
- Gadi Taub (born 1965), Israeli historian, author, screenwriter, and political commentator
- Gypsy Taub (born 1969), Russian American activist
- Henry Taub (1927–2011), American businessman and philanthropist
- Leandro Taub (born 1983), Argentine actor and author
- Richard Taub (1937–2020), American sociologist
- Robert Taub (born 1955), American concert pianist

== Fictional characters ==
- Chris Taub, fictional character on the Fox medical drama House

== See also ==
- Taub., taxonomic author abbreviation of Paul Hermann Wilhelm Taubert (1862–1897), German botanist
- Daub (surname)
- Taube (surname)
- Taubes (surname)
