= Meunière sauce =

French brown butter, parsley, and lemon sauce

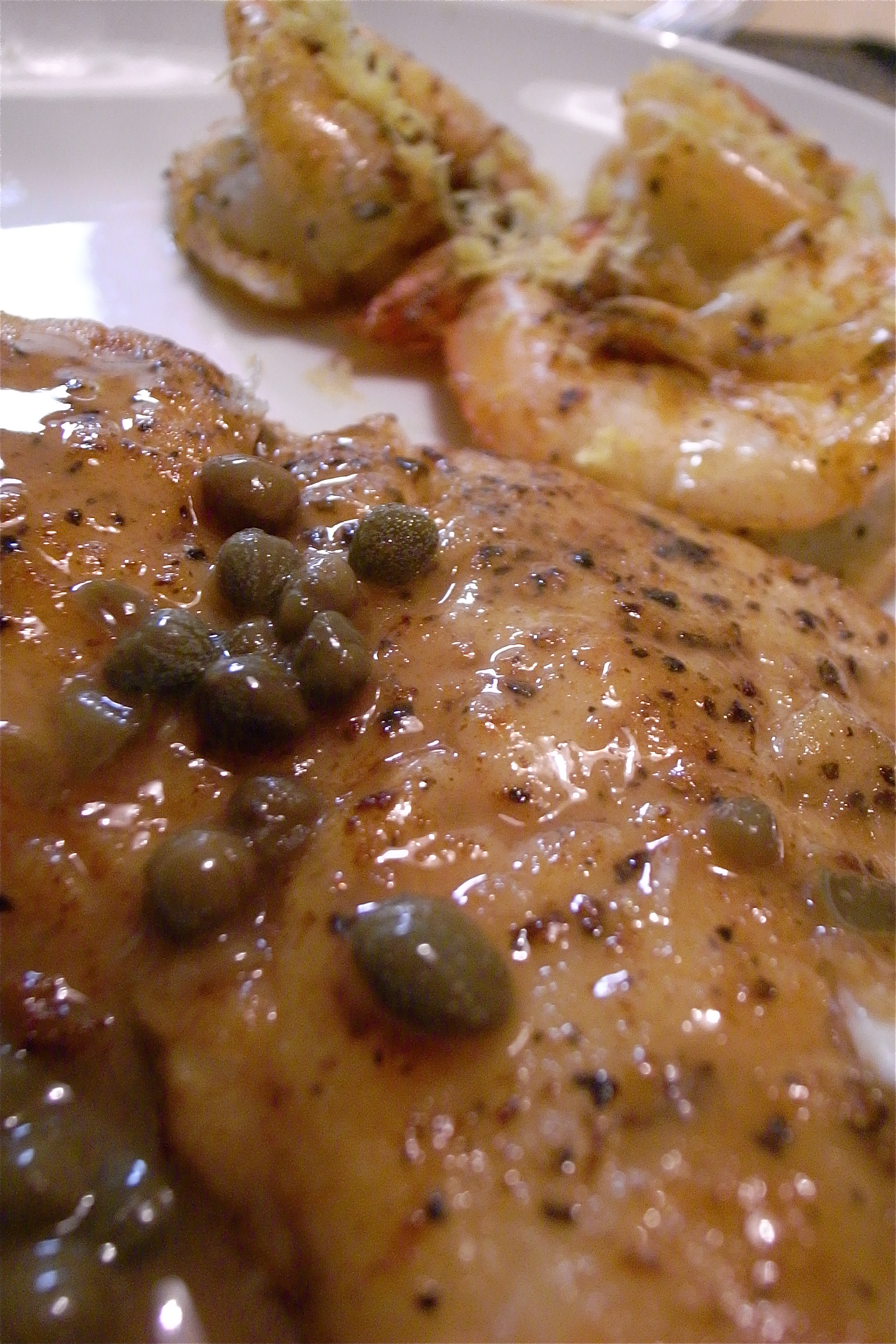
- Sole meunière piccata with capers and prawn
- Type: Sauce
- Place of origin: France
- Main ingredients: Brown butter, chopped parsley, and lemon

Meunière (UK: /ˌmɜːniˈɛər/, US: /ˌmʌn-/, French: [mønjɛʁ]; lit. 'miller's wife') is both a French sauce and a method of preparation, primarily for fish, consisting of brown butter, chopped parsley, and lemon. The name suggests a simple rustic nature, i.e. that to cook something à la meunière was originally to cook it by first dredging it in flour.

== Preparation ==
Meunière sauce is a variation on a brown butter sauce. While there is general agreement on the addition of parsley and lemon, some include ingredients such as Worcestershire sauce, red wine vinegar, or beef stock. Another common variation is to use pecans rather than almonds in an amandine.

== Fish meunière ==
There are two primary ways to prepare the fish (most popularly, sole or trout). One is by sautéing—first dredging the fish in seasoned flour (white flour or corn flour) and then cooking in a hot sauté pan with a small amount of clarified butter. The alternative method is to pan-fry or deep-fry the floured fish. In pan-frying, oil or a combination of oil and butter is used, up to perhaps 2 cm deep. Deep-frying is done in either a large fry pot or in a stand-alone deep fryer. The floured fish is completely submerged in the hot oil. The frying techniques result in a crisper texture, but the sauce must be made separately. The sautéed fish will have a softer skin by comparison, but allows for the possibility of creating the sauce à la minute after the fish has been removed by adding fresh butter, parsley, and lemon.

== Creole cuisine ==
Trout meunière and its variation trout amandine (speckled sea trout crusted in almonds, traditionally served with a meunière sauce) are standard dishes of New Orleans Creole cuisine. The abundance of seafood from the nearby Gulf of Mexico makes the simplicity of the meunière style appropriate. Galatoire's claims to sell more trout meunière amandine than any other dish. Soft-shell crab and redfish are also often available à la meunière. Oysters en brochette is typically served with a meunière sauce.

== See also ==
- Piccata
- Sole meunière
