= Daube glacé =

Jellied stew appetizer in New Orleans cuisine

Daube glacé is a jellied stew made with seasoned beef and veal stock molded into form. An American dish, it is served cold as an hors d'oeuvre on crackers or with garlic croutons. It can also be served on French bread with mayonnaise as a kind of po'boy. A traditional dish from New Orleans, it is listed on the Ark of Taste. Daube is a French beef stew. It is sold at Langenstein's grocery store.

== See also ==
- Head cheese
