= Telemaco (Gluck) =

Opera by Christoph Willibald Gluck

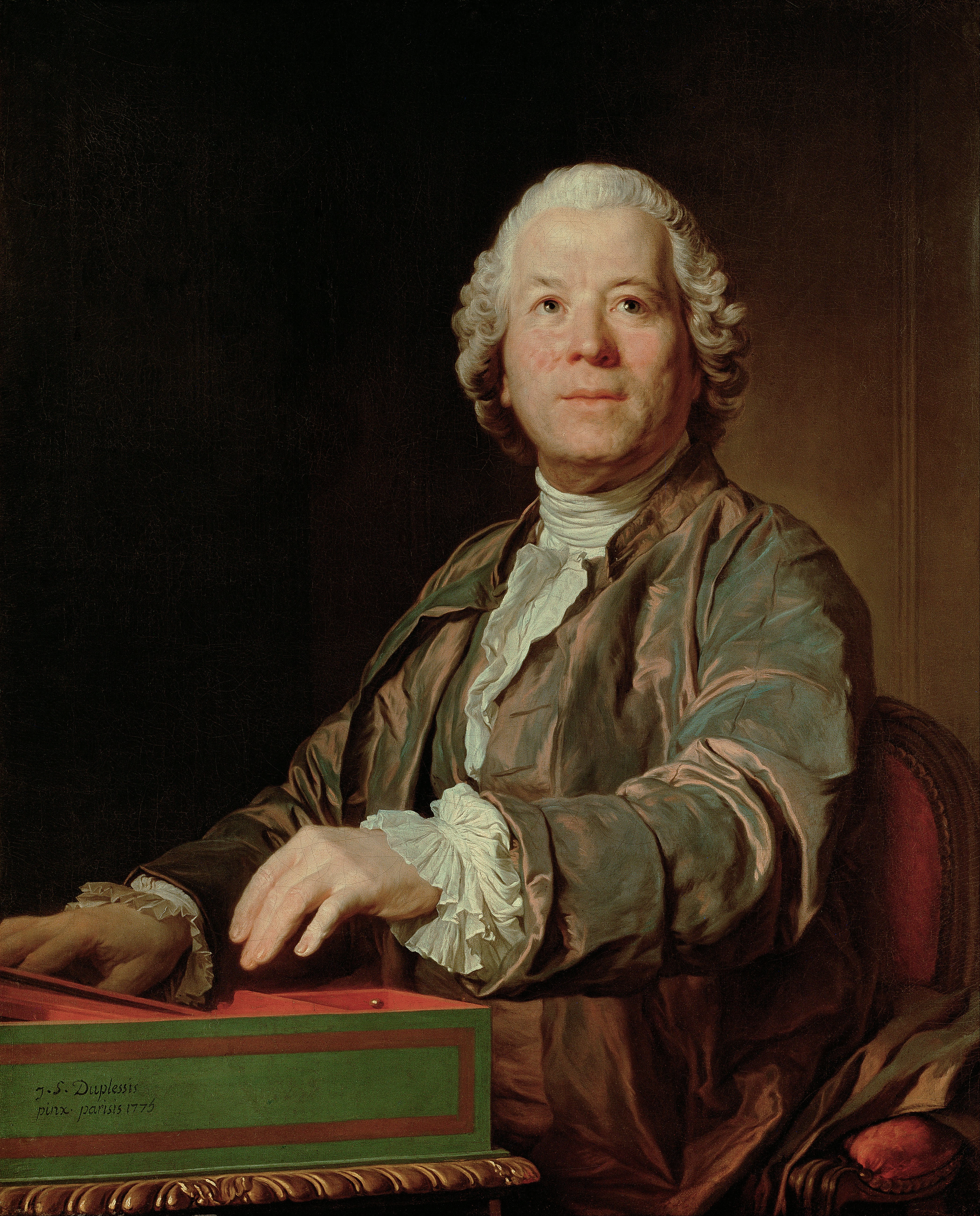
Portrait of Christoph Willibald Gluck by Joseph Duplessis (1775)

Telemaco, ossia L'isola di Circe (Telemachus, or Circe's Island) is an operatic dramma per musica in two acts by Christoph Willibald Gluck. The Italian libretto was written by Marco Coltellini after Carlo Sigismondo Capece's libretto for Scarlatti's 1718 opera Telemaco.

The opera was written for the wedding of the Emperor (to be) Joseph II and Princess Maria Josepha of Bavaria.

The first performance was at the Burgtheater in Vienna on 30 January 1765.

== Roles ==
Roles, voice types, premiere cast
Role	Voice type	Premiere cast, 30 January 1765
Ulisse	tenor	Giuseppe Tibaldi
Circe	soprano	Elisabeth Teyber
Telemaco	alto castrato	Gaetano Guadagni
Asteria	soprano	Rosa Tartaglini
Merione	soprano castrato	Luca Fabris
