= Langenstein's =

Local grocery store chain in New Orleans

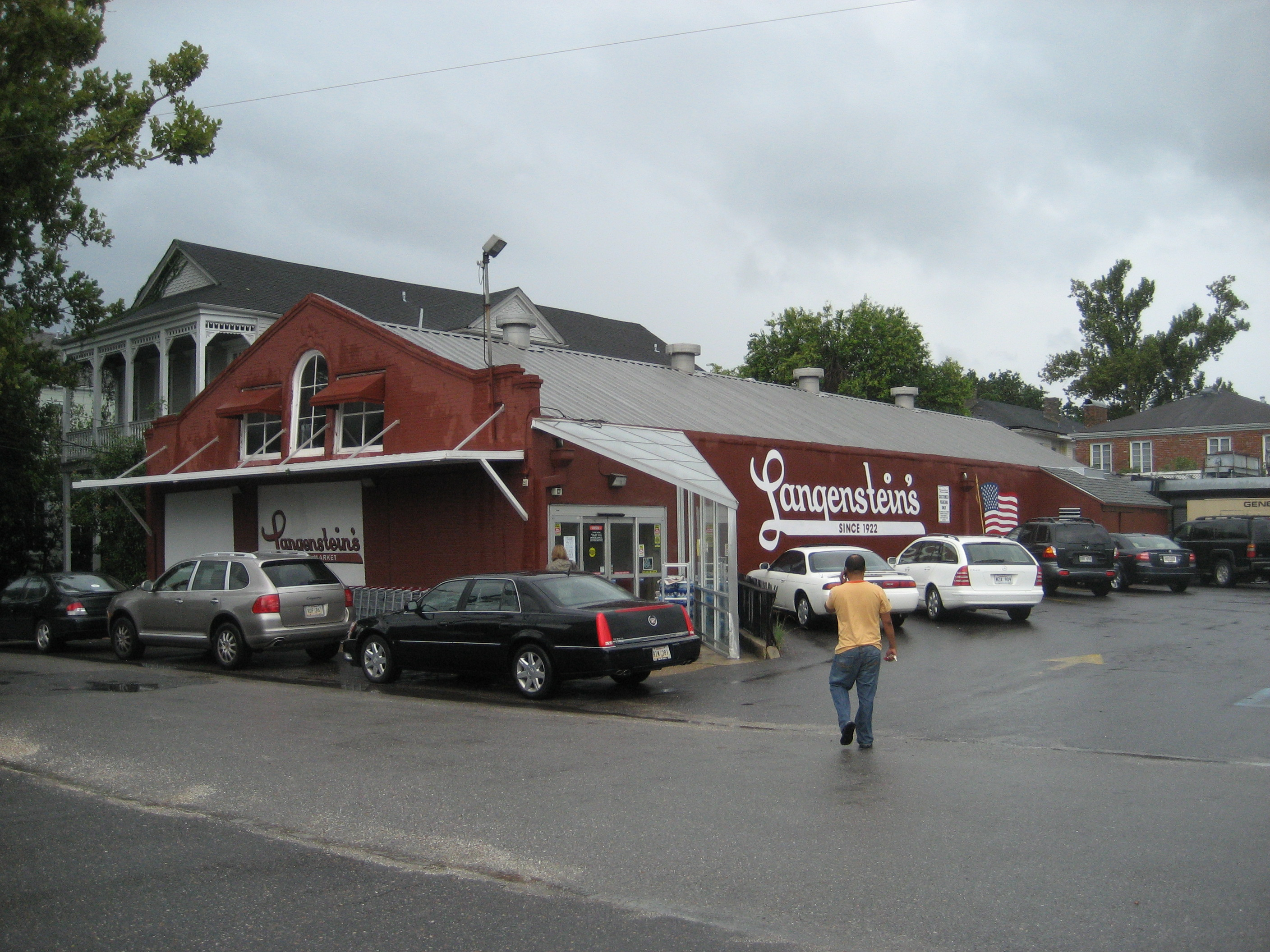
- Flagship store of Langenstein's grocery store chain as seen in 2007
- Company type: Private
- Industry: Grocery
- Founded: 1922
- Founders: Michael Langenstein
- Fate: Extant; To be sold
- Headquarters: New Orleans, Louisiana
- Number of locations: 3
- Areas served: New Orleans metropolitan area
- Website: www.langensteins.com

Langenstein's is a locally owned small grocery store chain in Greater New Orleans, Louisiana. Founded in 1922, the chain is the oldest full service grocery store in New Orleans.

In addition to standard groceries, the chain sells prepared foods, emphasizing regional specialities such as daube glacé, crawfish pie, crawfish etouffee, seafood gumbo, and grillades.

== History ==
Langenstein's was founded in New Orleans in 1922 by Michael Langenstein and his two sons, George Langenstein and Richard Langenstein, with the original store located at 1300 Arabella Street in Uptown New Orleans. In 1954 the store moved to a larger building at 1330 Arabella Street.

Beginning in 1994, Langenstein's opened satellite stores to serve the suburban New Orleans markets, with the first satellite store located at 800 Metairie Road in Metairie, Louisiana. The owners opened another location in 2015 at 122 Sauve Road in River Ridge, Louisiana. The owners used the original store location on Arabella Street to open Prytania Wine & Spirits.

As of 2022, Langenstein's is managed by fourth and fifth generation descendants of the founder. Michael Langenstein's granddaughter married, taking on the family name Lanaux from her husband, and her husband and their descendants became managers of the chain.

In April 2022, the owners of Langenstein's hosted a public centennial celebration at their Arabella Street location that included live music by Delfeayo Marsalis & the Uptown Jazz Orchestra.

In September 2025, Langenstein's management announced that its stores would be sold to Robért Fresh Market.

== Selected images ==
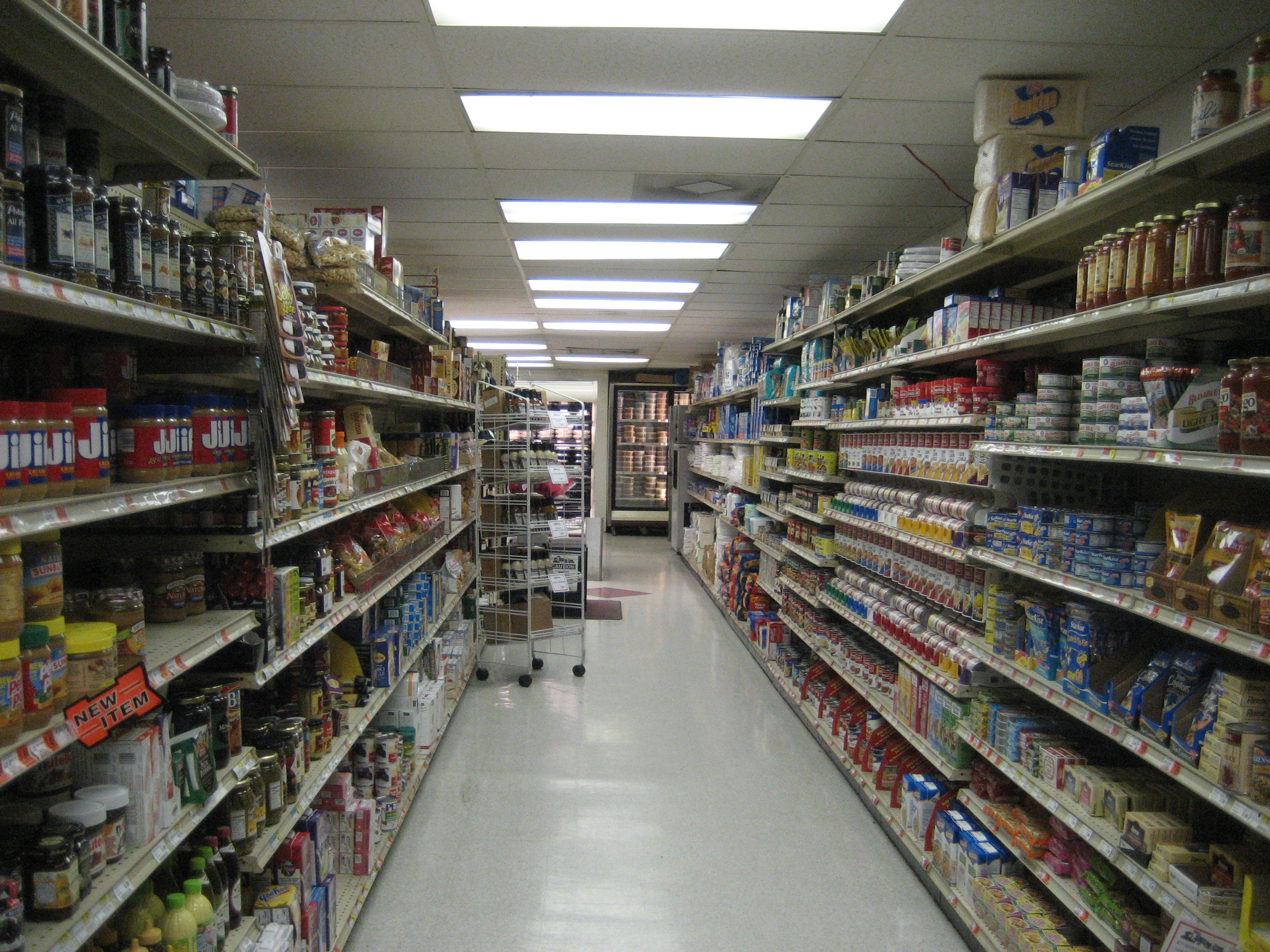
Aisle at Langenstein's Uptown location

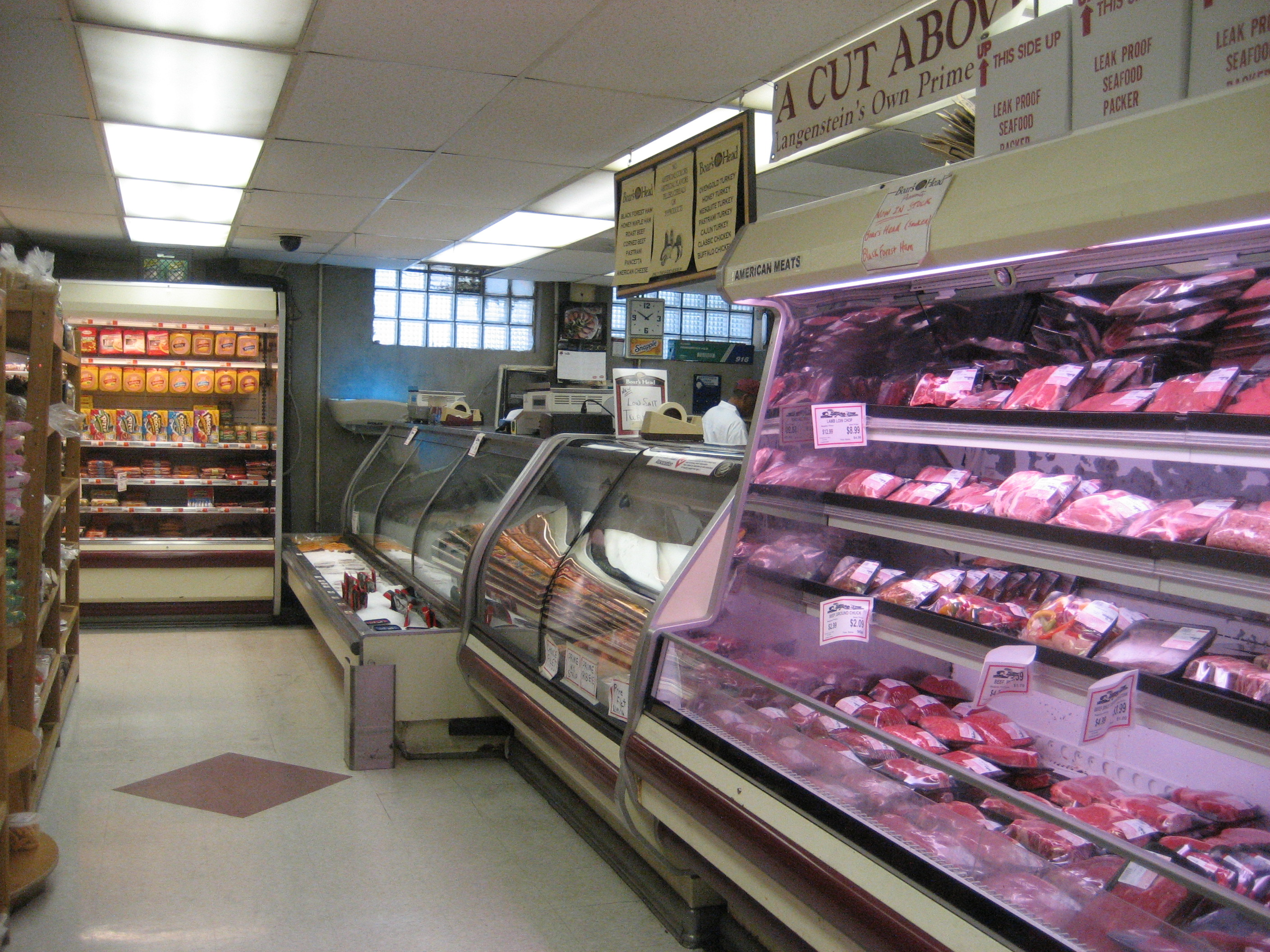
Butcher counter, Uptown, 2008

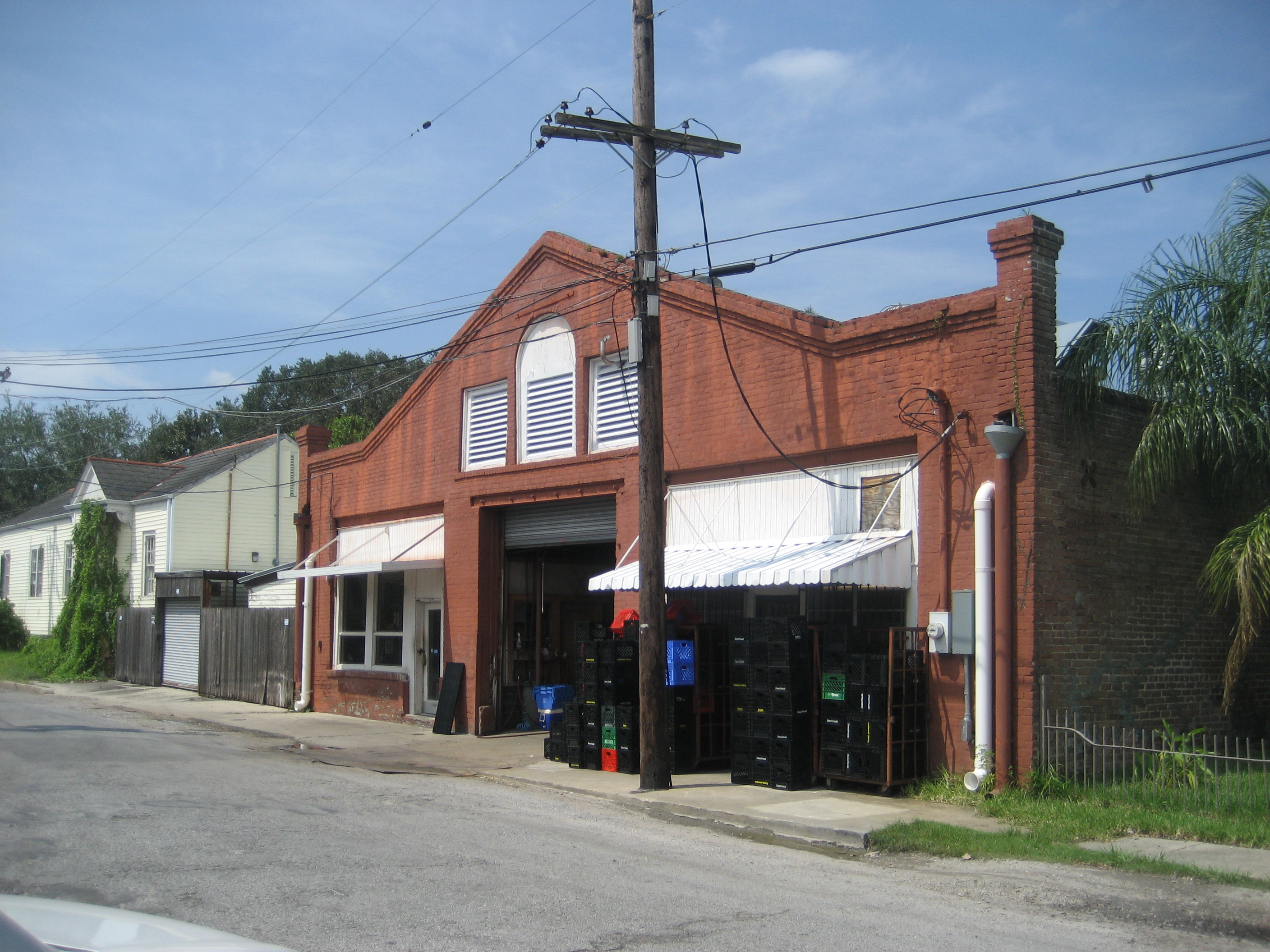
Warehouse for Langenstein's Uptown

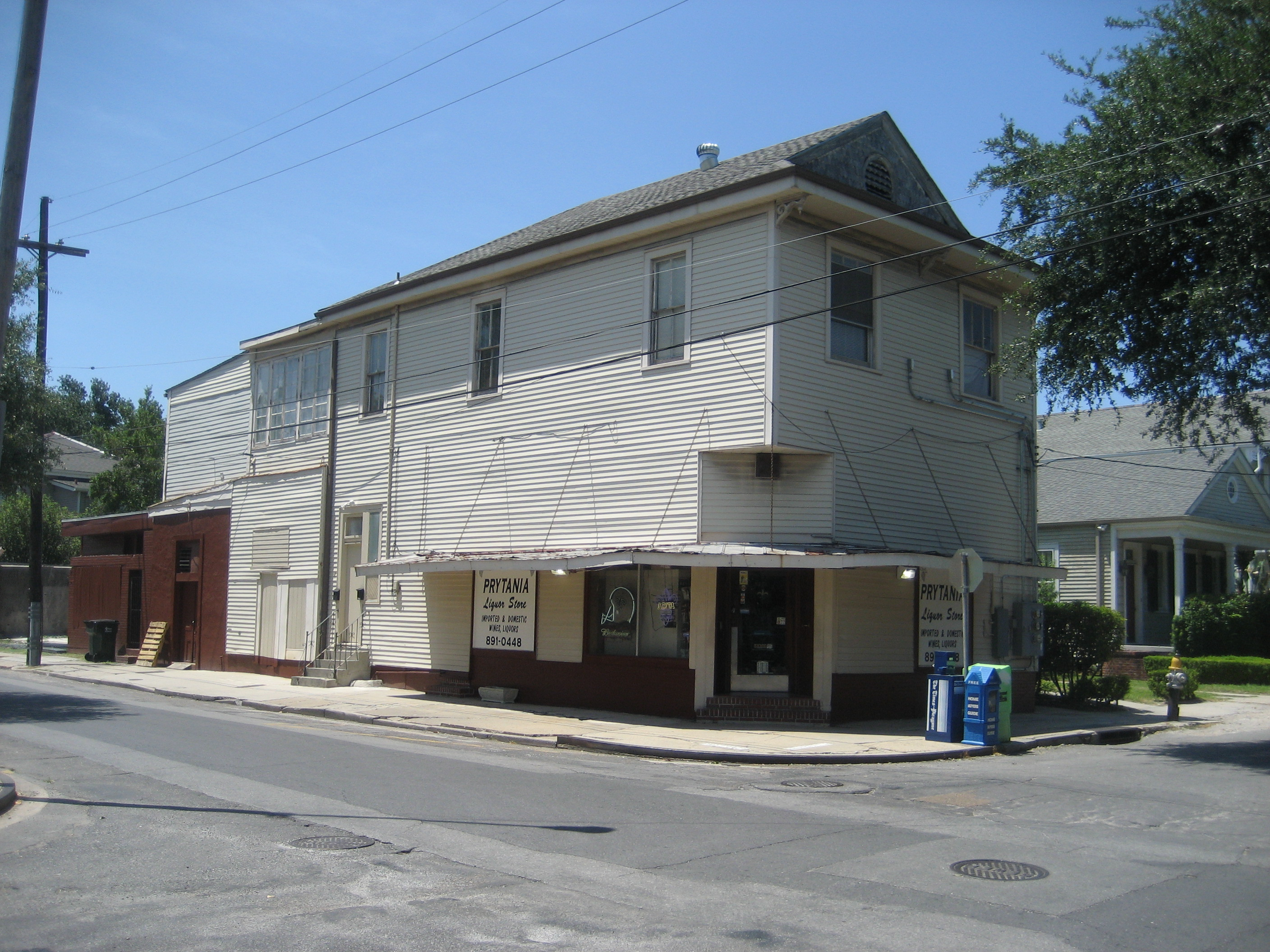
Prytania Wine & Spirits, at the original Langenstein's location

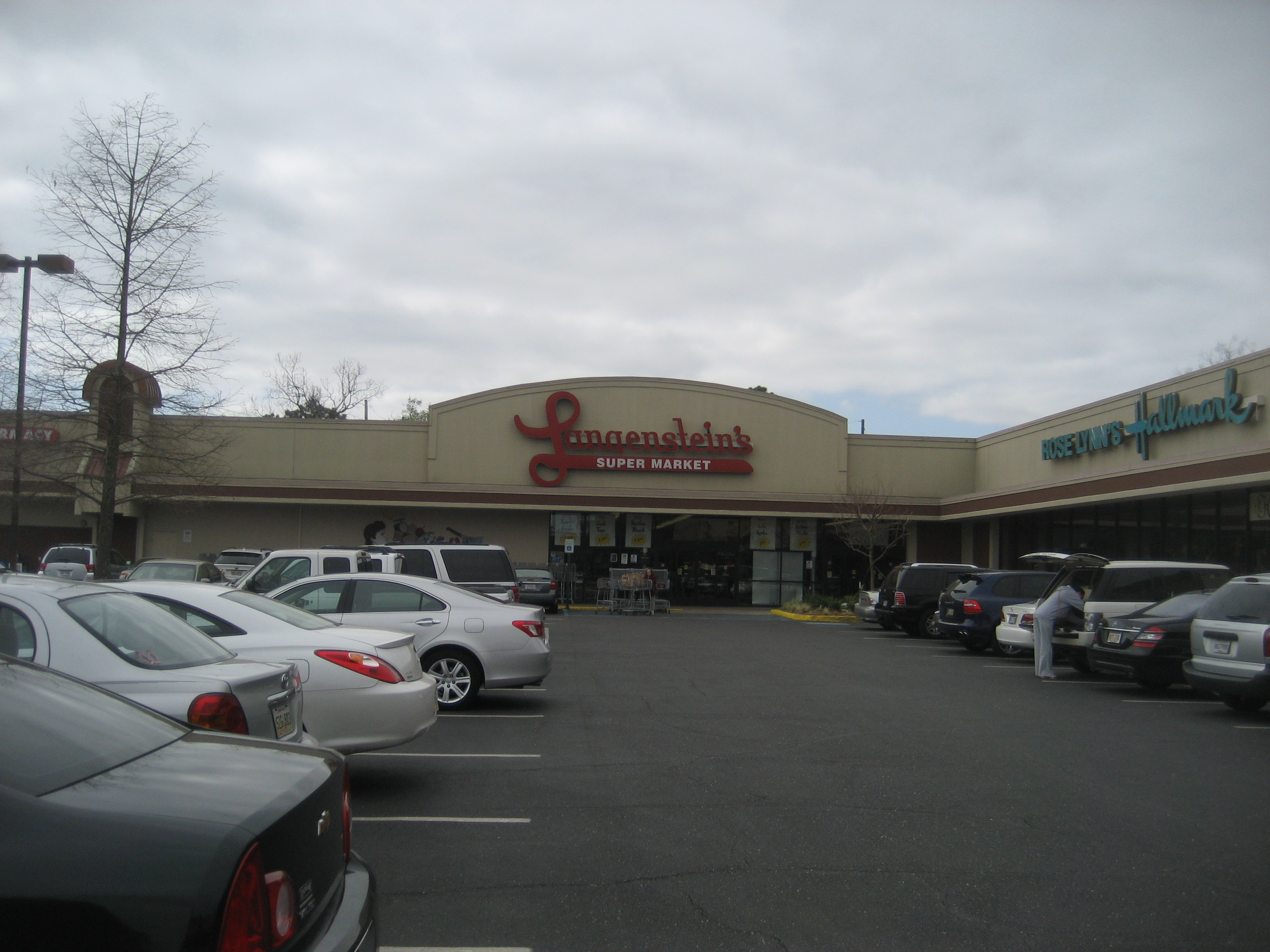
Langenstein's Metairie store exterior

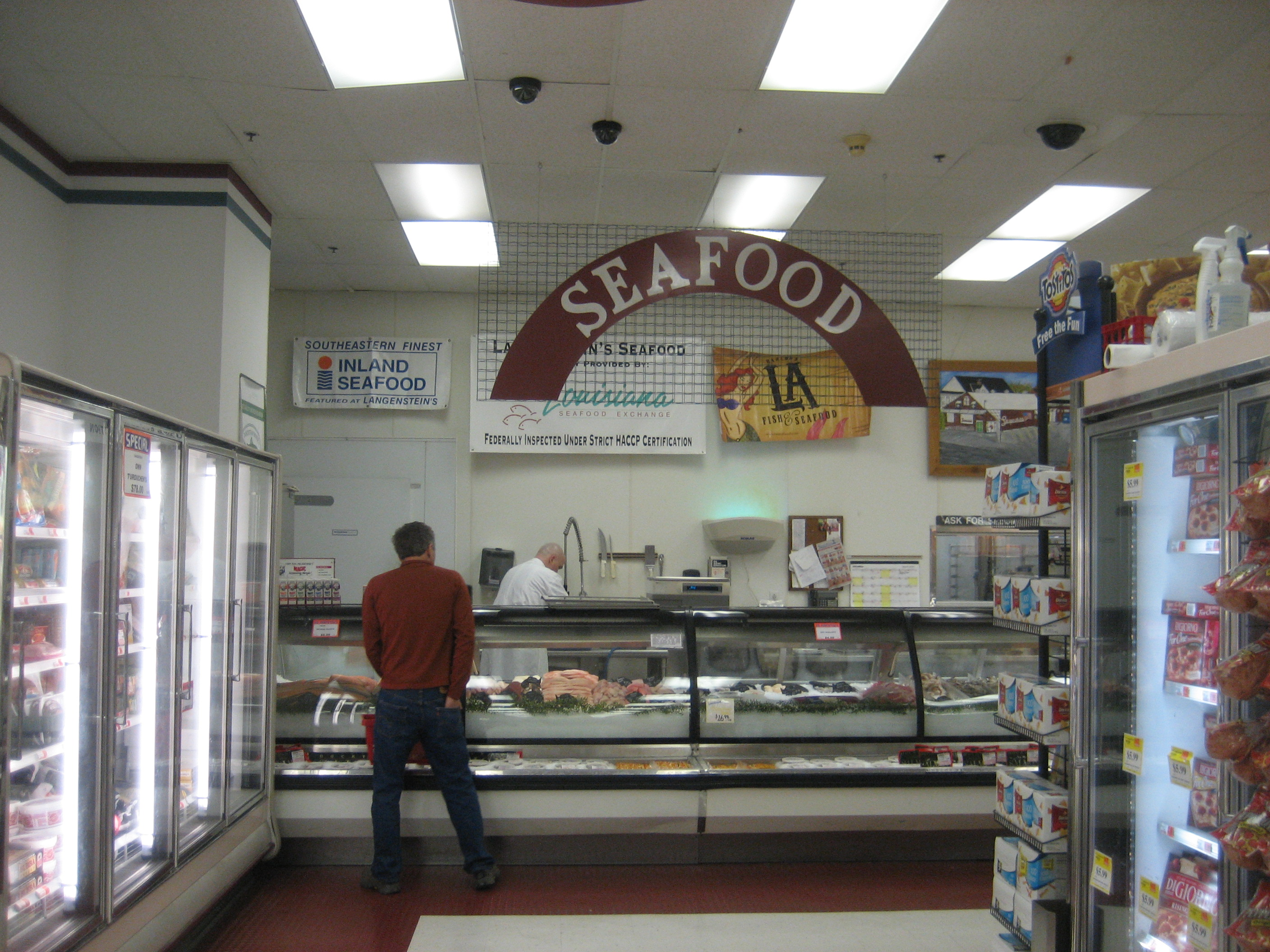
Seafood counter of Langenstein's Metairie

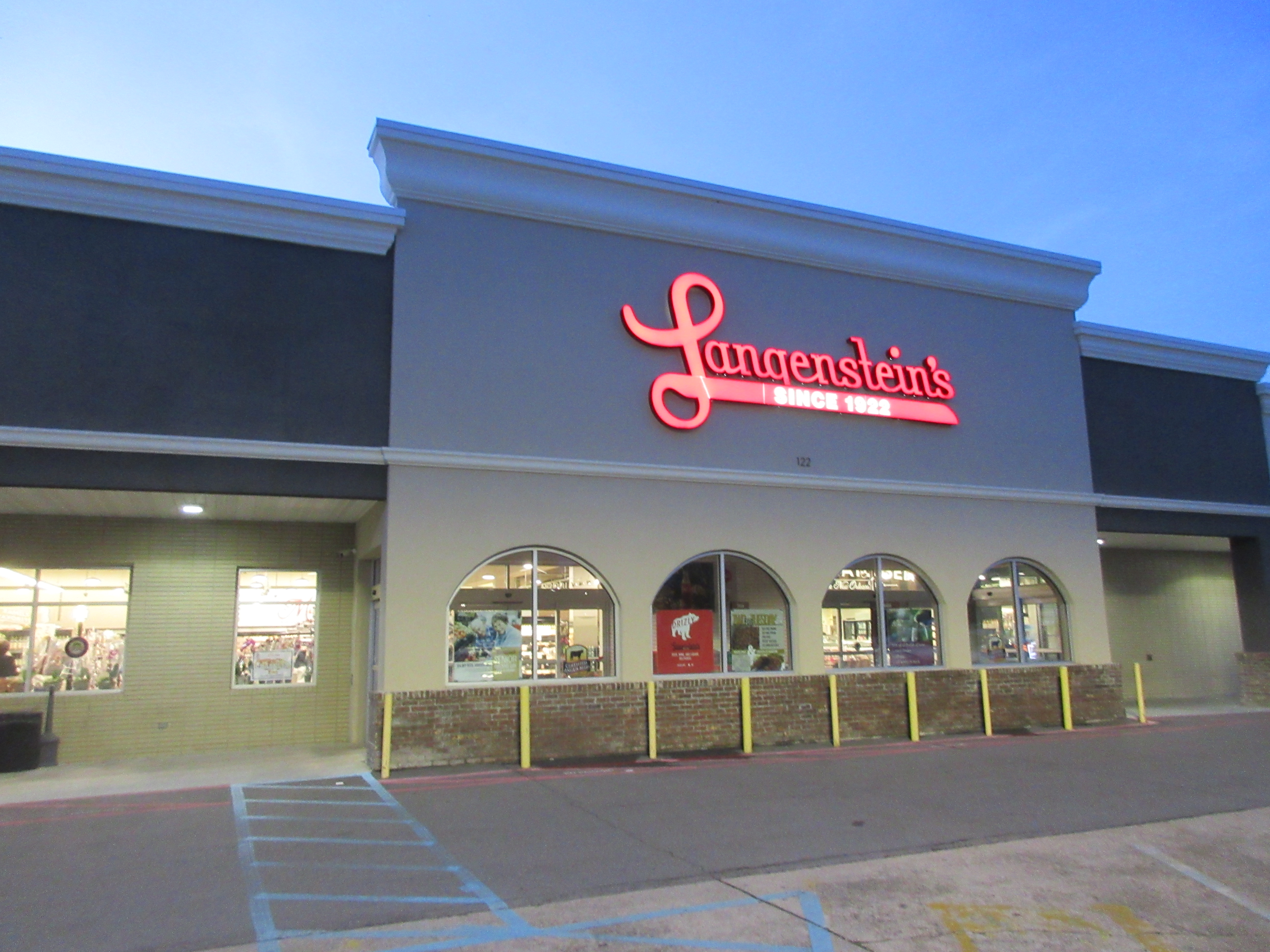
Langenstein's store at River Ridge
