= Yanki Tauber =

Hasidic scholar, writer and editor (born 1965)

Yanki Tauber (born 1965) is a Hasidic scholar, rabbi, writer and editor.

== Biography ==
From 1999 to 2013 Tauber served as chief content editor of Chabad.org. He is currently chief writer and editor of The Book, a new translation and anthologized commentary for The Five Books of Moses. Tauber received his rabbinical ordination from Yeshivat Tomchei Temimim in 1987. He has taught and lectured at the Maayanot Institute of Jewish Studies in Jerusalem, the Eliezer Society at Yale University, and other academic forums. He is the author of three books and more than 800 essays of biblical commentary and Jewish and Hasidic thought. His writings have been translated into Spanish, German, French and other languages.

== Personal life ==
Tauber is married to Riki Tauber and the couple has three daughters—Leah, Chany, and Racheli, who currently studies at the seminary Amudim.
