= Taubman =

Taubman may refer to:

== People ==
- A. Alfred Taubman (1924–2015), American businessman, investor, and philanthropist
- Brandon Taubman (born 1985/1986), baseball executive
- David Taubman, electrical and electronics engineer
- Dorothy Taubman (1917–2013), American music teacher and lecturer
- George Taubman Goldie (1846–1925), Manx co-founder of Nigeria
- Howard Taubman (1907–1996), American music critic, theater critic, and author
- Nicholas F. Taubman (born 1935), American businessman, politician, and diplomat
- Paul Taubman (1939–1995), American economist
- William Chase Taubman (born 1941), American political scientist

== Organizations ==
- Taubman Museum of Art, museum in Roaknoke, Virginia
- Taubmans, Australian paint manufacturer

== See also ==
- Tobman
