= Olga Von Tauber =

Olga Maria Von Tauber
- Born: April 12, 1907; Vienna, Austria
- Died: 2002 (aged 94–95); New York City, USA
- Citizenship: United States
- Education: University of Vienna
- Known for: First women director of NY State Psychiatric Hospital
- Scientific career
- Fields: Psychiatry
- Workplaces: Kings Park State Hospital, Stony Brook University School of Medicine, Nassau University Medical Center

Olga Maria Von Tauber (April 12, 1907 – 2002) was a psychiatrist and philanthropist, who served in the hospitals of Long Island, New York, United States.

== Biography ==
Olga Von Tauber was born to Edward (father) and Anna Fletcher Beck (mother) in Vienna, Austria, on April 12, 1907. She completed her B.S. degree from College of Mariahilf in 1925. On December 14, 1931, she married Robert Frank Von Tauber, Ph.D., who was a chemist and later served as United States’ Consul General of Haiti. During 1931–32, she worked as an intern at the Vienna Clinic for Internal Medicine. Von Tauber received her M.D. from the State University of Vienna in 1932.

Olga Von Tauber came to the United States from Vienna at the age of 38 in 1945, and became a naturalized citizen in 1951. In the US, she started her career as a resident doctor at St. Joseph's Hospital at Bronx, NY, during 1946–47. Later, she obtained board certification in psychiatry from the American Board of Psychiatry and Neurology (ABPN). For a brief period (1944–45), she served as a visiting professor to the University of Haiti at Port-au-Prince, Haiti. Since the 1950s, Dr. Von Tauber had been serving in Kings Park State Hospital in various positions, initially as supervising psychiatrist, then promoted from assistant to associate director in 1967. She became the first woman director in 1968. The authors Kaufman and O'Leary in their study in 1972, while acknowledging Dr. Von Tauber's support, mention her as the director of Northeast Nassau Psychiatric Hospital, Kings Park, New York. In 1968 the Commissioner of Mental Hygiene, Alan D. Miller, MD, who later became the Training Director in the Department of Psychiatry at Stony Brook, appointed her Director of the newly established Northeast Nassau Psychiatric Hospital. The new hospital was located on the grounds of Kings Park, but was separate from it. Dr. Von Tauber retired in 1976 when Northeast Nassau was merged with a similar facility on the grounds of Pilgrim. After retirement, she joined the voluntary faculty of the Department of Psychiatry at Stony Brook while practicing at Nassau University Medical Center. The National faculty directory, in 1986, reported that Von Tauber was a faculty member of the Department of Clinical Psychiatry at SUNY Health Science Center at Stony Brook, New York. Dr. Von Tauber died at the age of 95. The In Memoriam list (published in Psychiatric News, May 2002) by the American Psychiatric Association, reporting the deaths of members between October 1 and February 28, 2002, also included the name Olga M. Von Tauber, M.D.

== Philanthropic contributions ==
Huntington Hospital, which is part of the Northwell Health system, in its 2005 annual report, reported about the donation from the estate of Robert Von Tauber and Olga Von Tauber in 2004. In 2010, Nassau Health Care Foundation (NHCF) reported receiving a bequest of $188,665 from the Von Tauber Revocable Trust, to enhance the department of psychiatry at the Nassau University Medical Center (NUMC). This bequest is an initial partial distribution of the total pledge of approximately $350,000 being made to the NHCF to be used solely and exclusively to improve the department of psychiatry programs. The Department of Psychiatry and Behavioral Science at the Stony Brook University School of Medicine also received a bequest of $254,000 from the Robert and Olga Von Tauber Foundation to enhance education of residents and fellows.

== Recognitions ==
The Digest, a publication of Sinnissippi Centers, Inc., reports Dr. Muhammad Nouman Azhar as a recipient of the Olga Von Tauber Service Award for providing the best services as a resident. In 2011, the Nassau University Medical Center (NUMC) has memorialized Von Tauber by creating the Von Tauber Institute for Global Psychiatry (VTIGP) with Nyapati R. Rao, MD, MS, as the director and Jacob Sperber, MD, as the associate director. On July 29, 2011, NUMC paid further tribute to Von Tauber by announcing that the chairmanship for the department of psychiatry and behavioral sciences at NUMC has been named the Von Tauber Chair of Psychiatry. The Von Tauber Institute for Global Psychiatry has also instituted the Olga Von Tauber Award for scholarly contributions to global mental health, and has presented its first annual award to Margaret Abraham, Ph.D. on April 18, 2012. The institute has recently presented its second annual award to Professor Dinesh Bhugra, in recognition of his outstanding service and accomplishments in world psychiatry.
