= Maria Anna Tauber =

Austrian opera singer

Maria Anna Tauber was an Austrian soprano who is known to have been active between 1777 and 1779; her first name is sometimes given as Marianne, and her last as Taube. A member of the Esterházy opera company, she is believed to have created the role of Markesinn Bellavita in Maximilian Ulbrich's Frühling und Liebe in Vienna on February 8, 1778; she appeared in the playbill as "Mlle Tauber". She was not related to Therese Teyber, who appeared in the same performance. She is likely the "Mlle Teuberin" referred to in a letter of Baron von Gebler.
