= Daub =

Daub or Daube is a surname. It may refer to:

== Daub ==
Daub may refer to:

- Adrian Daub (born 1980), Professor of German
- Ewald Daub (1889–1946), German cinematographer
- Gerti Daub (born 1937), Miss Germany 1957
- Hal Daub (born 1941), American politician and lawyer
- Karl Daub (1765–1836), German Protestant theologian

== Daube ==
Daube may refer to:

- David Daube (1909–1999), professor of law at Oxford and Berkeley
- Dennis Daube, German footballer
- Johann Friedrich Daube (1730–1797), German music theorist
- Peter Daube, New Zealand (voice) actor

== See also ==
- Dauber (disambiguation)
- Taube (surname)
- Taubes (surname)
- Wattle and daub
