= Franz Teyber =

Austrian Kapellmeister, organist and composer

Franz Teyber (bapt. 25 August 1758 in Vienna – 21 October 1810 in Wien-Josefstadt, today 8. Bezirk) was an Austrian Kapellmeister, organist and composer of orchestral and chamber music. Studying under Georg Christoph Wagenseil, from 1786 he was director of the Schikaneder theatre company and from 1801 a composer and musical director of the Theater an der Wien. His sisters Elisabeth and Therese were opera singers, and his brother Anton worked as a composer to (among others) the Dresden opera and Vienna court.

His niece was Elena Teyber who was born in Vienna and became a professor at Iaşi Conservatory where she was known as a pianist and composer from 1827 to 1863. She married Gheorghe Asachi.
