= Taube =

Taube is a surname. Notable people with the surname include:

- Aino Taube (1912–1990), Swedish actress
- Arvid Taube (1853–1916), Swedish politician and noble
- Astri Taube (1898–1980), Swedish sculptor, married to Evert
- Carl Taube (1939–1989), American statistician
- Carlo Taube (1897–1944), Austro-Hungarian pianist, composer, conductor
- Evert Taube (1890–1976), Swedish author, artist, composer and singer, married to Astri
- Hedvig Taube (1714–1744), Swedish noble and salonist, mistress to King Frederick I of Sweden
- Helene Taube (1860–1930), Baltic German noblewoman
- Henry Taube (1915–2005), Canadian-born American chemist, Nobel Prize in Chemistry
- Karl Taube (born 1957), American Mesoamericanist, archaeologist, epigrapher and ethnohistorian
- Mel Taube (1904–1979), American football, basketball, and baseball player and coach
- Mikhail Taube (1869–1961), Russian lawyer, statesman, and historian
- Mortimer Taube (1910–1965), American library scientist
- Nils Taube (1928–2008), Estonian-born British fund manager
- Robert Taube (1880–1961), Russian-born German actor
- Sven-Bertil Taube (1934–2022), Swedish singer and actor
- Taube family, a Baltic Swedish-German noble family

== See also ==
- Taub (surname)
- Daub (surname)
- Taubes (surname)
- Teyber, Austrian family of musicians sometimes spelled this way
