= Dauber =

Dauber may refer to:

== People ==
- Jeremy Dauber, Yiddish literature scholar
- Michele Dauber, American academic
- William Dauber (1935–1980), Chicago mobster

== Other uses ==
- Dauber (horse), an American racehorse, won 1938 Preakness Stakes
- Mud dauber, the common name for several kinds of wasps

== See also ==
- Tauber (surname)
- Daub (disambiguation)
