= Adobo =

Iberian culinary style

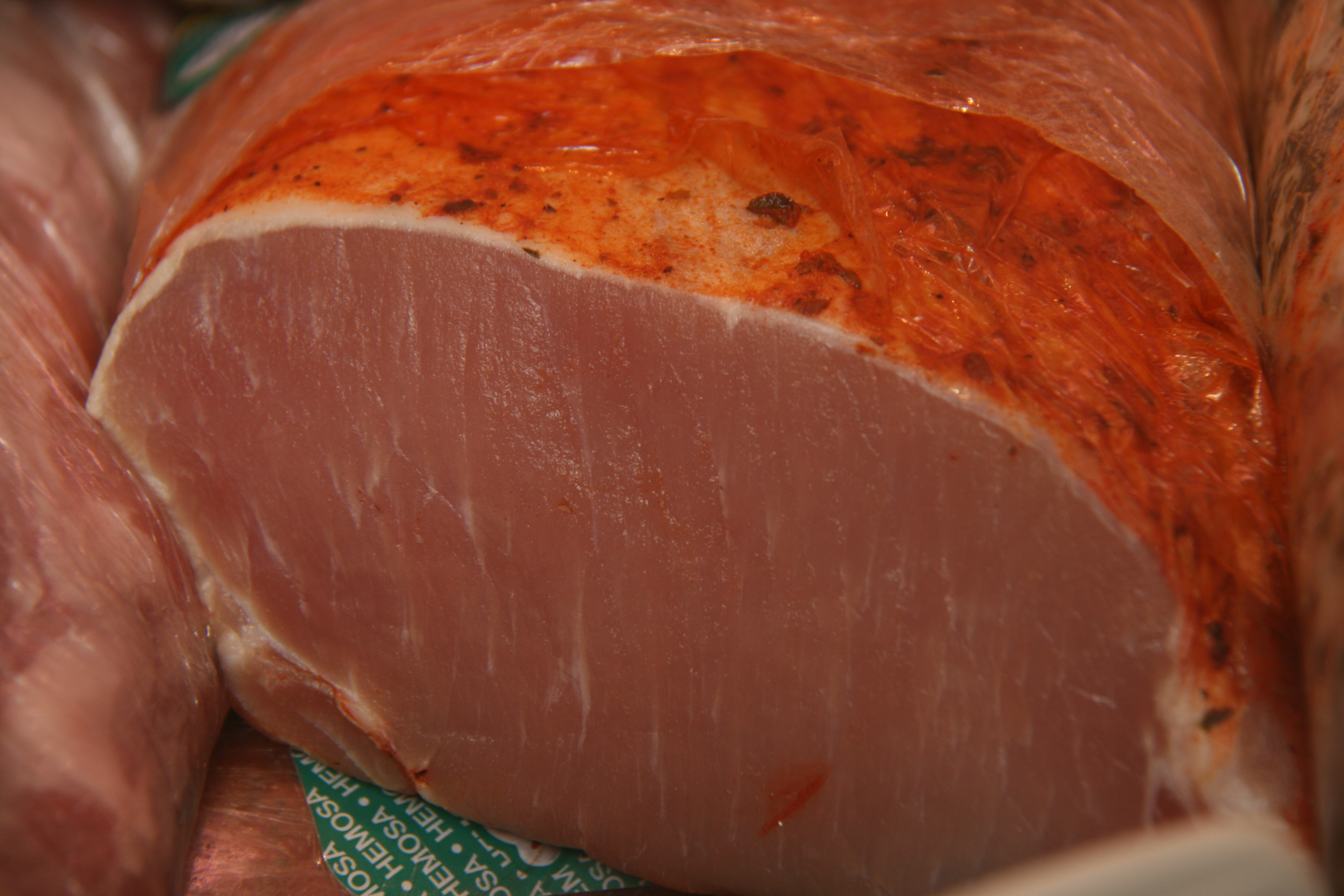
- Lomo en adobo—pork loin marinated in adobo
- Type: Sauce or marinade
- Place of origin: Spain, Portugal
- Main ingredients: Paprika, salt, garlic and vinegar

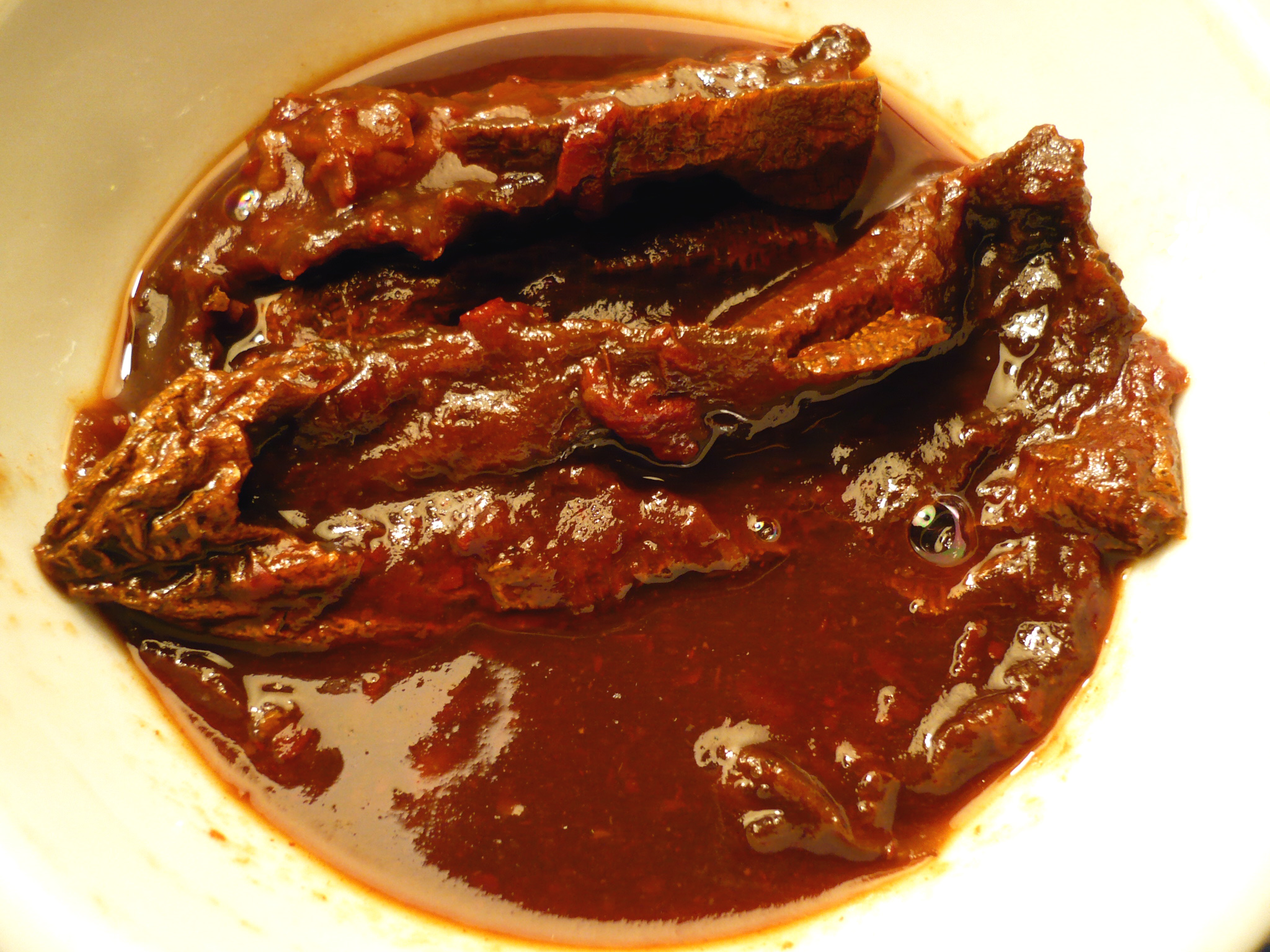
Chipotles en adobo—smoked, ripe jalapeño peppers in adobo

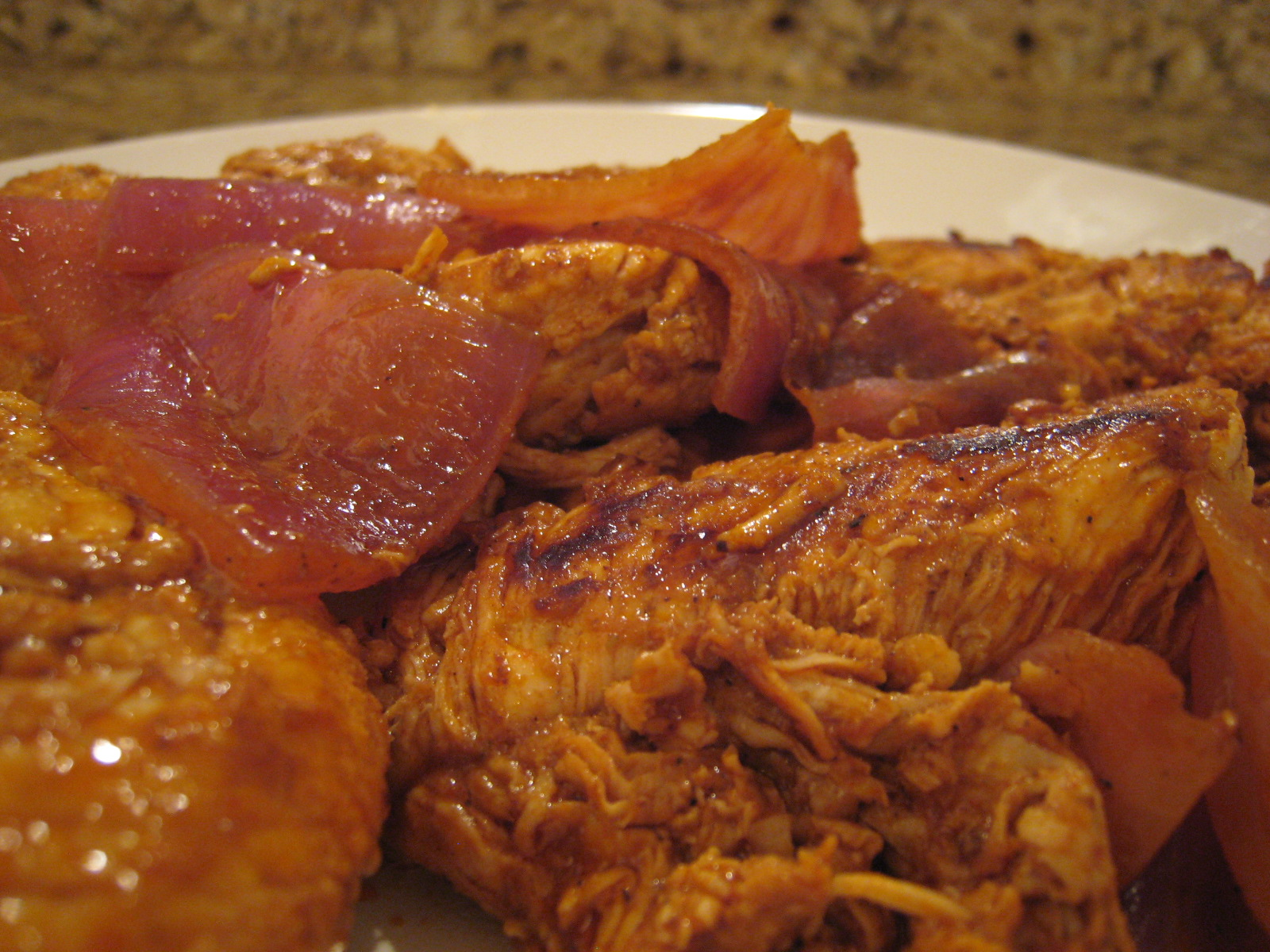
Peruvian adobo chicken made from dried aji panca (yellow lantern chili, Capsicum chinense)

Adobo or adobar (Spanish for 'marinade, sauce or seasoning') is the immersion of food in a stock (or sauce) composed variously of paprika, oregano, salt, garlic, and vinegar to preserve and enhance its flavor. The Portuguese variant is known as carne de vinha d'alhos. The practice, native to Iberia (Spanish and Portuguese cuisine), was widely adopted in Latin America, as well as Spanish and Portuguese colonies in Africa and Asia.

In the Philippines, the name adobo was given by colonial-era Spaniards on the islands to a different indigenous cooking method that also uses vinegar. Although similar, this developed independently of Spanish influence.

== Characteristics ==
In the years following the arrival of Europeans to the Americas, meat and fish began to be preserved by new methods. Low temperatures facilitate food preservation, but in higher temperatures, other techniques, such as adobo, became necessary. Animals were usually slaughtered in the coldest months of winter, but surplus meat had to be preserved in the warmer months. This was facilitated through the use of adobos (marinades) along with paprika (a substance that may have antimicrobial properties due to the capsaicin content). Paprika gives a reddish color to adobos, and the capsaicins in paprika dissolve in fats, allowing its penetration beyond the tissue surface.

== Applications ==
Adobo was employed initially as a method of food preservation, but in time—with the advent of refrigeration methods—it came to be used primarily as a method of flavoring foods before cooking. Traditional preparations were created with the intent of flavoring, such as cazón en adobo (dogfish in adobo, made from school shark and originating from Cádiz in Spain); berenjenas de Almagro (Almagro aubergine, a pickled aubergine characteristic of "Manchega" cuisine from the Castile-La Mancha region of Spain, specifically from Almagro, a city in the Ciudad Real province of Spain); and lomo en adobo (tenderloin of beef or pork in adobo).

== Variations ==
The noun form of adobo describes a marinade or seasoning mix. Recipes vary widely by region: Puerto Rican adobo, a rub used principally on meats, differs greatly from the Mexican variety. Meat marinated or seasoned with an adobo is referred to as adobado or adobada.

=== Mexico ===
In Mexico, adobo refers to a condiment or cooking sauce with a base containing chillies, particularly chipotle and ancho peppers. An ancho pepper is a poblano chili that is dried after it turns red. These sauces are used as a marinade and to add a smoky, spicy flavor.

==== Chipotles en adobo ====
Adobo relates to marinated dishes such as chipotles en adobo in which chipotles (smoked ripe jalapeño peppers) are stewed in a sauce with tomatoes, garlic, vinegar, salt, and spices. The spices vary, but generally include several types of peppers (in addition to the chipotle and most likely those on hand), ground cumin and dried oregano. Some recipes include orange juice and lemon or lime juices. They often include a pinch of brown sugar just to offset any bitter taste.

=== Puerto Rico ===
Puerto Rican–style adobo is a seasoned salt that is generously sprinkled or rubbed on meats and seafood prior to grilling, sautéing, or frying. Supermarkets sell prepared blends. There are two types of adobo on the island. The wet rub, adobo mojado, consists of crushed garlic, olive oil, salt, turmeric, black pepper, false oregano, citrus juice and vinegar. More widely used on the island is a dry mix, adobo seco. It is easier to prepare and has a long shelf life. Adobo seco consists of garlic powder, onion powder, turmeric, salt, black pepper, false oregano and sometimes dried citrus zest, avocado leaf and bay leaf.

=== Peru ===
Adobo is a typical dish of Peruvian cuisine, specifically in the area of Arequipa. This is a dish of pork marinated in spices and vegetables, which are cooked in a clay pot until it becomes tender. Bread is served alongside for dipping in the sauce.

=== Philippines ===
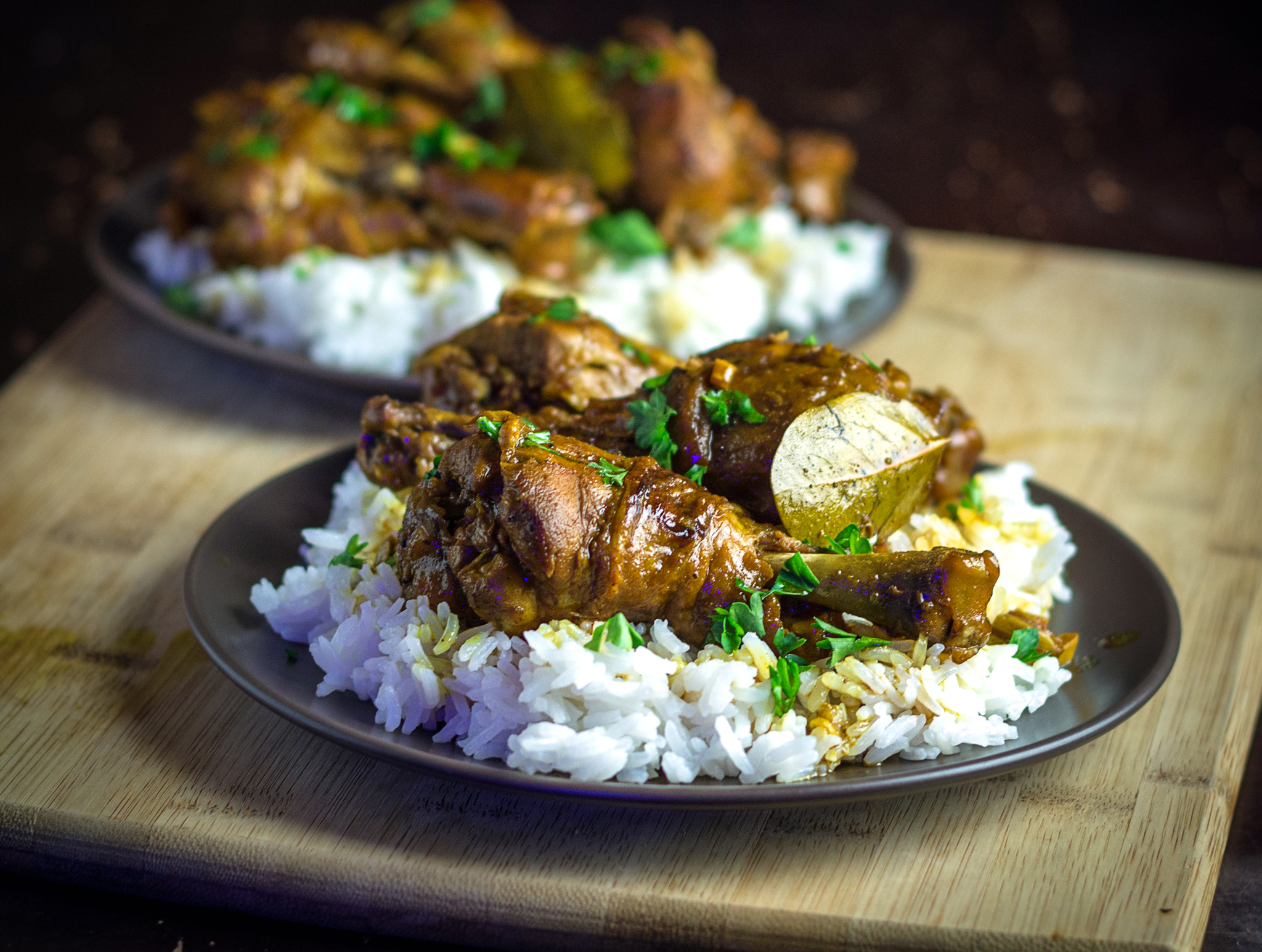
Filipino adobong manok

In Filipino cuisine, adobo refers to a common and indigenous cooking method. In the late 16th century, the Spanish referred to it as adobo due to its superficial similarity.

The main ingredients of Philippine adobo are native to Southeast Asia, namely vinegar, soy sauce or fish sauce, peppercorns, garlic, and bay leaves. It does not traditionally use chilis, paprika, oregano, or tomatoes. Rather, adobo is characteristically salty and sour, and often sweet. Another version is cooking it with coconut milk which turns it into ginataang adobo.

=== Uruguay ===
In Uruguay, adobo is a spice mix of the same spices of the Spanish marinade. Also, adobar is the act of using this mix as a condiment. A sauce made of adobo, salt and water is called mojo.

== History ==
One of the earliest references to adobo is found in the Manual del Cocinero, Repostero, Pastelero, Confitero Y Botillero by Mariano de Rementeria y Fica in 1850.

== See also ==
- Daube – French stew of beef braised in wine and garlic
- Carne de vinha d'alhos – Portuguese dish of meat marinated with garlic and wine
- Torresmos – Portuguese pork dish
