= Elena Asachi =

Romanian pianist, singer and composer

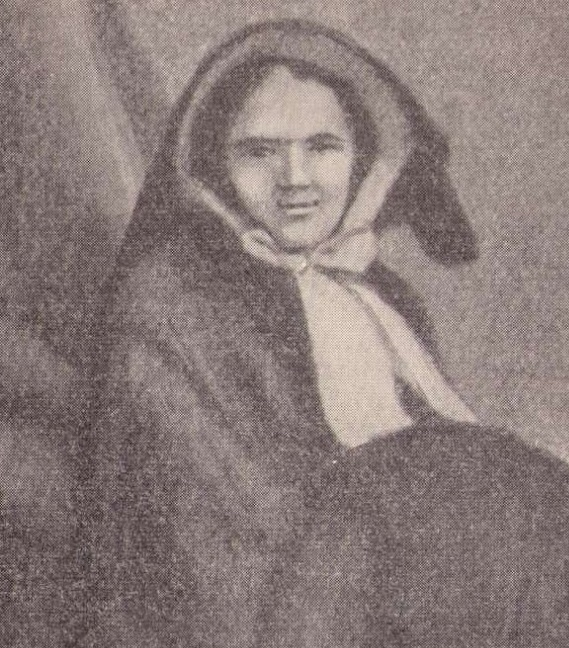
Elena Asachi

Elena Asachi, née Teyber; also known as Hélène and Eleonora (30 October 1789 – 9 May 1877) was a Romanian pianist, singer, translator and composer of Austrian birth. She was the daughter of Austrian composer Anton Teyber and niece of concertmaster Franz Teyber. She studied music under her father as a child in Dresden. Later she studied in Vienna under opera singer Domenico Donzelli. She became a professor at Iași Conservatory where she was known as a pianist and composer from 1827 to 1863. She married Gheorghe Asachi, with whom she collaborated on songs and theatrical works. Together with her husband she promoted the creation of the first music institute in the Principality of Moldavia, the Philharmonic-Drama Conservatory.

== Life ==
Elena Asachi was born Elena Teyber, on 30 October 1789 in Vienna. She was the daughter of Austrian composer Anton Teyber and the niece of concertmaster Franz Teyber. Asachi was a pianist, singer, translator and composer. She studied music under her father as a child in Dresden, including theory, solfege, harmony and counterpoint. Later, around 1882, she studied in Vienna under opera singer Domenico Donzelli. After completing her studies, she became a professor at Iași Conservatory where she was known as a pianist and composer from 1827 to 1863. She married Gheorghe Asachi, with whom she collaborated on songs and theatrical works. Together with her husband she promoted the creation of the first music institute in the Principality of Moldavia - the Philharmonic-Drama Conservatory.

Asachi adapted works by other composers for use in Romanian plays, including works by Vincenzo Bellini, Daniel Auber, Saverio Mercadante, Gaspare Spontini, and Giuseppe Verdi. She also translated scientific and social articles into Romanian, including a children's encyclopedia, translated from French.

Asachi died on 9 May 1877 in Iași.

== Works ==
Selected works include:

- Fête pastorale des bergers moldaves (pastoral-vaudeville) 1834
- Contrabantul (The Smuggler) (comedy-vaudeville) 1837
- Țiganii (The Gypsies) (vaudeville with songs) 1856

Songs:

- Ballade moldave (with G. Asachi) 1834
- Se starb, sagst tu (G. Asachi, translated by E. Asachi) 1837
- Song of Society (with G. Asachi) 1849
