= Patricia Wells =

American food writer

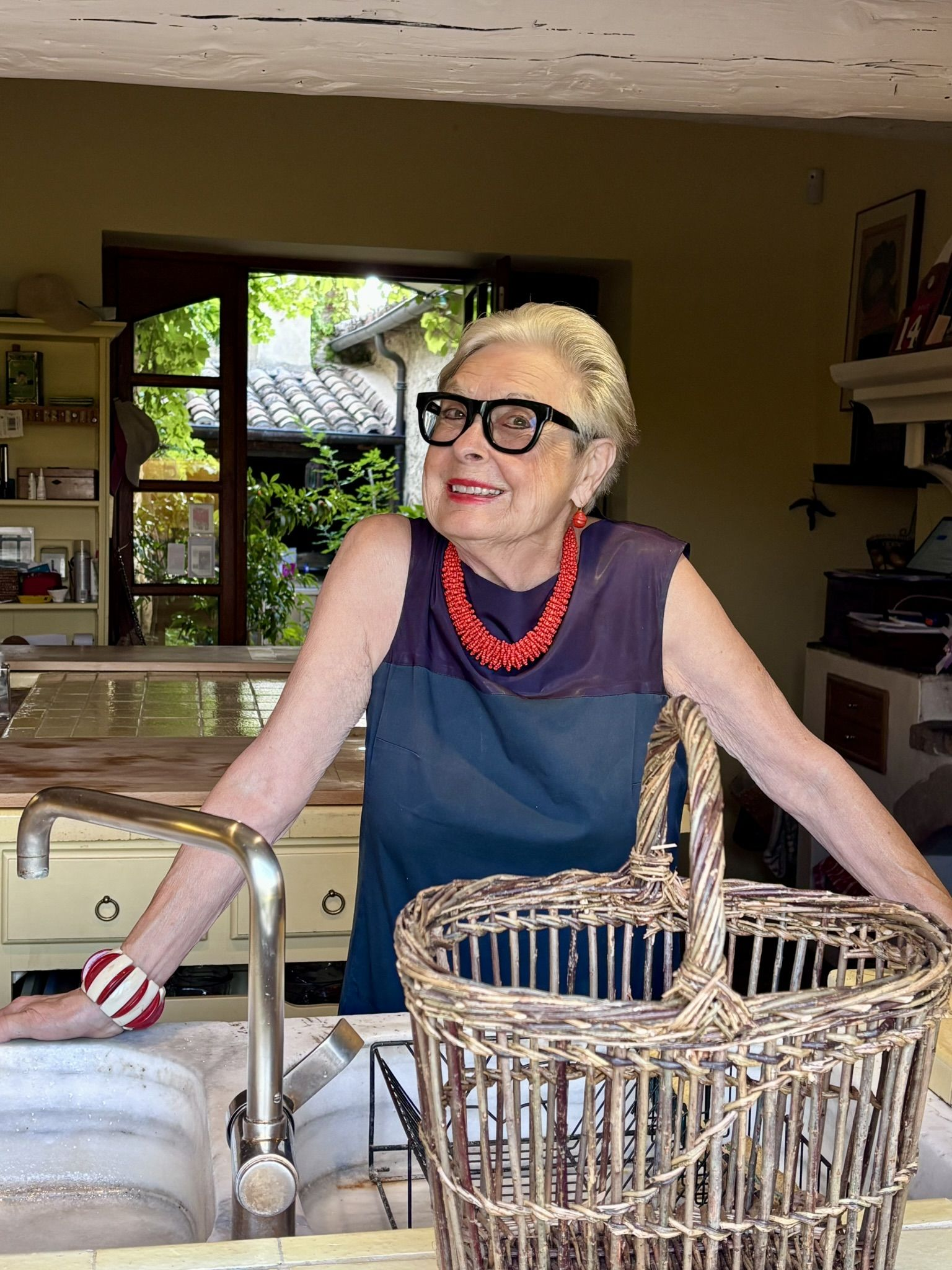
Patricia Wells in 2026

Patricia Wells (born 5 November 1946 in Milwaukee, Wisconsin) is a cookbook author and teacher.

== Biography ==
She divides her time between Paris and Provence. She is the author of numerous food-related books. Her book Patricia Wells at Home in Provence (1996) won the James Beard Award for Best International Cookbook. Wells is the only American and the only woman to be a restaurant critic for a major French publication, L'Express (1988–1991).

She was the restaurant critic for the International Herald Tribune from 1980 until 2007.

== Books ==
- The Food Lover's Guide to Paris (1984)
- The Food Lover's Guide to France (1987)
- Bistro Cooking (1989)
- Simply French (1991)
- Patricia Wells' Trattoria (1993)
- Patricia Wells at Home in Provence (1996)
- L'Atélier of Joel Robuchon (1998)
- The Paris Cookbook (2001)
- The Provence Cookbook (2004)
- Vegetable Harvest (2007)
- We've Always Had Paris ... And Provence (2008) with Walter Wells
- Salad as a Meal (2011)
