= Daube =

French stew of beef braised in wine and garlic

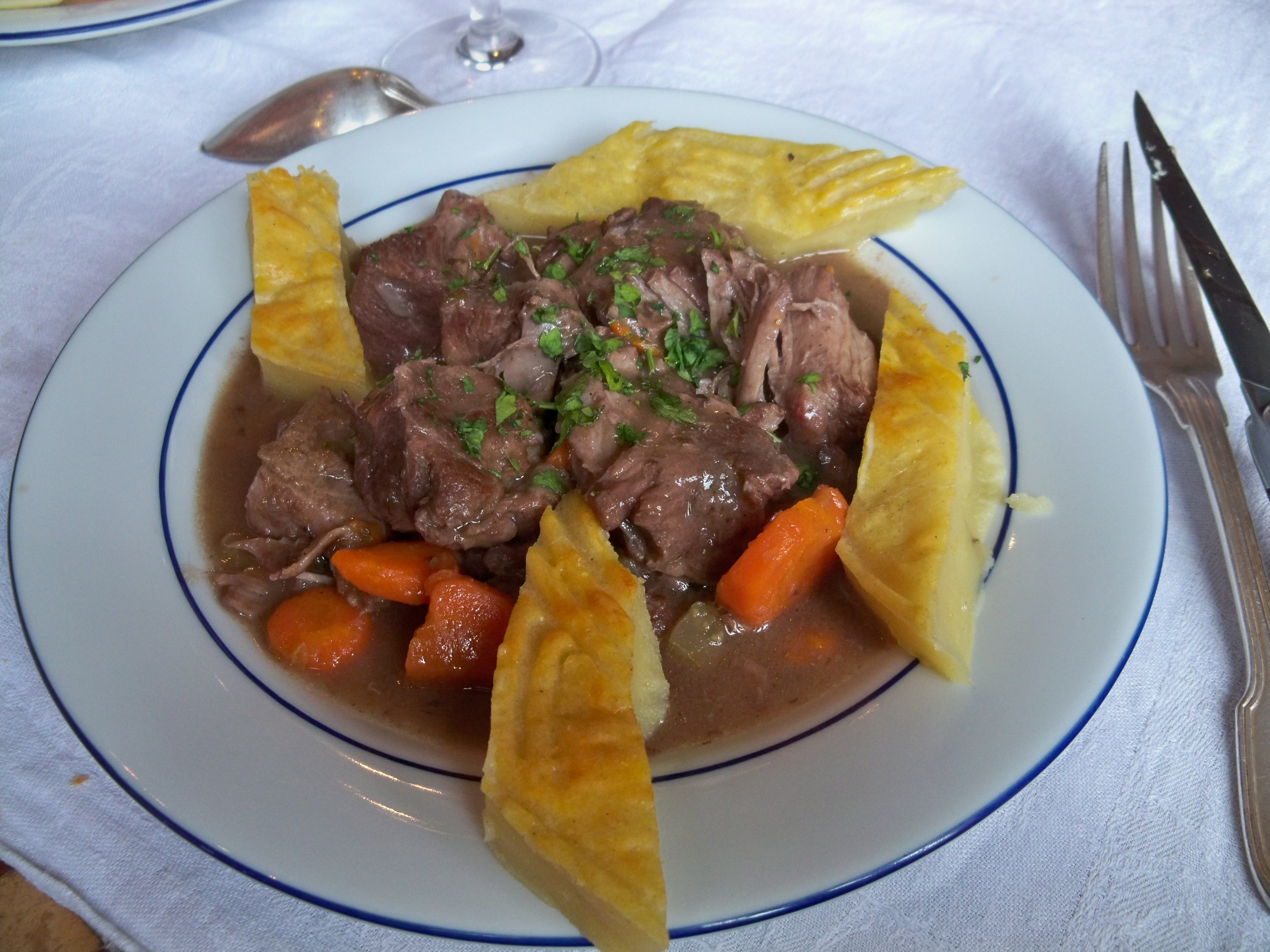
- Type: Stew
- Place of origin: France
- Region or state: Provence
- Main ingredients: Beef, wine, vegetables

Daube (French pronunciation: [dob], Occitan: adòba or adobo) is a French slow-cooked stew, usually of beef, but other meat is sometimes used. The best-known is the bœuf en daube à la provençale, a Provençal stew made with cheaper cuts of beef braised in wine, with vegetables, garlic and herbs, and traditionally cooked in a daubière–a braising pot.

== Terminology and history ==
The Oxford English Dictionary defines a daube as "A braised meat (usually beef) stew with wine, spices, etc". In The Oxford Companion to Food, Philip and Mary Hyman note that the word is a French culinary term indicating both a method of cooking and a type of dish. The Dictionnaire de l'Académie française dates the word to the 16th century, and says that it derives from the Occitan dobba, a marinade.

In the 18th century, daubes were a specialty of the French town of Saint-Malo. The Hymans comment that there were many different types: "artichokes en daube, celery, pork cutlets, goose— all these and many other foodstuffs besides were prepared en daube". Most were made to be eaten cold. Daubes remained popular in 19th-century France, but by then, they were nearly always meat dishes, usually beef, eaten hot. By the end of the 20th century, the term was largely confined to bœuf en daube. The dish came to be seen as rustic and old-fashioned, and the copper pots—daubières—in which it was traditionally cooked became "a curiosity in antique markets".

== Description ==
=== Meat ===
Cooks differ widely regarding which meat should be used for a daube. There is common consent that it should have a long marinade before cooking, but some say it should be cooked as a whole piece, others that it should be cubed or sliced. In their Mastering the Art of French Cooking, Simone Beck and Julia Child describe bœuf en daube à la provençale as a braised pot roast of beef with wine, tomatoes, and provençal flavourings:

This is a large, whole piece of braising beef larded with strips of ham, marinated in red wine and herbs, and slowly simmered in a lightly thickened mixture of the marinade liquid, beef stock, and tomatoes, which turns into a rich ready-made sauce at the end of the cooking.

Their insistence that the dish contains a whole piece of beef is not shared by some other cooks. Elizabeth David writes in French Provincial Cooking:

There must be scores of different recipes for daubes in Provence alone, as well as all those which have been borrowed from Provence by other regions, for a daube of beef is essentially a country housewife's dish. In some daubes the meat is cut up, in others it is cooked in the piece; what goes in apart from the meat is largely a matter of what is available, and the way it is served is again a question of local taste.

The recommended cuts of meat for a daube vary. David favours top rump (also called thick flank); Beck and Child's preference is for topside; Auguste Escoffier, referring to French butchers' cuts, specifies paleron or gîte; Prosper Montagné favours the more expensive rump; Paula Wolfert opts for short rib; Joël Robuchon recommends ox cheeks (and notes that in Provence a daube is sometimes made with beef from the Camargue bull or with lamb shoulder); and Patricia Wells advises using at least three cuts of beef from different parts of the animal, arguing that some – such as plats de cétes – enhance flavour with their cartilaginous bones, others – such as tende de tranche – provide purer meat with little muscle separation, and others – such as paleron add both meat and muscle for added texture. (Note: The three French cuts approximate to short ribs, topside and chuck.)

=== Cooking pot ===
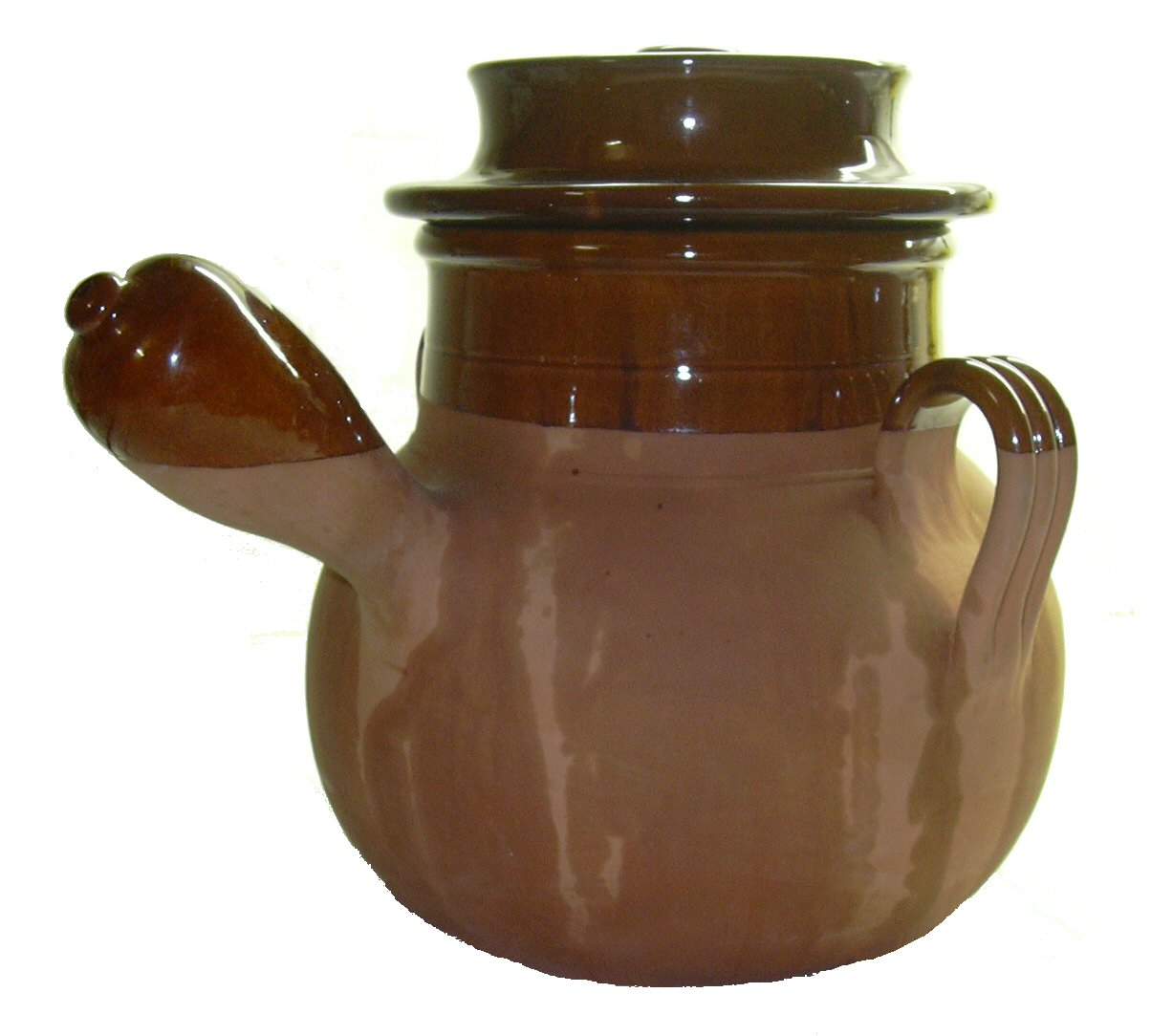
A daubière

There is, similarly, no unanimity about what a daube is cooked in. In Larousse Gastronomique Prosper Montagné specifies a daubière, a traditional cooking pot, which may be made of stoneware, earthenware or tinned copper. Wells and Wolfert opt for earthenware. In her 2009 book Mediterranean Clay Pot Cooking Wolfert calls the daubière "instantly recognizable by its tall, potbellied shape and distinctive lid … designed so that the ingredients can be packed inside with only a small amount of liquid and then set over low heat to braise". Daubières slowly convey heat up from the bottom, causing the tough connective tissues in the meat to transform into gelatine. According to Robuchon a daubière or other clay casserole is ideal, but he suggests as alternatives a cast-iron casserole or other heavy pan.

David writes that the cooking pot may be earthenware, cast iron, copper or aluminium, "wide rather than deep"; Beck and Child call for a heavy, covered casserole, without specifying what it is made of.

=== Wine and other ingredients ===
The wine in a daube is usually red, but for the bœuf en daube à la provençale Montagné and Wolfert specify white. David, Escoffier, Robuchon and Wells use red, as do Beck and Child, who recommend a complete bottle of strong young red such as Mâcon or Beaujolais. Tomatoes, onions, herbs, garlic, salt and pepper are common to most daubes. Some cooks add other ingredients, which may include anchovies, carrots, cloves, marrow bones, mushrooms, nutmeg, olives, pancetta, orange peel, pork rind, salt pork, tomato purée, and wine vinegar. Some recipes include a small amount of flour to thicken the braising liquid.

== Other daubes ==
Other beef daubes include:

- À l'albigeoise – a pig's trotter and a calf's foot are added to the cooking liquid along with diced beef.
- À l'ancienne – a whole piece of rump, marinated and cooked in white wine and brandy.
- À la béarnaise – diced rump, marinated in red wine and brandy and cooked in the marinade with added beef stock.
- À la corsoise – a whole piece of rolled rib of beef, slowly cooked without wine (fresh tomatoes add sufficient liquid); new potatoes cooked in oil or butter are added along with mushrooms as the dish nears the end of its cooking time.
- À la créole – a New Orleans and Louisiana Creole recipe, in which rum takes the place of wine in the cooking liquid. David comments that few people would detect the difference in the alcoholic ingredient or could say in what precise way the stew differs from the French original.
- À la languedocienne – to the usual beef, red wine, onions and tomatoes are added leeks, smoked pork sausage and haricot beans.
- À la niçoise – raw ham, celery and lemon peel are added to slices of beef in the marinade and cooking liquid.

Montagné mentions daubes of chicken, turkey and pheasant, and David prints a recipe for daube à la avignonnaise, in which mutton or lamb is used, rather than beef. Tomatoes are not used, but otherwise the ingredients are the same as for a typical bœuf en daube à la provençale.

Bœuf en daube à la provençale

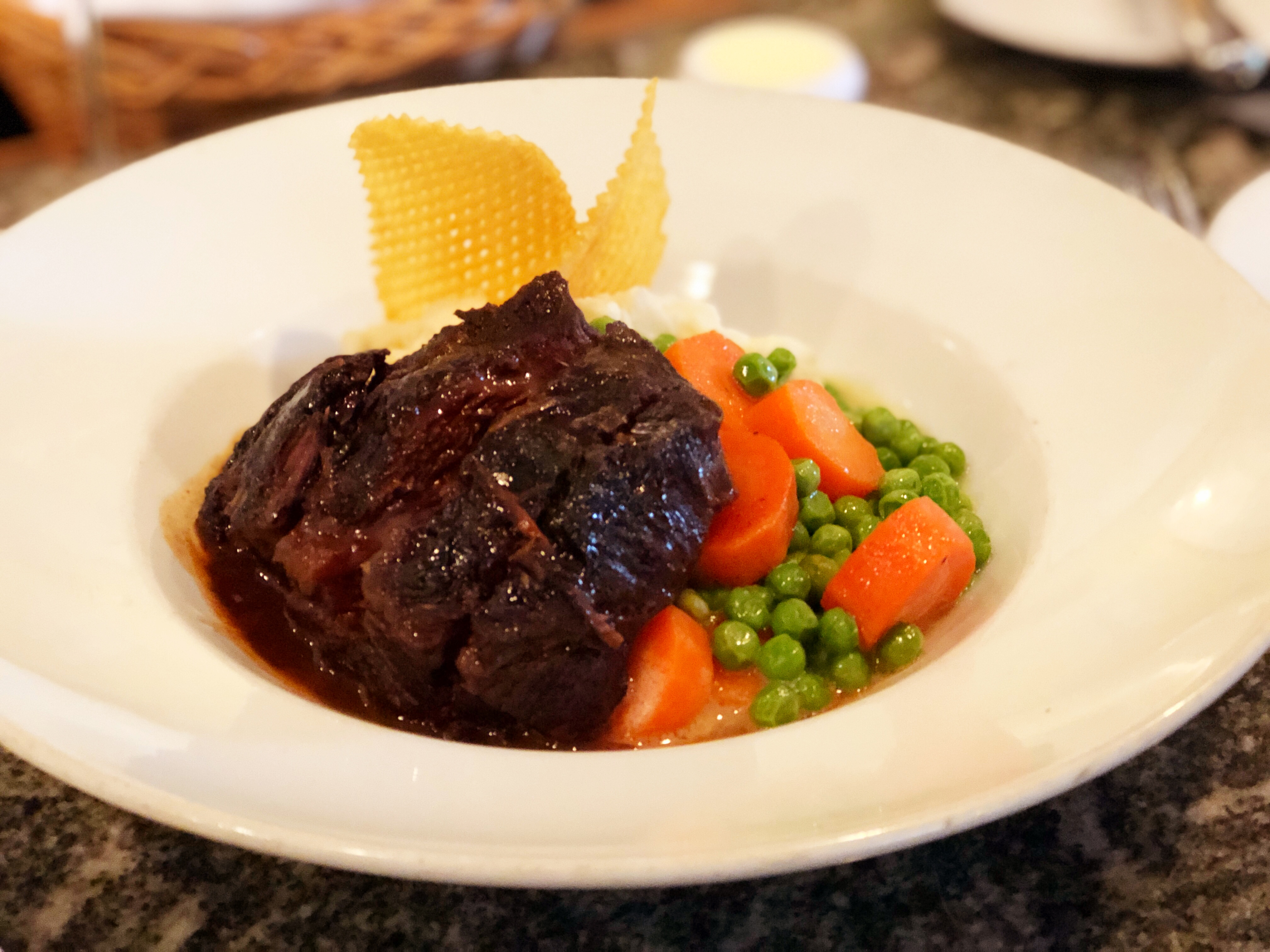
With buttered carrots and peas

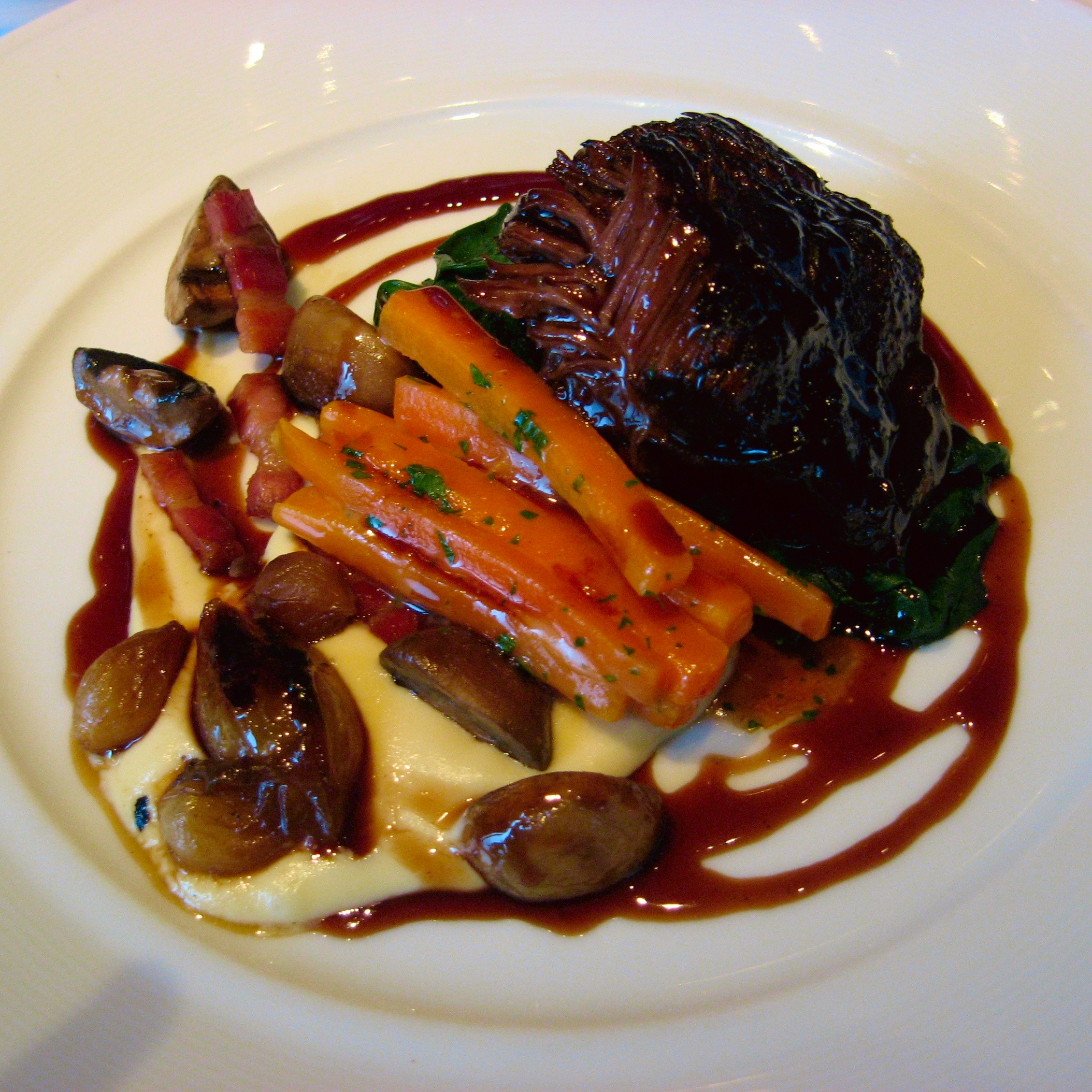
With lardons, carrots, and button mushrooms, served on parsnip purée

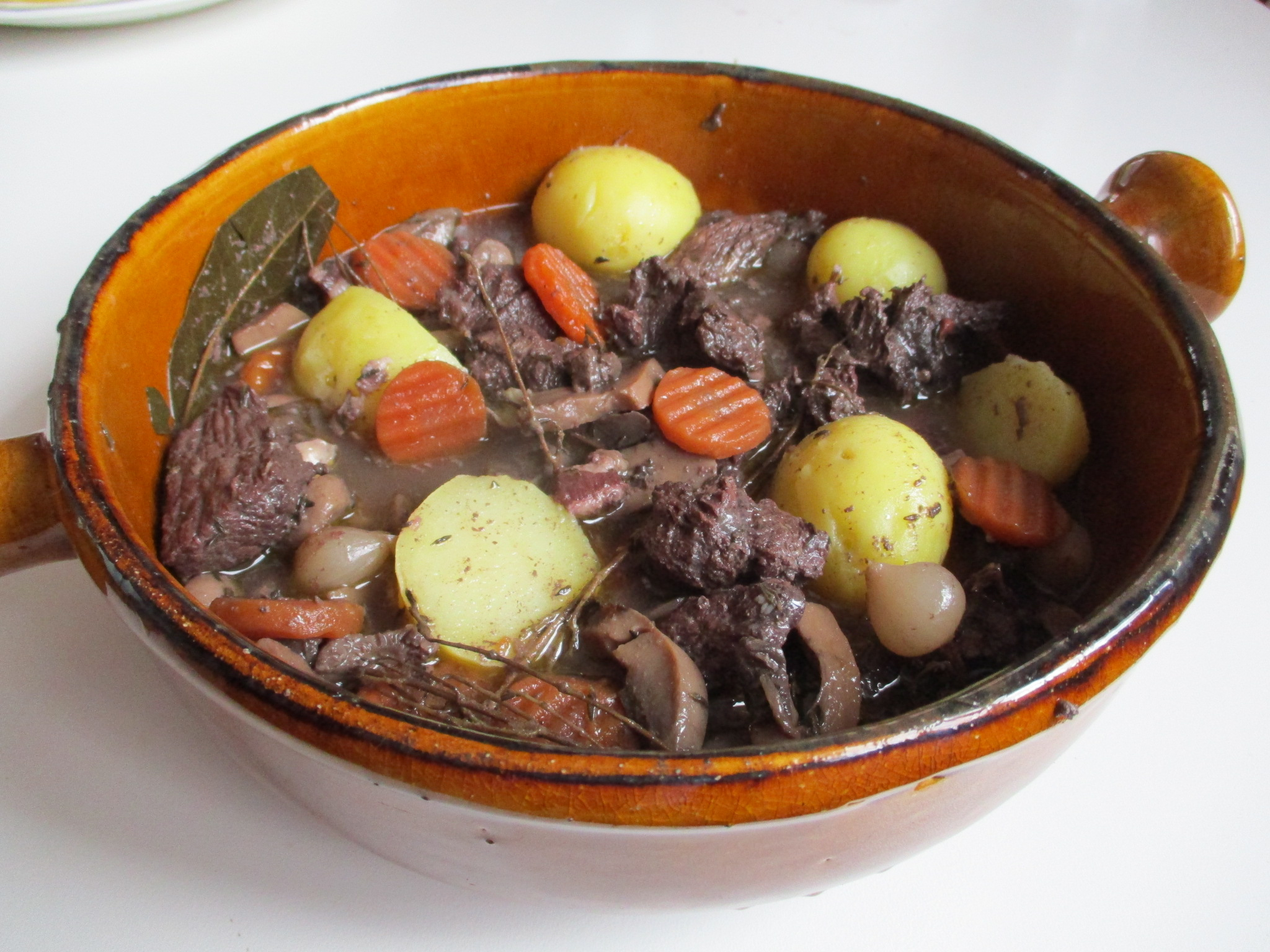
With potatoes and carrots

== Notes, references and sources ==
=== Sources ===
- Beck, Simone; Julia Child (1978) [1970]. Mastering the Art of French Cooking, Volume Two. London: Penguin. ISBN 978-0-14-046221-0.
- David, Elizabeth (1999) [1980]. Elizabeth David Classics. London: Grub Street. ISBN 978-1-902304-27-4.
- David, Elizabeth (2008) [1960]. French Provincial Cooking. London: Folio Society. OCLC 809349711.
- Escoffier, Auguste (1934). Ma Cuisine. Paris: Flamarion. OCLC 981486233.
- Floyd, Keith (1987). Floyd on France. London: BBC. ISBN 978-0-56-320519-7.
- Hyman, Philip; Mary Hyman (1999). "Daube". In Alan Davidson (ed.). The Oxford Companion to Food. Oxford: Oxford University Press. ISBN 978-0-19-211579-9.
- Montagné, Prosper (1976). Larousse Gastronomique. London: Hamlyn. OCLC 1285641881.
- Wells, Patricia (1997). Patricia Wells at Home in Provence. London: Kyle Cathie. ISBN 978-1-85-626192-0.
- Wolfert, Paula (2009). Mediterranean Clay Pot Cooking. Hoboken: John Wiley. ISBN 978-0-76-457633-1.

== See also ==
- Adobo – Iberian culinary style
- Boeuf bourgignon – French beef dish
- Carne de vinha d'alhos – Portuguese dish of meat marinated with garlic and wine
- Pot-au-feu – French beef stew
- List of stews
