= Anton Teyber =

Austrian musician

Anton Teyber (8 September 1756 (bapt.) – 18 November 1822) was an Austrian organist, Kapellmeister and composer.

Anton Teyber was born and died in Vienna. His brother was Franz Teyber. He taught the children of the Holy Roman Emperor before working as a composer to (among others) the Dresden opera and Vienna court. He is notable for his two 'Concertos for Corni da Caccia'. He also performed alongside Mozart and Nikolaus Kraft in 1789 during Mozart's Berlin journey.

His daughter was Elena Teyber who was born in Vienna and became a professor at Iaşi Conservatory where she was known as a pianist and composer from 1827 to 1863. She married Gheorghe Asachi.

== Works ==
- 11 Masses
- Requiem in E flat ("Pro defuncta Imperatrice Ludovica")
- Gioas re di Giuda Oratorio (Libretto by Pietro Metastasio; Premiered at Burgtheater, Vienna, 1786)
- Other sacred works
- 36 symphonies
- 6 violin concertos
- A double concerto for violin and piano in C
- 4 piano concertos
- 2 horn concertos
- 29 string quartets
- 14 piano quartets
- 2 sextets
- 3 octets (Strings, 2 oboes, 2 horns)
- 3 piano trios
- 6 string trios
- Other chamber works, minuets, gavottes etc. for piano
