= Taubes =

Taubes is a surname. Notable people with the surname include:

- Aaron Moses Taubes (1787–1852), Romanian rabbi and writer
- Clifford Taubes (born 1954), American mathematician
  - Taubes's Gromov invariant, mathematical concept named after Clifford
- Gary Taubes (born 1956), science journalist, author of Good Calories, Bad Calories
- Jacob Taubes (1923–1987), religion sociologist, philosopher and studied Judaism
- Susan Taubes (1928–1969), writer and religion sociologist, wife of Jacob

== See also ==
- Daub (surname)
- Taube (surname)
- Taube family
