= Chamorro red rice =

Chamorro rice dish colored with annatto

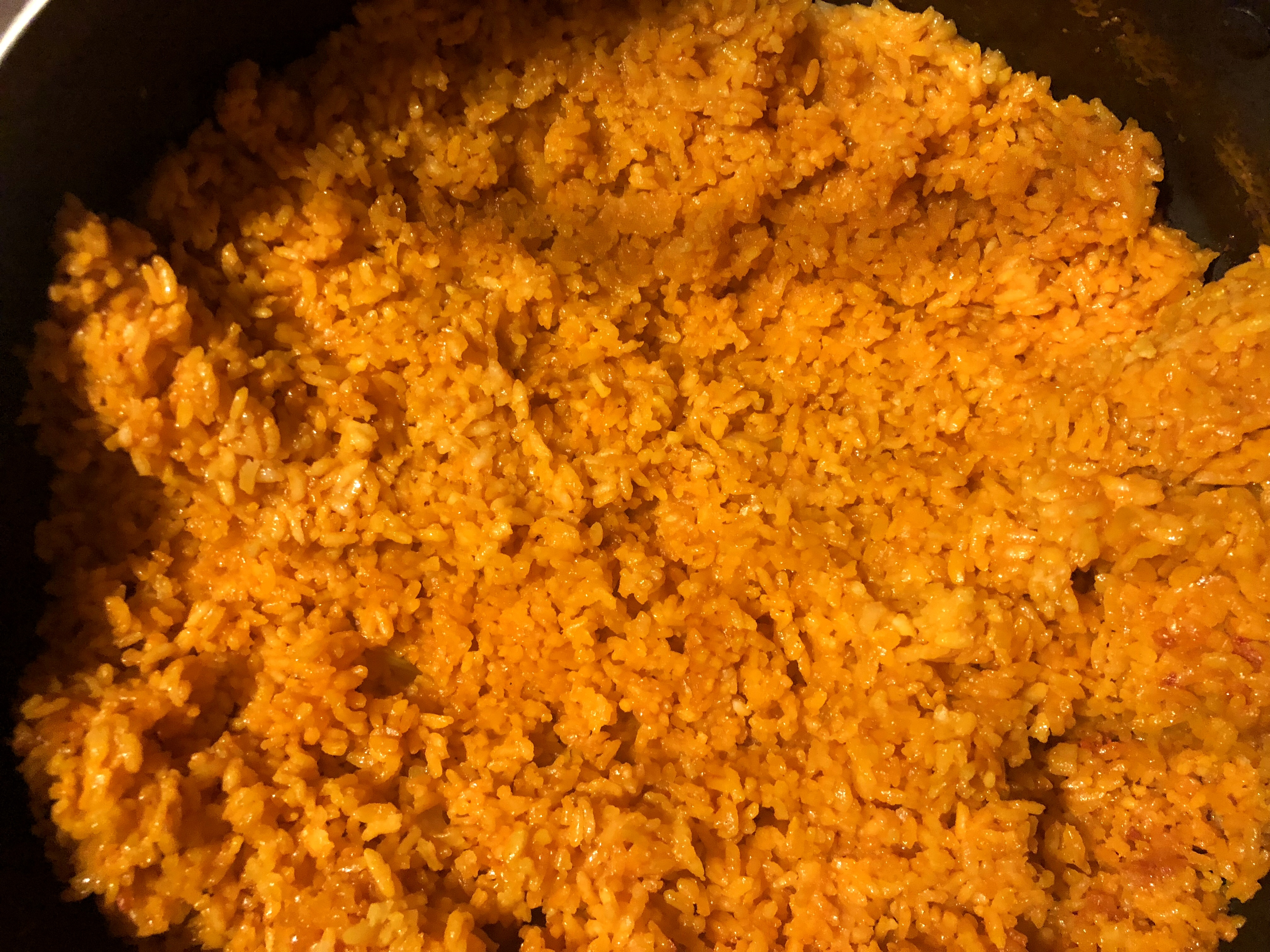
- Alternative names: Hineksa' aga'ga', Eneksa agaga, Saipan red rice
- Type: Rice dish
- Place of origin: Guam
- Region or state: Mariana Islands
- Associated cuisine: Chamorro cuisine
- Serving temperature: Warm
- Main ingredients: Rice, achote or annatto

Chamorro red rice, also known in Chamorro as hineksa' aga'ga' or eneksa agaga, is a rice dish in Chamorro cuisine associated with Guam and the Mariana Islands. It is prepared by cooking rice with water colored and flavored with achote or annatto, which gives the dish its orange-red color. It also provides a slightly nutty flavor.

The dish is widely associated with Chamorro fiestas, parties, and large gatherings.

== Name ==
The Chamorro name hineksa' aga'ga' may be translated as "red rice". The color comes from achote, also spelled achiote, the seed of the annatto tree. Achote was introduced to the Marianas during the Spanish period and likely came from Mexico.

== Preparation ==
Traditional preparation involves soaking achote seeds in water to produce a reddish liquid, sometimes called achote water, which is then used to cook the rice. Modern recipes may use achote powder instead of whole seeds. Other ingredients vary by household and may include onion, garlic, bacon, peas, oil, chicken stock, or seasoning.

The rice may be prepared either on a stovetop or in a rice cooker. Recipes differ in the type of rice used, with short-, medium-, and long-grain rice.

It can also be made to be spicy.

== Cultural significance ==
Rice has long been important in Guam’s food culture, although most rice consumed in Guam and the Northern Mariana Islands is now imported. Red rice is especially associated with communal meals and celebrations. It is commonly served with meat dishes such as barbecue, fried chicken, or Spam.

A nutritional study of a fiesta in Sinajana classified red rice as an aggon or starchy food and described it as white rice cooked in annatto-colored water. In that study, red rice was the largest prepared dish by weight and contributed the greatest share of total food energy among the dishes served.

== Nutrition ==
Chamorro red rice is high in carbohydrates, but low in fiber.

== Variation ==
One variation is Balensiåna rice or hineksa' Balensiåna referring to Valencia, Spain. However, sometimes it is used interchangeably with red rice. One possible distinction is that hineksa' Balensiåna uses large pieces of meat and vegetables whereas hineksa' agaga' uses small amounts of onions and possibly bacon.

== See also ==
- Chamorro cuisine
- Cuisine of the Mariana Islands
- Annatto
- Kelaguen
- Fina'denne'
