= Roskette =

Chamorro cornstarch cookies

Rosketti
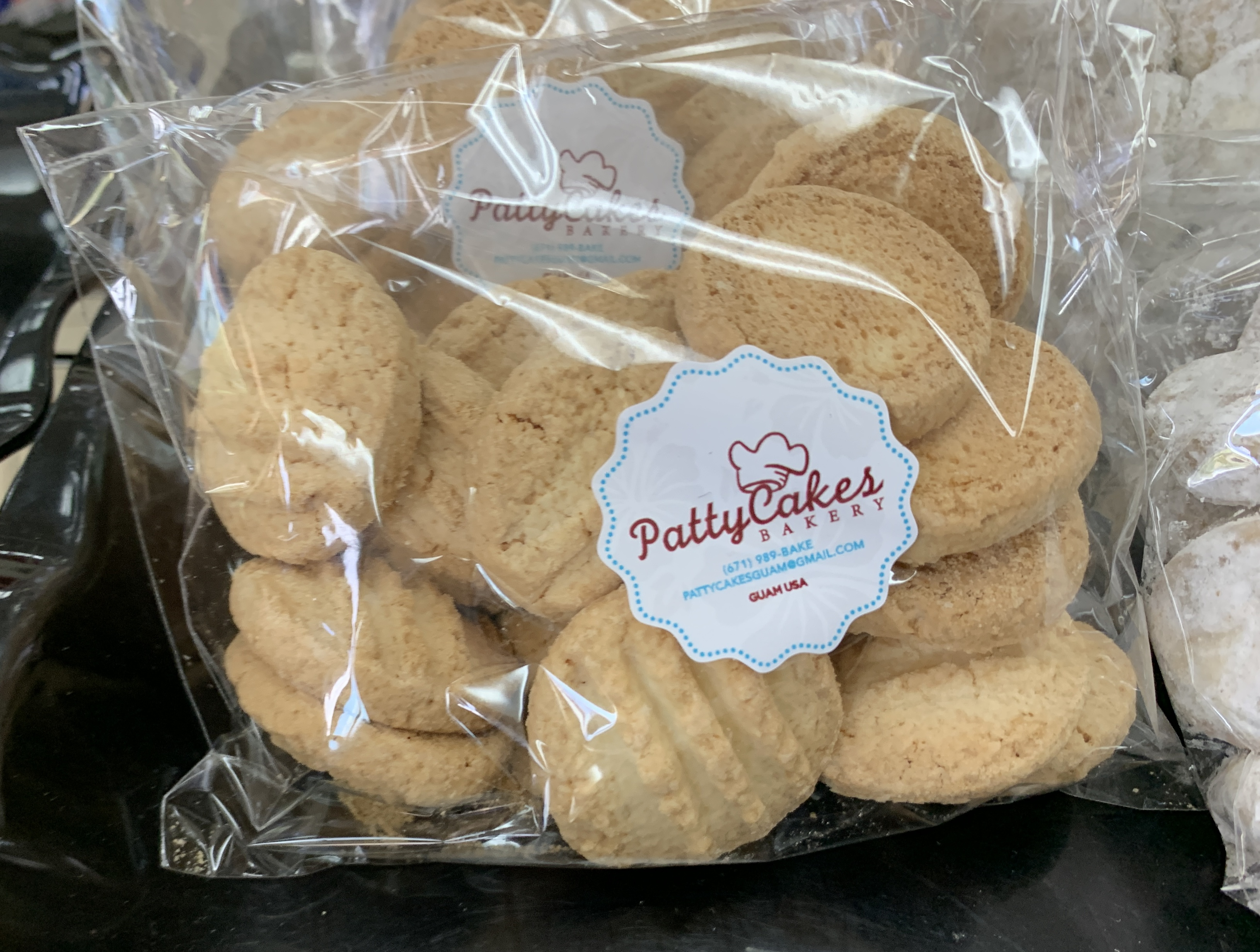
- Alternative names: Rosketi
- Type: Cookie
- Place of origin: Mariana Islands
- Main ingredients: Corn starch, flour, sugar, butter or shortening, milk or cream, eggs, baking powder, vanilla

Rosketti or rosketi are traditional Chamorro cornstarch cookies.

== Ingredients ==
The primary ingredient for rosketti is typically corn starch. Other ingredients include flour, sugar, butter or shortening, milk or cream, eggs, baking powder, and vanilla. Some rosketti recipes result in a very thick, hard-to-swallow cookie, while others yield a crumbly, melt-in-your-mouth result. The taste and texture of a rosketti recipe, however, produces a very distinct end result, due primarily to the use of cornstarch.

== Making ==
Rosketti dough is historically rolled into a log the size and length of a pencil. The dough is either formed into a coil, or into a pretzel. Some shape the dough into a ball then flatten the dough with the tines of a fork. The cookies are baked on a greased cookie sheet till moderately or lightly browned.

== See also ==
- Cuisine of the Mariana Islands

== Sources ==
- Idehan Krismas. Department of Education, Guam. 1981.
- Lepblon Fina'tinas Para Guam. Inetnon Famalaon. 1977. (Guam cookbook)
- Lepblon Fina'tinas Para Guam. Inetnon Famalaon. 1988. (Guam cookbook)
- A Taste of Guam. Quinene, P. 2006.
