= Latiya (dessert) =

Chamorro cake

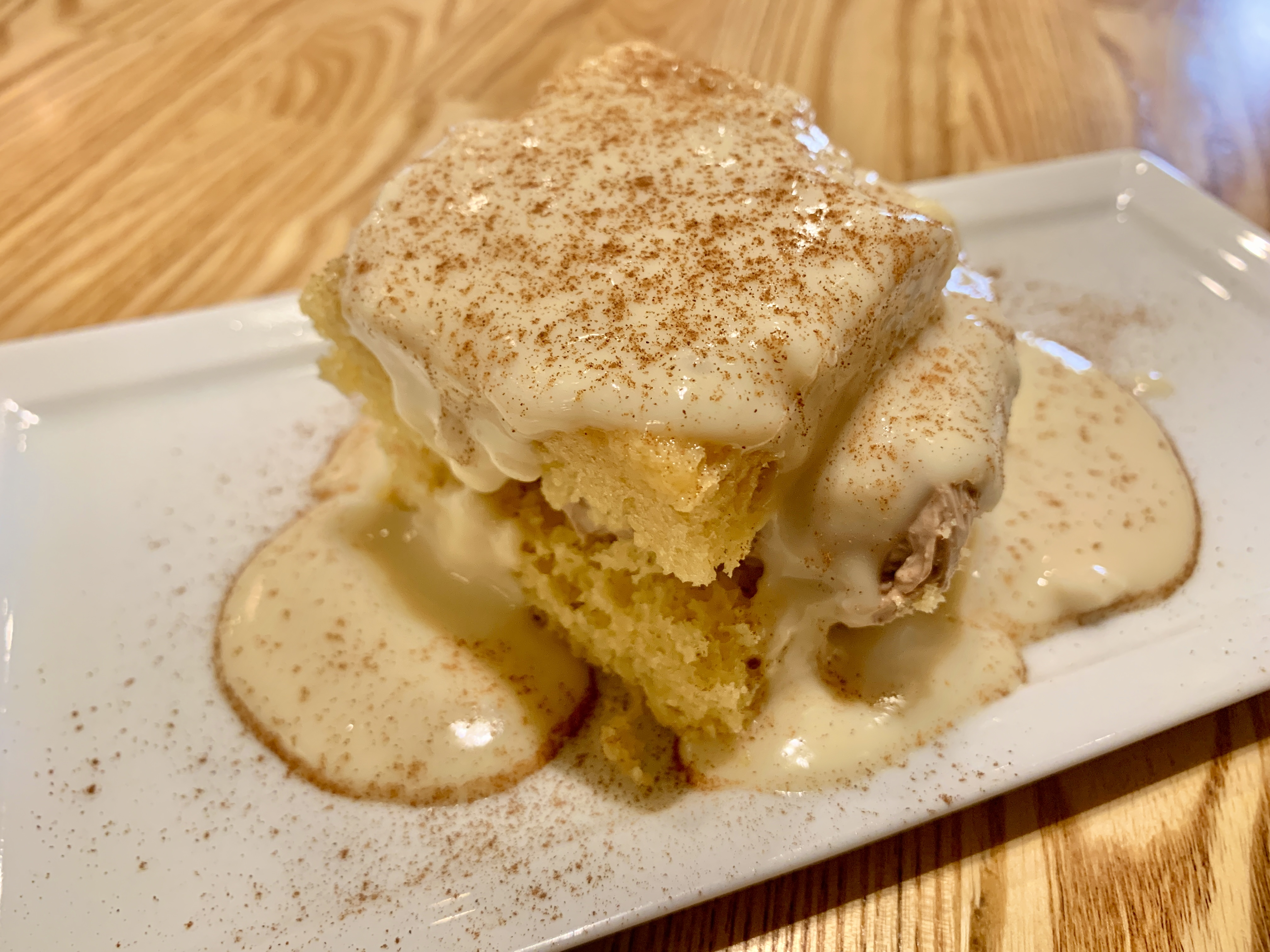
- Latiya
- Alternative names: Lantiya, natiya
- Type: Cake
- Course: Dessert
- Place of origin: United States
- Region or state: Guam & CNMI
- Main ingredients: sponge cake, vanilla custard, and cinnamon

Latiya (Lantiyas in CNMI dialect) is a Chamorro dessert from Guam made from sponge cake, vanilla custard, and cinnamon. In Saipan and the other Mariana Islands, it is called lantiya. First, the sponge cake is baked, sliced, and then covered with a custard. The sponge cake can be one of any variety, such as pound cake, carrot cake, or Chamorro cake. The custard may or may not contain eggs, and can also be poured in between the layers of cake. At the end, the cake is topped with cinnamon.

It is believed that the cake was introduced by the Spanish from the 17th to 19th centuries, and comes from Spanish natillas. Natillas are a traditional Spanish dessert custard served with sponge finger cakes. The Chamorro people would often change the letter N to L in Spanish words, so it is known as both latiya and natiya.

The traditional Chamorro diet did not originally include milk, sugar, or cinnamon, so is thought to have introduced by the Spanish who also brought the practice of thickening sauces with starch and baking cakes. It is also possible that the dish became more popular after World War II, when the ingredients were more available to the general public.

These days, the dessert is commonly made and served at parties and other celebrations.

== See also ==
- Cuisine of the Mariana Islands
