= Chalakiles =

Type of Chamorro soup

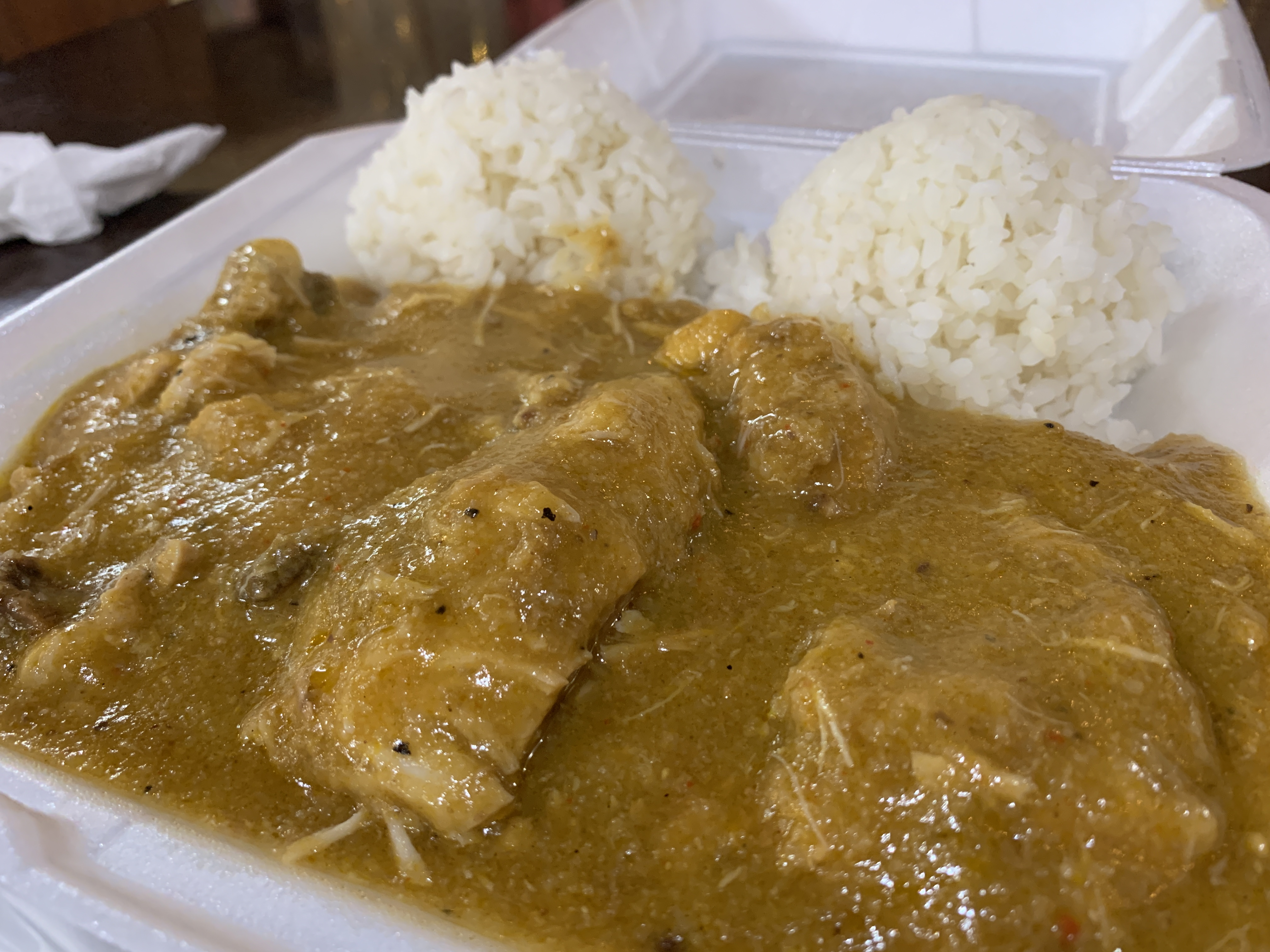
- Chalakiles
- Alternative names: Chalakilis
- Type: Soup
- Place of origin: United States
- Region or state: Guam & CNMI
- Main ingredients: chicken, garlic, onion, toasted ground rice, and coconut milk (optional)

Chalakiles is a Chamorro soup from Guam made with chicken, garlic, onion, toasted ground rice, and sometimes coconut milk. Chalakiles can be the entrée or can be served before the main dish. It is considered a comfort food. It is often found at various Chamorro festivities.

To prepare, the garlic is first sautéed in oil, then the garlic is discarded. Onions, chicken, and achote water are added to the oil. The achote provides both color and flavor. The water is boiled and chicken broth is sometimes added. Toasted ground rice is gradually mixed in. To make the toasted ground rice, rice is cooked until golden brown and then ground. Cream of Rice can be used as a substitute. The mixture is boiled until it is thickened to a desired consistency. Coconut milk is sometimes added. It is served with white rice or as a soup by itself. It is typically served hot. Some variations of this recipe use crab meat and vegetables.

Chalakiles is similar to rice porridge or Filipino arroz caldo, although chalakiles notably uses achote. The recipe is often passed from generation to generation at an early age.

== See also ==
- Cuisine of the Mariana Islands
