= Gumataotao =

Gumataotao is a surname. Notable people with the surname include:

- Peter Gumataotao (born 1958), retired rear admiral of the United States Army
- Rosa Gumataotao Rios (born 1965), American government official
