= Frank Rabon =

Chamorro dancer and choreographer

Francisco "Frank" Rabon (born 1954) is a Chamoru dancer, choreographer, and 2026 National Endowment for the Arts Fellow. He is the second artist from Guam to receive this fellowship. Starting in the 1980s, Rabon was a delegate to the Festival of Pacific Arts. In 1985, Rabon was asked to choreographed a showcase that highlights Guam for the 1985 Festival of Pacific Arts, where he chose to focus on Chamoru identity and the different forms of indigenous Chamorro dances and other Pacific Islander cultures. In 2000, he participated in the Olympic Torch Ceremony in Sydney, Australia. In 2015, he received an honorary doctorate from the University of Guam. Rabon was featured in the PBS documentary Something to Call Our Own, directed by Niel Darren Romero, which premiered on March 14, 2025. He also founded the organization Guma Taotao Tano’ (House of the People of the Land).
