= Tinaktak =

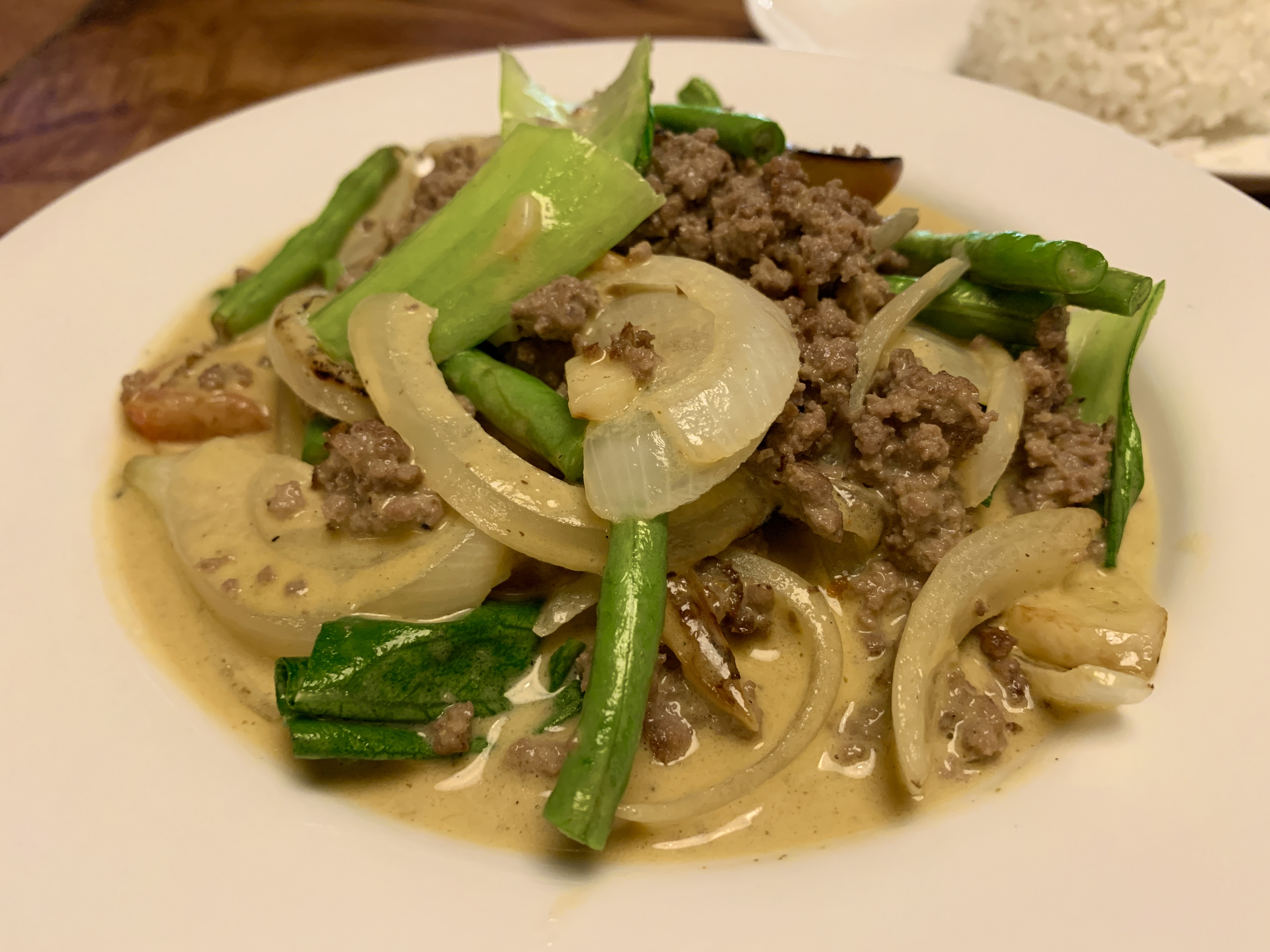
- Beef tinaktak
- Type: Stew
- Place of origin: United States
- Region or state: Guam
- Main ingredients: ground meat, coconut milk, green beans, tomatoes

Tinaktak is a Chamoru dish from the Marianas, comprising finely chopped pieces of meat with vegetables and cooked in coconut milk. The name comes from the Chamoru word taktak, an onomatopoeia from the sound of meat being chopped/tenderized. Traditionally, it is from chopped meat, but oftentimes ground meat is used. It is often cooked with beef in coconut milk, tomatoes, green beans and served with rice. Although local vegetables are often used, other vegetables can be substituted. Meatless grounds can be used to make the dish vegan. During Lent, seafood can be used as the protein. Tinaktak is often cooked in many households throughout the Mariana Islands but is also served at parties and restaurants.

== See also ==
- Cuisine of the Mariana Islands
