= Guyuria =

Traditional Chamorro cookies

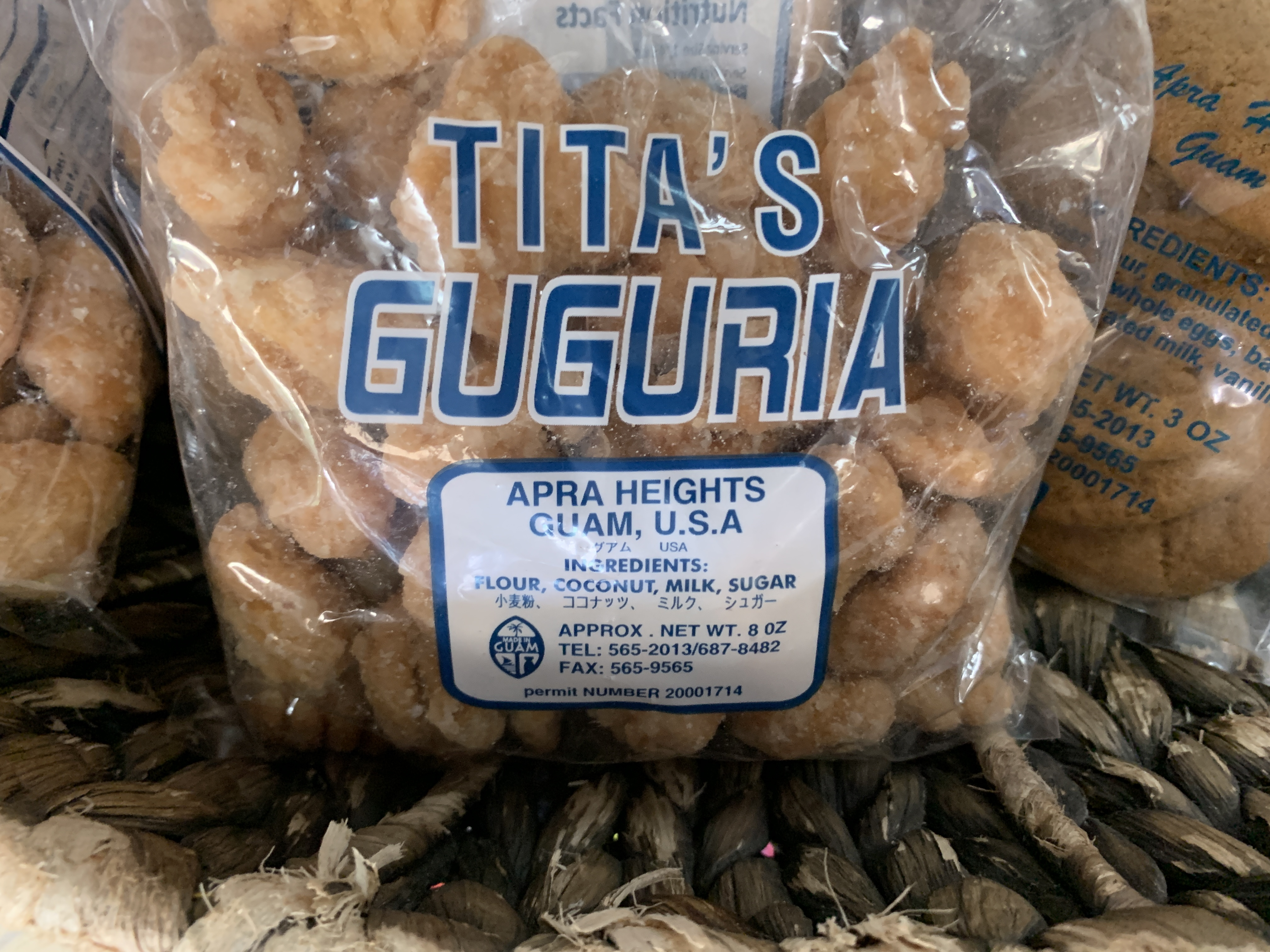
- Alternative names: Chamorro jawbreaker, goyoria, guguria
- Type: Cookie
- Main ingredients: Flour, coconut milk, sugar

Guyuria are traditional Chamorro cookies. They are also known as Chamorro jawbreaker cookies due to their historically rock-hard texture. Guyuria was originally made with flour, coconut milk, and a sugar glaze. The dough is first made as one solid mass. Small pieces of dough are pinched off. Each piece is rolled out on a wooden guyuria board or on the back of a fork. Once enough cookies are formed, a batch is fried, cooled, and finally coated with a sugar glaze. The glaze is then allowed to dry on the cookies.

Some recipes include butter in the dough mixture. This results in a slightly softer cookie. Other guyuria dough recipes include sugar, baking powder, and eggs. Guyuria recipes with baking powder and eggs, however, lead to cookies that are too inflated and soft.

== See also ==
- Cuisine of the Mariana Islands
