= Cuisine of the Mariana Islands =

Culinary traditions of the Mariana Islands

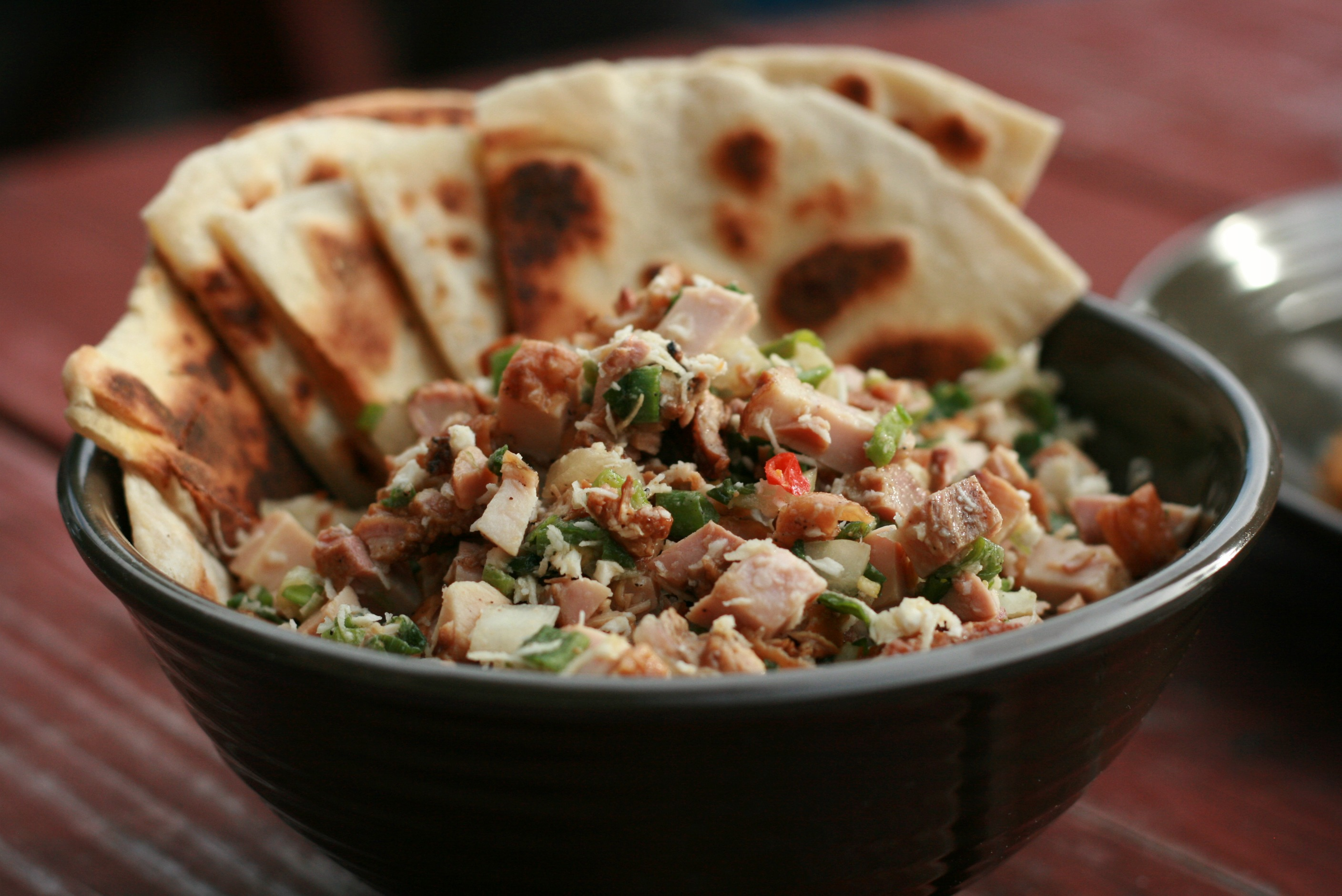
Kelaguen, raw meats, green onions, donni’ peppers cooked with citrus and served with titiyas

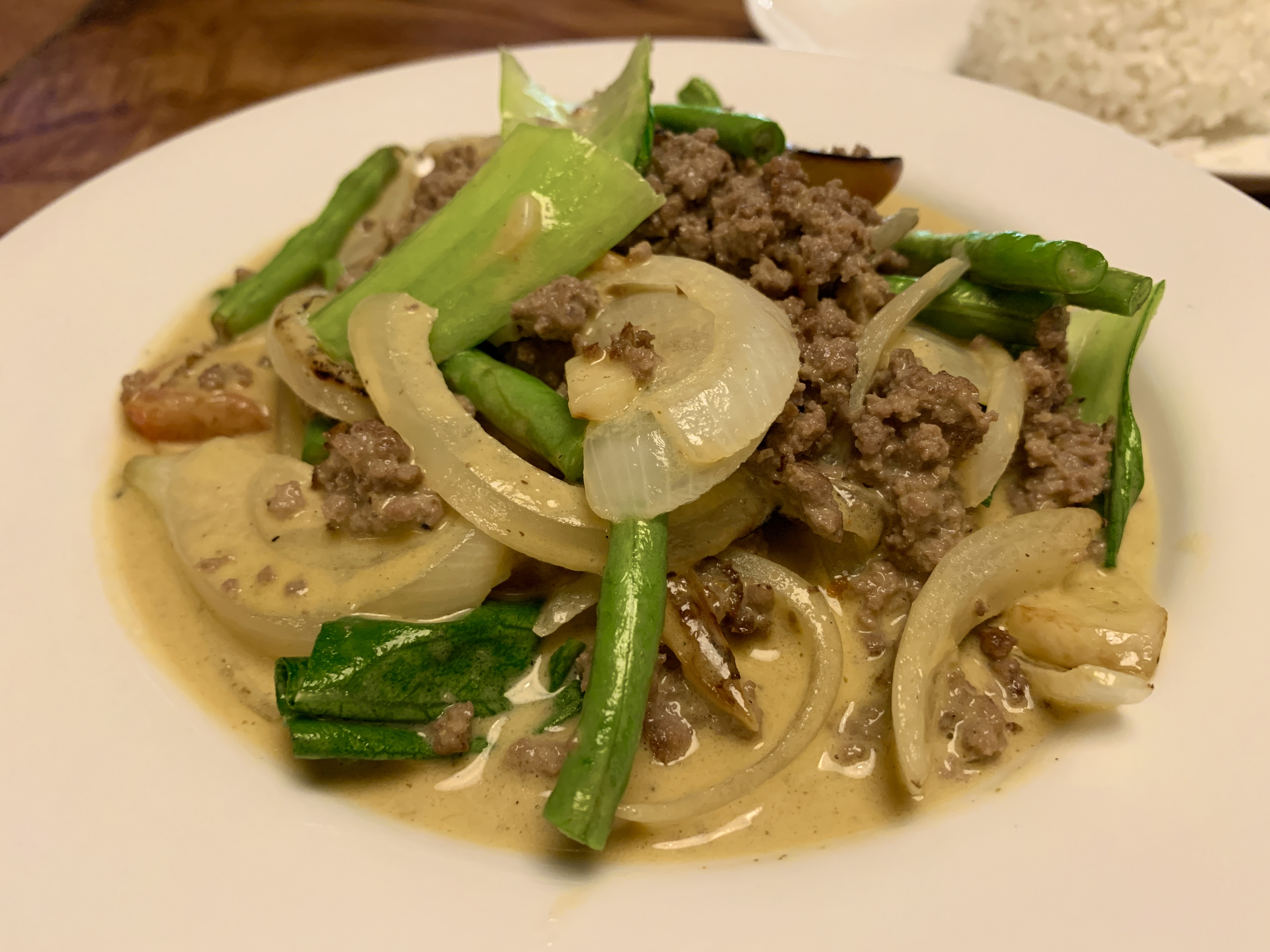
Tinaktak, finely ground meat cooked in coconut milk with vegetables

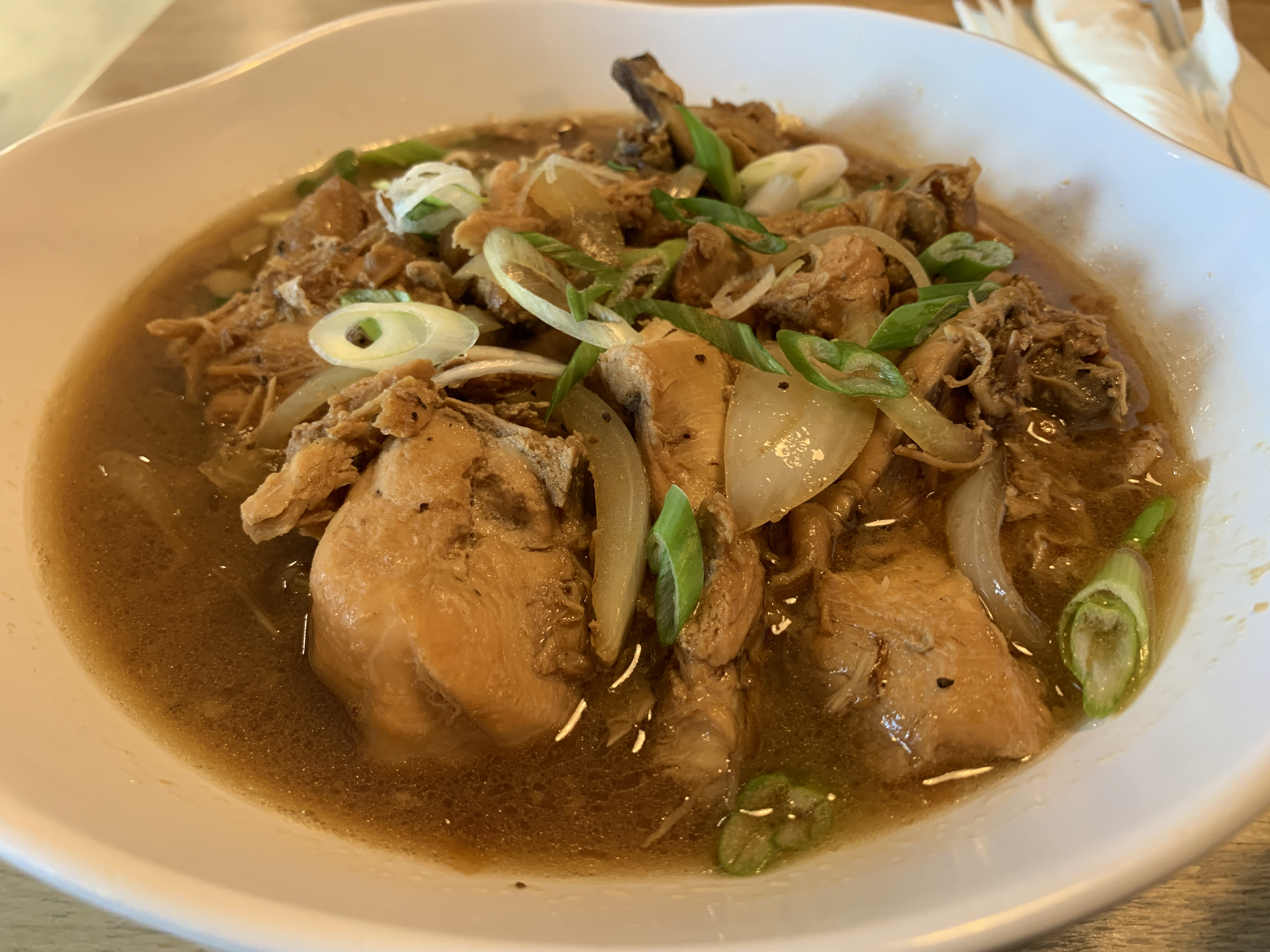
Estufao, a stewed meat dish similar to kåddun pika

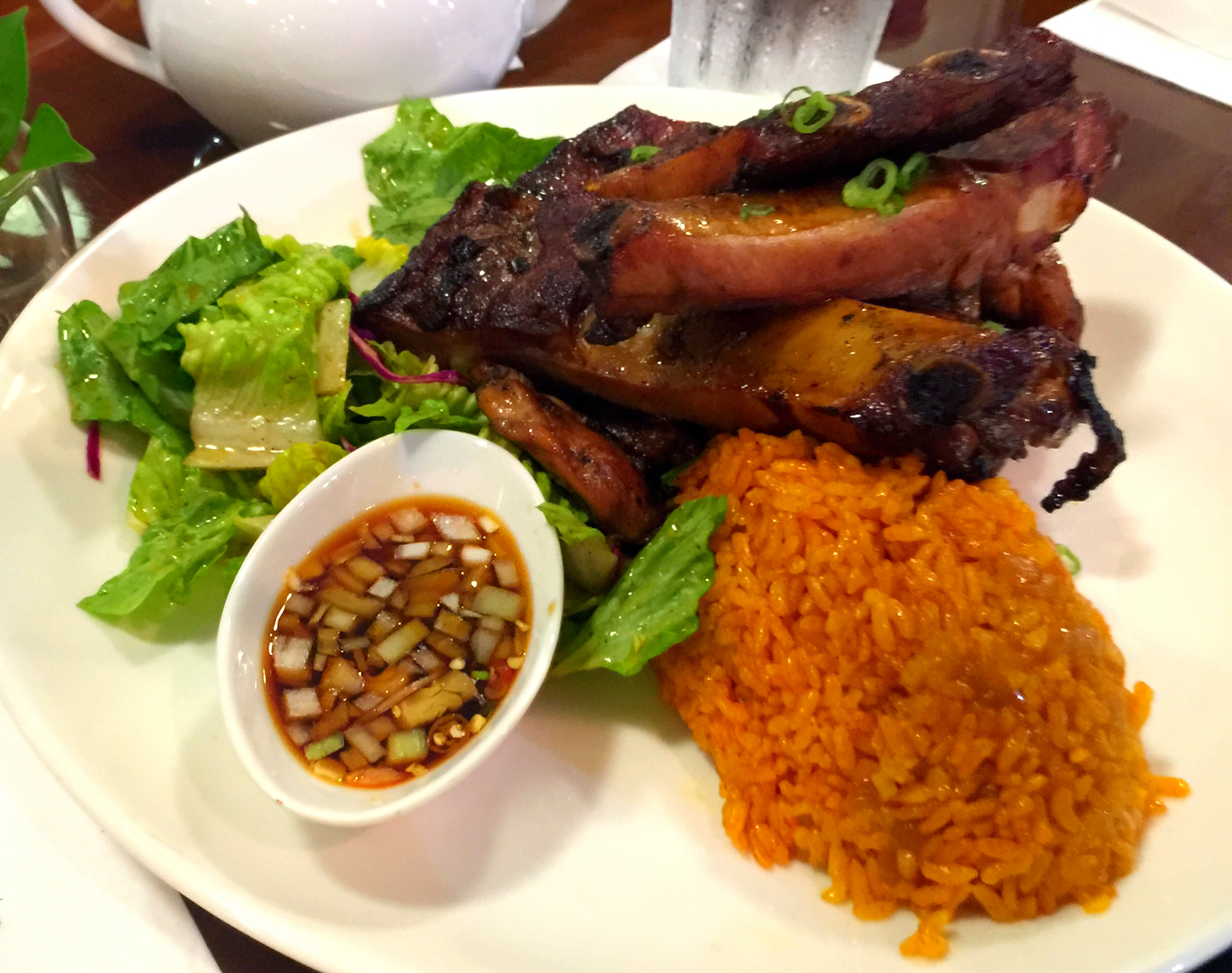
A meal served on Guam, with fina'denne' (the sauce) and Chamorro red rice

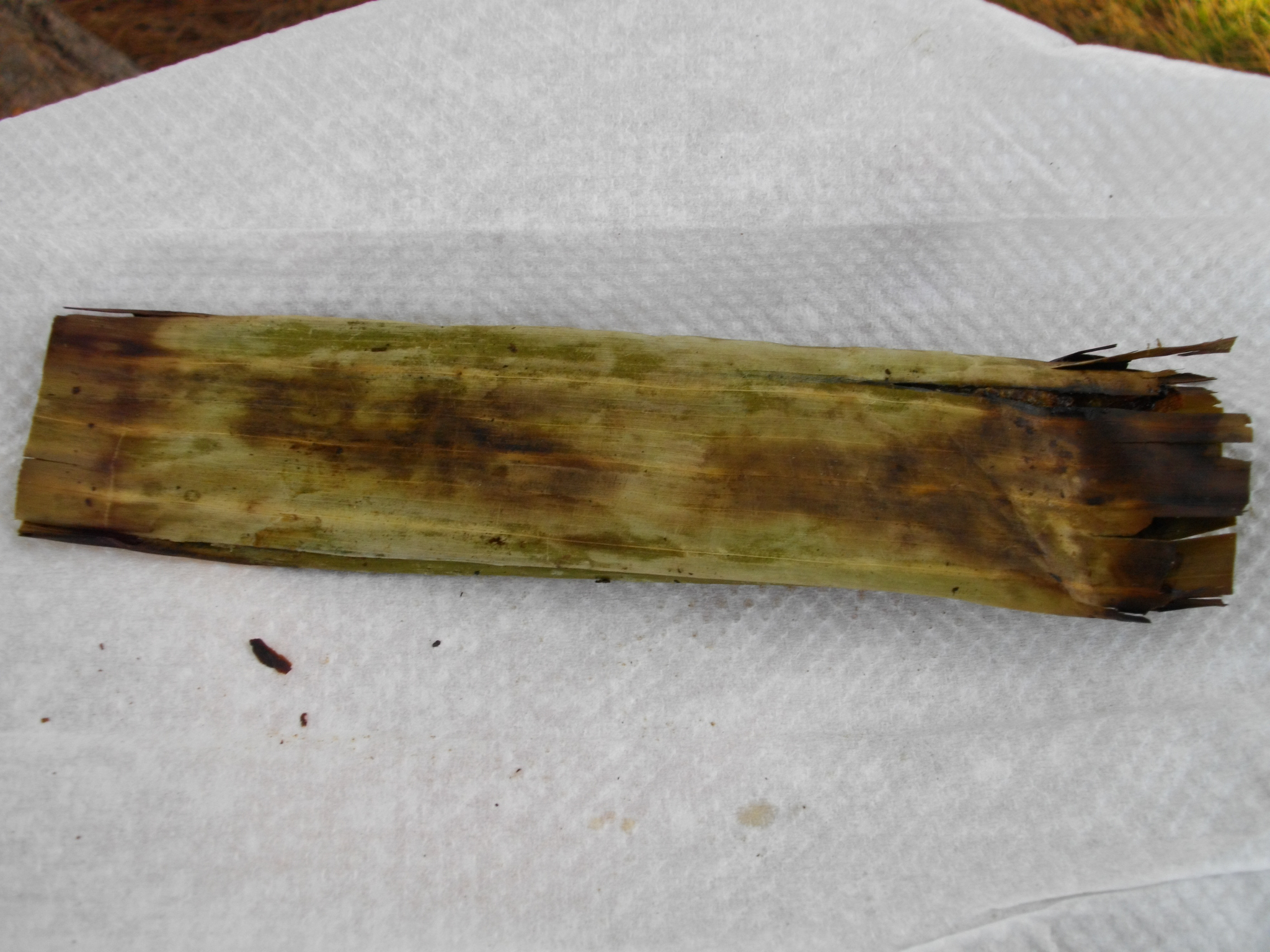
Apigigi’, roasted coconut in a banana leaf

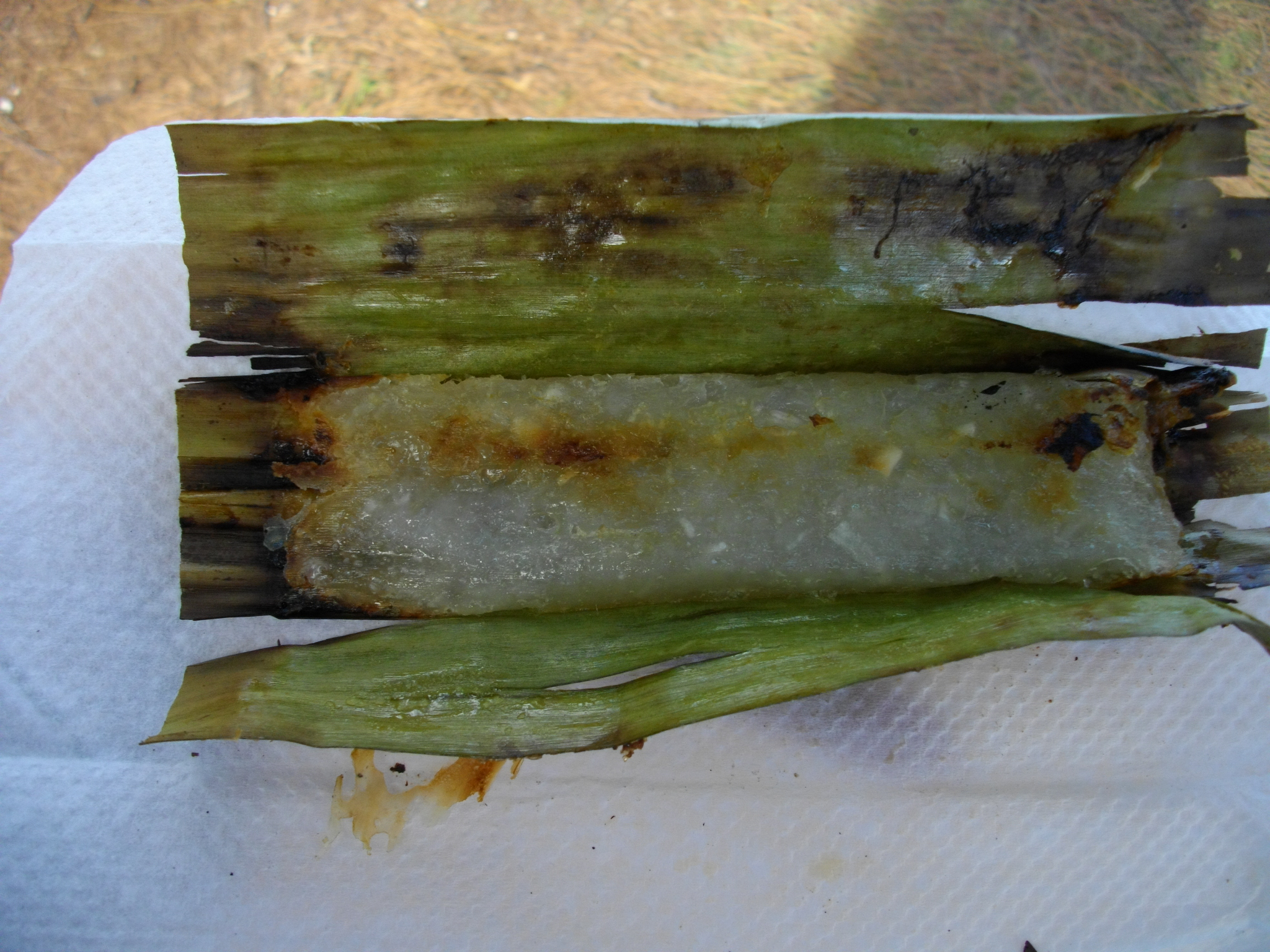
The Apigigi opened up showing filling

The cuisine of the Mariana Islands is largely made up of meat dishes, including pork, poultry, and meat from other land mammals. Some popular land animals consumed include Mariana fruit bat (fanihi in Chamorro). Guam and the Northern Marianas split in 1899, when Spain transferred Guam to the United States but the northern islands to Germany (later occupied by Japan), and so there are many similarities, especially the Chamorro food culture.

Like in many other archipelagos, the islands' surrounding waters make seafood another popular option. Some seafoods include sea cucumbers and various fish. It is said that the Mariana Islands’ cuisine is heavily influenced by its neighbors’ Papuan, Hawaiian, and American cuisines. The Marianas’ cuisine is international, with many dishes, such as Korean kimchi, Filipino pancit and Spanish empanadas being enjoyed on the islands.

The food of Guam and the Marianas is closely related, because it is linked by the traditions of the Chamorro people that inhabit this island chain. The northern Marianas had additional German, Japanese, and Carolinas’ influences, although in modern times the region is also influenced by Filipino, American, and Japanese food cultures. The core island culture is heavily influenced by what is available to eat, especially marine and island flora and fauna, combined with traditions of people and history. A good example of this is the donni’ såli chili pepper, which was brought centuries ago by sailing ships from the Americas, and is important for fina'denni' sauce.

== Specialties ==
Some of the most well known local specialties are kelaguen, a Chamorro dish consisting of chicken, shrimp, fish or beef marinated in a mix of lemon juice and fresh coconut, red rice made with annatto and kå'du fanihi, a soup made of fruit bat or flying fox and Guyuria cookies. The red rice is hineksa’ aga’ga, is made by cooking rice in annatto broth, giving it a deep orange color. Other noted foods include lumpia (spring roll), shrimp patties, and Spam musubi, which is grilled Spam with pickled daigo radish wrapped in nori. Apigigi’ is a Chamorro dish in which roasted coconut is wrapped in banana leaf. The shrimp patties, or buñelos uhang, are a sort of shrimp fritter, with a mix of shrimp, vegetables, and batter which are then deep fried.

A traditional ingredient of Chamorro food is a variety of spice-hot chili pepper called the donni’ såli. This pepper, thought to have been introduced by the Spanish in the 1600s (chili pepper is native to the Americas), grows wild on Guam and the Northern Marianas. It is a type of Capsicum frutescens and is very popular part of the culinary aspects and food culture of the islands.(see also List of Capsicum cultivars) It is also commonly eaten by birds which have spread it around the islands, and is also called a Boonie pepper. The sauce made from this pepper is called fina'denni', and is a staple condiment of Chamorro dishes. Translated, it simply means "made from donni' ", the Chamorro word for chili pepper. The sauce fina’denni’ can be made with soy sauce and vinegar (dark fina’denni’) or with lemon juice and vinegar (white fina’denni’). The white fina’denni’ sauce is used in making Chamorro cured beef called Tinala' Kåtni.

The canned meat Spam is extremely popular in the Marianas and Saipan.

Guam is also the highest per-capita consumer of Tabasco sauce in the world.

The islands are home to many types of restaurants, with Korean, Japanese, Thai, American food, often serving a mix of styles. (see also Fusion cuisine)

There is a meal called a fiesta plate that often combines several traditional island foods, such as "red rice, barbecued ribs and chicken, pancit, chicken kelaguen, and shrimp patties." A smaller plate is called nene (for "baby") plate, which is a smaller portion.

List of traditional dishes:

- Buñelos uhang (shrimp fritter).
- Chalakiles/Charakilis
- Chamorro red rice
- Estufao
- Fina'denni' (spicy sauce)
- Guyuria (Chamorro cookie)
- Kåddun pika
- Kalamai (coconut pudding)
- Kelaguen
- Latiya (Guam) or Lantiyas (CNMI) (Chamorro cake)
- Rosketti (cornstarch cookie)
- Tinaktak (chopped meat and vegetables in coconut milk)
- Tinala' Kåtni (beef dish)
- Apigigi (coconut mixture roasted in a banana leaf)

Some of the most noted dishes on Guam, the largest island of the Marianas island chain, include Chamorro red rice, grilled meat, fina’denne’, tamales gisu, chalakiles, Fillipino lumpia, kådu, kelaguen, titiyas, and latiya.

== See also ==
- List of Oceanian cuisines
- Culture of Guam
- Category:Cuisine of Guam
