= Tinala' katne =

Chamorro beef dish

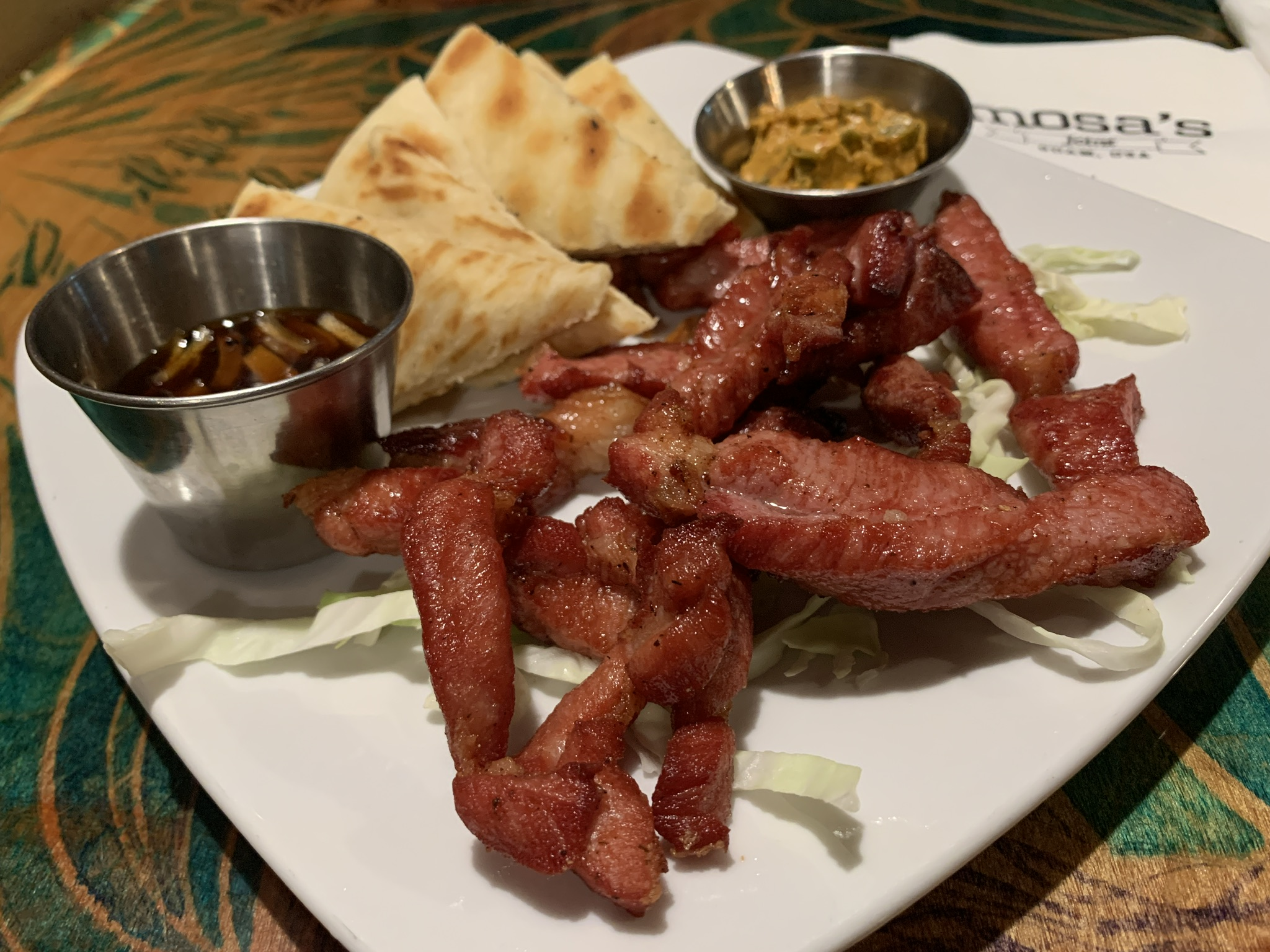
- Tinala' katne
- Type: Jerky
- Course: Appetizer, side dish
- Place of origin: United States
- Region or state: Guam
- Main ingredients: Beef, spices

Tinala' katne is a Chamoru dish of dried and cured beef strips similar to beef jerky from the Marianas. It is often found at parties (fiestas) and is offered by some restaurants. It tends to have a softer texture than other types of beef jerky and is more of a side dish than a snack.

== Etymology ==
The word Tinala comes from the Chamoru root word tåla, meaning "to dry". Katne is from the Spanish word "carne" or meat. Thus, the translation of "dried meat" can be derived.

== Origin ==
During the Spanish settlement in the 17th century to the Mariana Islands, they brought cattle. Before their arrival the Chamoru diet primarily consisted of seafood, along with staple foods like taro, yam, breadfruit, and bananas. Traditionally, men would butcher the cows but now beef is primarily imported and prepackaged at grocery stores. Prior to refrigeration, the women would carry around tins of the dish for sale.

== Preparation ==
The beef strips are commonly seasoned with a mixture of salt, black pepper, and garlic. Soy sauce and vinegar can also be used. The beef strips are marinated in the mixture. Then they are dried using an oven, a fire, or left out to hang for a few days or in the sun. The traditional method is letting it dry in the sun. Prior to serving, the tinala' katne can be heated on a grill or in the oven.

== See also ==
- Cuisine of the Mariana Islands
