= Fina'denne' =

Condiment used in Chamorro cuisine

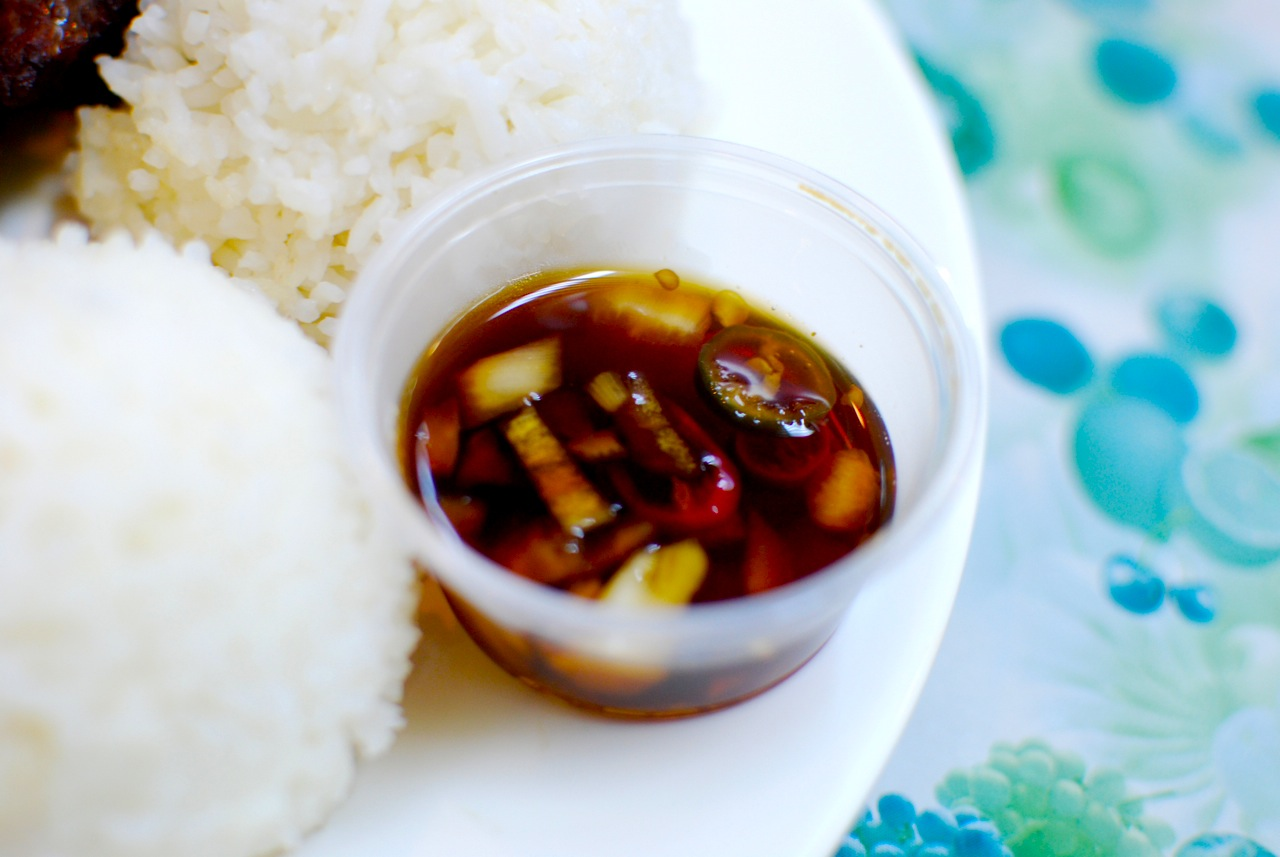
The common soy sauce-based fina'denne'

Fina'denne' (many alternate spellings, commonly finadene, fina'denni', or fina'dene) is a spicy, all-purpose condiment that is a staple of Chamorro cuisine. In the Chamorro language, it translates as "made with chili pepper." It may be drizzled over meat dish or rice, or placed in a separate, small dipping saucer. Anthropologists visiting Guam in the early 20th century noted the frequent use of fina'denne' by Chamorros.

== History ==
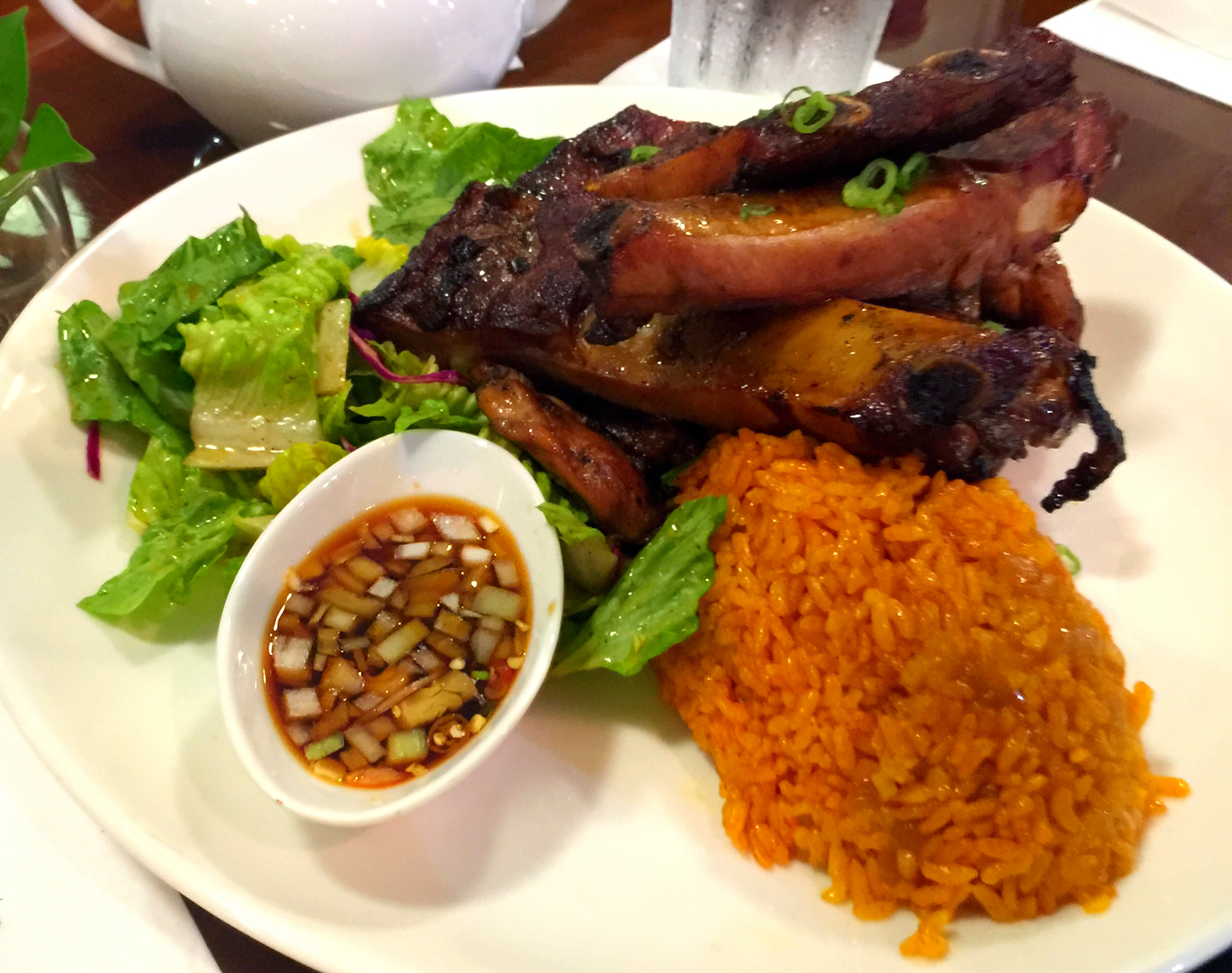
Fina'denne' served with ribs and Chamorro red rice, traditionally colored with annatto seeds

There are many historical and contemporary versions of fina'denne'. The earliest fina'denne', predating Spanish colonization in the late seventeenth century, was simply salt and pepper. Filipino immigrants during the Spanish period introduced the technique of tapping coconut trees and fermenting the sap to make tubâ vinegar. The fina'denne' of this time was made with tubâ, salt, lemon, water, and fresh pepper. The Japanese subsequently introduced soy sauce to the Mariana Islands, resulting in the typical contemporary version of fina'denne' with soy sauce, lemon juice, onion, and fresh Mariana bird peppers, known locally as "donne' sali" or "boonie peppers." The acidic ingredient may also be white vinegar, cider vinegar, coconut vinegar, or lime.

Other versions that are still made are binakle fina'denne' made with tubâ; chigu'an fina'denne', made with fish brine and resembling fish sauces of Southeast Asia; and a common fina'denne' made entirely with lemon and no soy sauce. Soy sauce-based fina'denne' typically accompanies red meat, pork, and chicken dishes. Lemon-based fina'denne' is typically used for fish and more delicately flavoured dishes.

== See also ==
- List of dips
- List of sauces
- Cuisine of the Mariana Islands
