= Maria Anderson Roberto =

CHamoru Naval Nurse Chaperone from 1914-1924

- Born: 1880; Guam
- Died: Culion
- Occupation: Nurse
- Employer: United States Navy

Maria Anderson Roberto (born 1880) was a chaperone for the Native Nurses program in Guam from 1914 to 1924 during the US Naval occupation of the island.

== Early life ==
Roberto was born in 1880 on Guam.

== Career ==
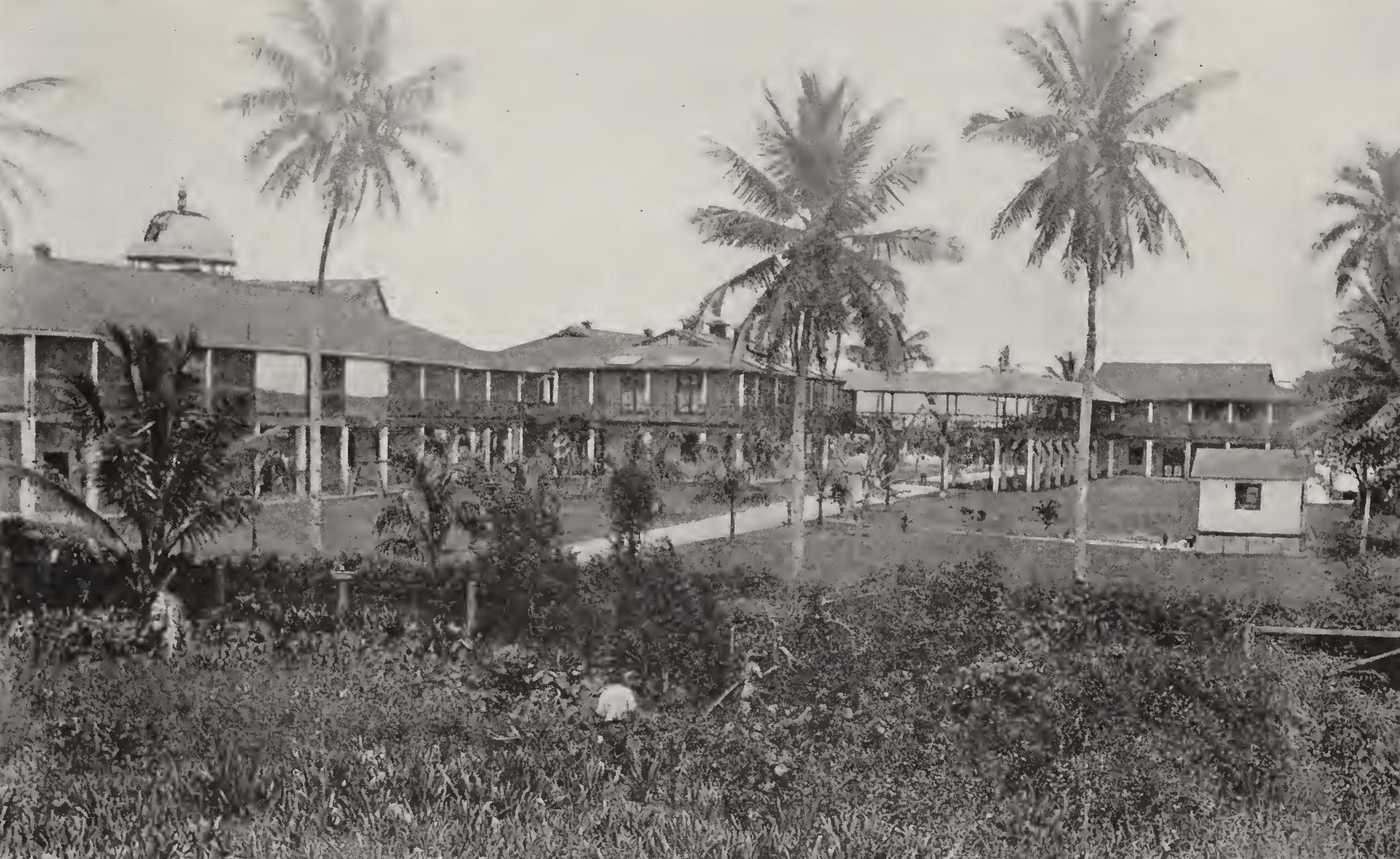
Guam's naval hospital in 1917, while Roberto was a Nurse Chaperone

In 1914, Roberto was hired by the US navy as a chaperone for the Native Nurses program. Roberto's employment as a nurse chaperone was a concession by the US Navy, who realized they needed a culturally-appropriate woman to care for the CHamoru nursing students. In CHamoru culture, unmarried women were always accompanied by a chaperone, who was typically an older woman or close male relative. Her presence allowed these women to participate in the program without breaking cultural traditions. She protected and nurtured the students as they trained at the naval hospital, helping them pass exams and serving as a "surrogate mother." Additionally, as a respected CHamoru woman, Roberto bridged the general distrust for the naval administration and Western healthcare practices. She was an important intermediary figure, translating between Chamorro and English. In Della Knight's 1922 tribute, which was published in the American Journal of Nursing, she stated that Roberto held "together the fabric of the work built up by the Navy nurses." She was well-respected by parents, students, and navy hospital staff.

== Hansen's disease diagnosis and death ==
In 1924, Roberto contracted Hansen's Disease. She was deported to Culion, where the US Navy had established a leper colony. Roberto's deportation caused mass community outrage and grief throughout the island.

Her fate after deportation is unknown. It is assumed she died on the island.
