= Peter Gumataotao =

United States Navy admiral

Peter A.Gumataotao
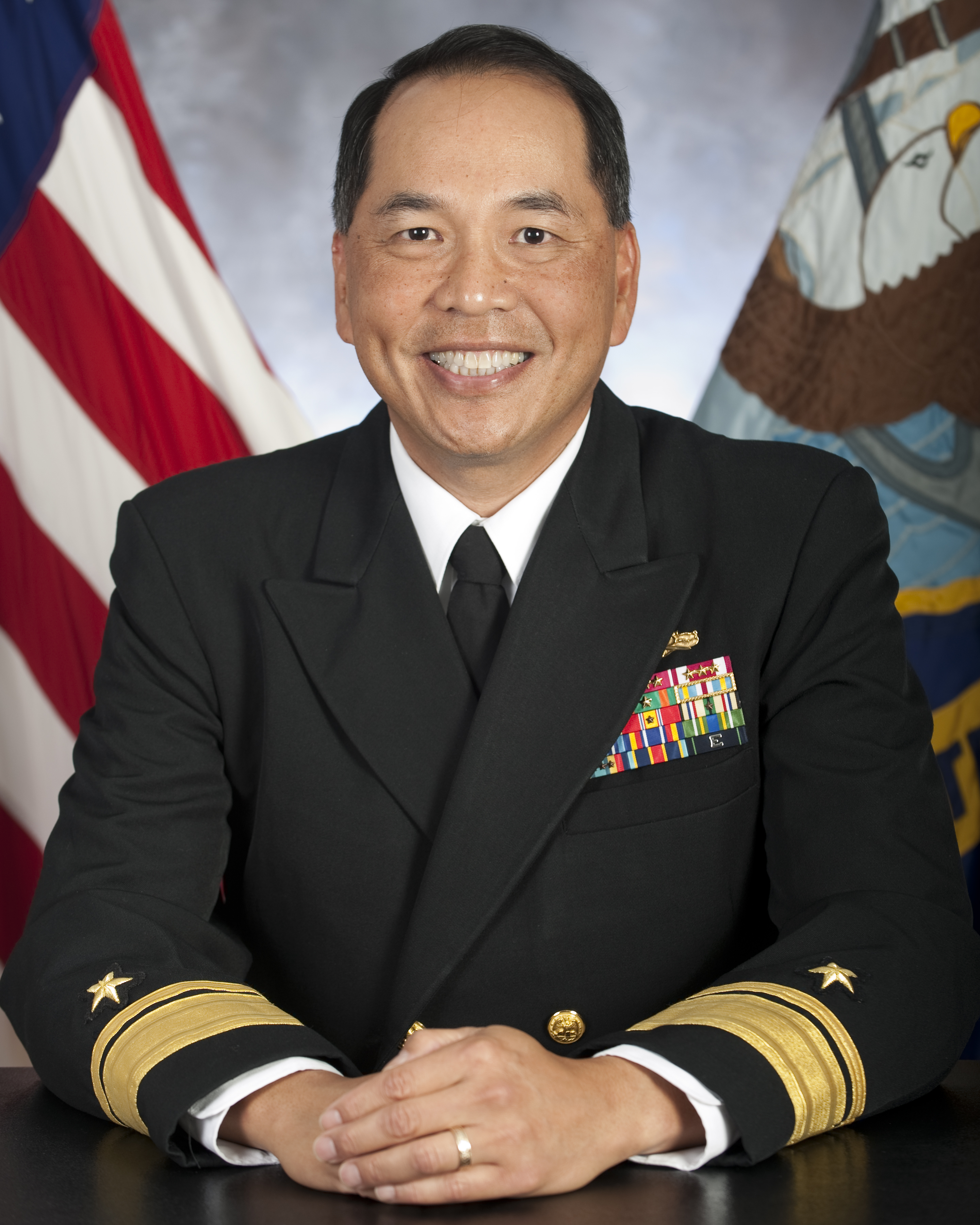
- Born: 1958 (age 67–68); Guam, United States
- Military career
- Allegiance: United States
- Branch: United States Navy
- Service years: 1981–2017
- Rank: Rear admiral
- Commands: Naval Surface Force Atlantic; Carrier Strike Group 11; United States Naval Forces Korea; Destroyer Squadron 31; USS Curtis Wilbur (DDG-54); USS Decatur (DDG-73)
- Conflicts: Operation Enduring Freedom
- Awards: Defense Superior Service Medal; Legion of Merit; Meritorious Service Medal

Peter Aguon Gumataotao (born 1958) is the current director of the Daniel K. Inouye Asia-Pacific Center for Security Studies (DKI APCSS) and a retired rear admiral (upper half) of the United States Navy. As a rear admiral (lower half), he was the commander of Carrier Strike Group Eleven which consists of USS Nimitz (CVN-68), aircraft of Carrier Air Wing Eleven, and surface ships and submarines of Destroyer Squadron 23. In 2012 he was nominated for promotion to rear admiral (upper half).

Gumataotao enlisted in the Navy in 1976 and was selected to attend the Naval Academy Preparatory School in Newport, Rhode Island, before going on to attend the United States Naval Academy in Annapolis, Maryland. He graduated in 1981 and later earned an M.A. in strategic studies from the Naval War College in 1994.
