= Chamorro people =

Indigenous people of the Mariana Islands

Chamorro Chamoru
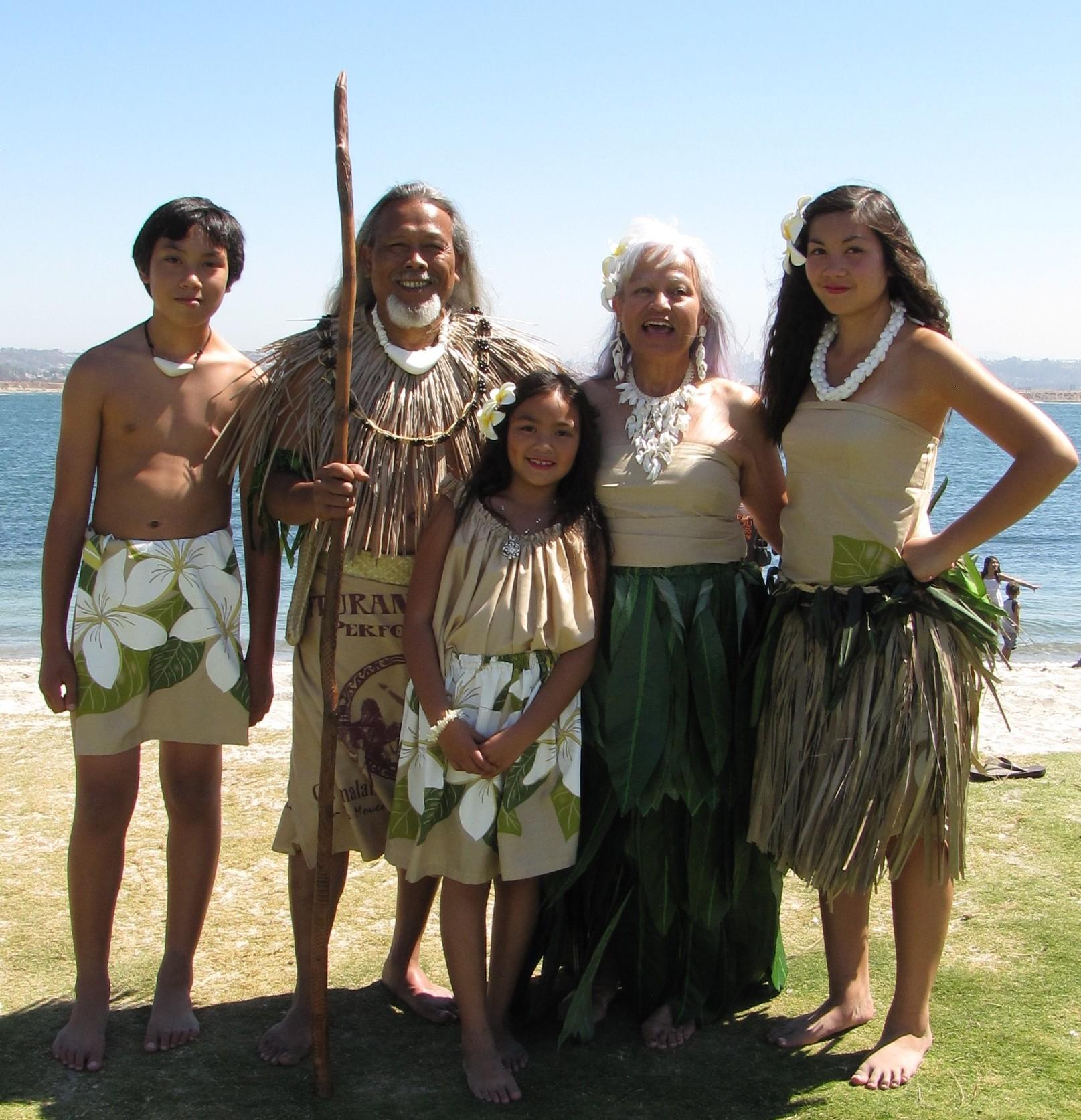
- Chamorro performers at the Pacific Islander Festival Association in San Diego, 2010

Total population
- > 168,000 (2020)

Regions with significant populations
- United States
- Guam: 63,035 (50,420 of full ancestry) (2020 census)
- Northern Mariana Islands: 17,163 (12,001 of full ancestry) (2020 census)
- Micronesia: 1,200
- Total United States: 168,226 (81,287 of full ancestry) (2020)

Languages
- Chamorro (native); English (auxiliary)

Religion
- Predominantly Roman Catholic

Related ethnic groups
- Other Micronesians

The Chamorro people (/tʃɑːˈmɔːroʊ, tʃə-/; also CHamoru) are the Indigenous people of the Mariana Islands, politically divided between the United States territory of Guam and the encompassing Commonwealth of the Northern Mariana Islands in Micronesia, a commonwealth of the US. Today, significant Chamorro populations also exist in several US states, including Hawaii, California, Washington, Texas, Tennessee, Oregon, and Nevada, all of which together are designated as Pacific Islander Americans according to the US census. According to the 2020 census, about 63,035 people with Chamorro ancestry live in Guam and another 17,163 live in the Northern Marianas. Among those, 50,420 identified as Chamorro alone (i.e. no other race) in Guam and 12,001 in Northern Marianas.

== Etymology ==
Precolonial society in the Marianas was based on a caste system, Chamori being the name of the ruling, highest caste.

After Spain annexed and colonized the Marianas, the caste system eventually became extinct under Spanish rule, and all of the Indigenous residents of the archipelago eventually came to be referred to by the Spanish exonym Chamorro. The name CHamoru is an endonym derived from the Indigenous orthography of the Spanish exonym. The digraph ch is treated as a single letter, hence both characters are capitalized at the beginning of a sentence or proper noun, much like ij in Dutch.

Some people theorize that Spanish definitions of the word Chamorro played a role in its being used to refer to the island's Indigenous inhabitants. Not only is "Chamorro" a Spanish surname; in Spanish it also means "leg of pork", "beardless [wheat]", "bald", "close-cropped", or "shorn/shaven/[hair or wool] cut close to the surface". Around 1670, a Catholic missionary reported that men were sporting a style in which their heads were shaven, save for a "finger-length" amount of hair at the crown. This hairstyle has often been portrayed in modern-day depictions of early Chamorros, but the first European descriptions of the physical appearance of the Chamorro people in the 1520s and 1530s report that both sexes had long black hair, which they wore down to their waists or even further. Another description, given about 50 years later, reported that the Native people at that time were tying up their hair into one or two topknots.

Chamorro institutions on Guam advocate for the spelling CHamoru, as reflected in the 2017 Guam Public Law 33-236. In 2018, the Commission on the CHamoru Language and the Teaching of the History and Culture of the Indigenous People of Guam announced CHamoru as the preferred standardized spelling of the language and people, as opposed to the conventional spelling Chamorro.

== Language ==
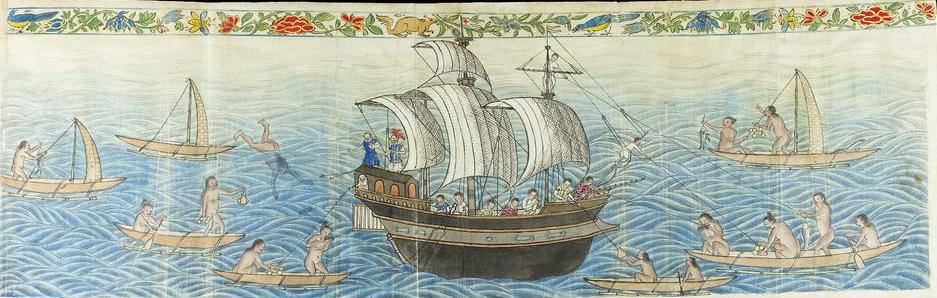
Reception of a Manila galleon by the Chamorro in the Ladrones Islands, circa 1590 Boxer Codex

The Chamorro language is included in the Malayo-Polynesian subgroup of the Austronesian family. Because Guam was colonized by Spain for over 300 years, Chamorro has acquired many loanwords from Spanish. An example is how the traditional Chamorro number system was replaced by Spanish numbers.

Chamorro is often spoken in many homes, but this is becoming less common. However, a resurgence of interest in reviving the language has occurred, and all public schools on both Guam and the Northern Marianas are now required by law to teach the Chamorro language as part of the elementary-, middle-, and high-school curriculum.

A commonly spoken phrase in Chamorro is håfa adai, a greeting which approximates "hello" in English.

== History ==
=== Early Chamorros ===
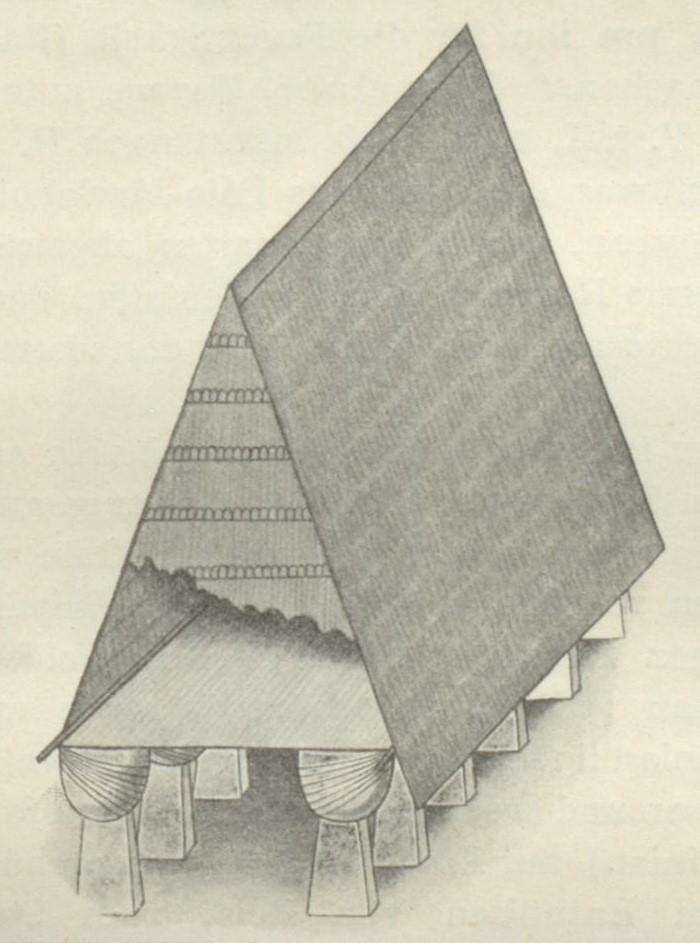
Reconstruction of how latte stone structures may have appeared

The Chamorros are commonly believed to have arrived in the Marianas Islands from the Philippines c. 1,500 BC. They are most closely related to other Austronesian-speaking native people from the Philippines, eastern Indonesia (specifically in Maluku and Sulawesi), Taiwanese aborigines, and peoples of the Caroline Islands to the south (in particular the outer islands of the Federated States of Micronesia state of Yap). Recent advanced DNA testing conducted on the remains of ancient Chamorros showed that the lineage of both the Unai and the Latte periods originated during the Holocene Epoch in eastern Indonesia, most likely Sulawesi, with no direct prehistoric connection to the Philippines. They were expert seafarers and skilled craftspeople familiar with intricate weaving and detailed pottery-making. The latte stone, a megalithic rock pillar topped with a hemispherical capstone, was used by early Chamorros as foundation for buildings, and has since been appropriated as a national symbol.

Chamorro society was based on what sociologist Lawrence J. Cunningham termed the "matrilineal avuncuclan", one characteristic of which is that the brother(s) of the female parent plays a more primary paternal role than biological male parent of a child.

==== Agriculture ====
Spanish colonial records show that Chamorro farmers planted seeds according to the phases of the moon. For example, farmers on Guam often plant tuber crops such as sweet potato and yams at full moon during low tide.

According to the University of Guam (UOG), Unibetsedåt Guåhan, the history of Agriculture on Guam had an outstanding number of farms reported in the year of 1940. With a high number of reports in 1975 and a decline in 2007, those involved field crop production, livestock and poultry, fish and agriculture. Based on the data, market crop sales decreased and a number of agricultural production is unrecognized.

==== Culture ====
===== Cosmogony and religion =====
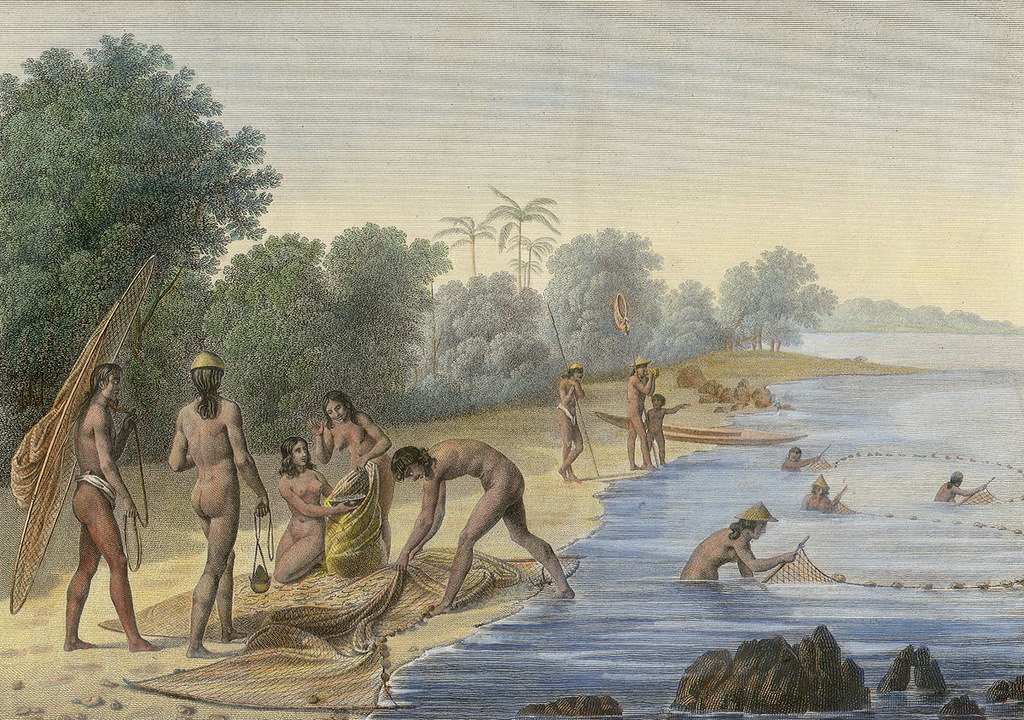
Chamorros fishing, 1819

According to early Chamorro legend, the world was created by a twin brother and sister, Puntan and Fu'uña. As he lay dying, Puntan instructed his sister Fu'uña to make his body into the ingredients of the universe. She used his eyes to create the Sun and Moon, his eyebrows to make rainbows, and most of the rest of his parts into various features of the Earth. Once her work was complete, she descended on an island called "Guåhan", and transformed herself into a giant rock. This rock split, and from it emerged all human beings. Some believe that this rock was once located at the site of a church in Agat, while others believe it is the phallic-shaped Laso de Fua located in Fouha Bay in Umatac.

Ancient Chamorros engaged in ancestor veneration, but did not practice a formal "religion" in the sense of worshiping deities. At least one account by Christoph Carl Fernberger in 1623 holds that human sacrifice was practiced to placate a "great fish". This claim may be related to a Chamorro legend about why the island of Guam is narrow in the middle. According to the legend, a gigantic fish was gradually eating away at the island from both sides. Although the ancient Chamorros supposedly had magical abilities, the huge creature eluded them. When the men were unsuccessful in hunting it down, the women used their hair to weave a net, which grew larger as they sang. The singing enchanted the fish, and lured it into the giant net.

Enraged that Father Diego Luis de San Vitores had baptized his child, a Chamorro man and his friend killed the priest and Filipino catechist Pedro Calungsod in April 1672, dumping their bodies in the ocean.

===== Castes and classes =====
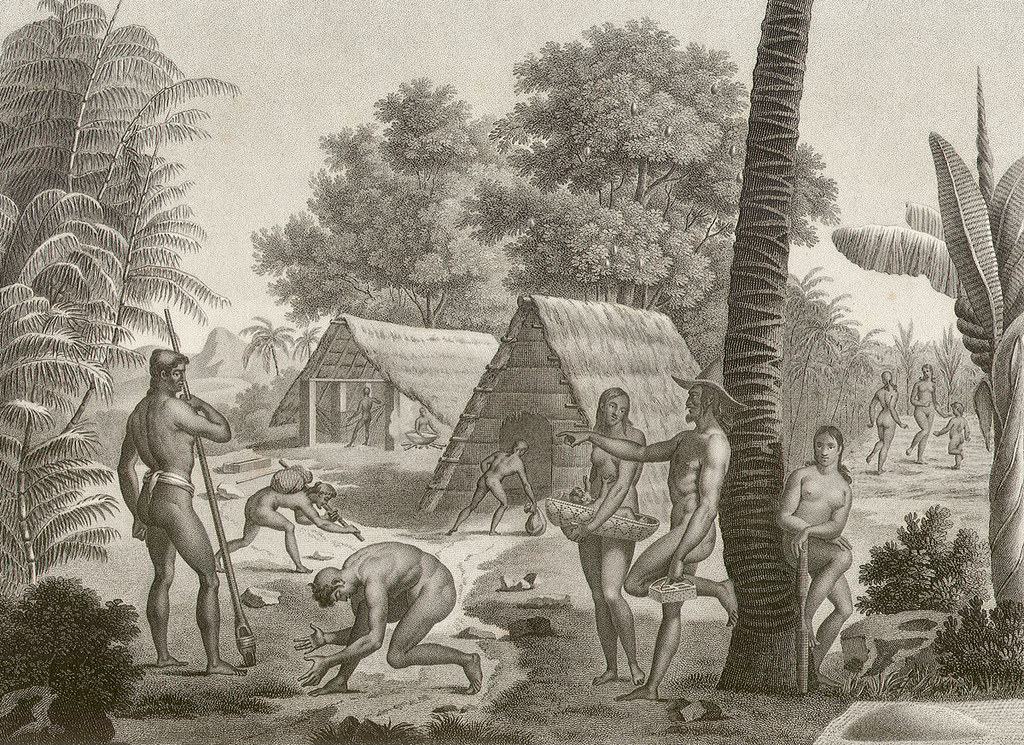
Village scene depicting caste differences, 1819. Apart from the man at the far left, all men and women are depicted as fully nude.

Chamorro society was divided into two main castes, and continued to be so for well over a century after the Spanish first arrived. According to historical records provided by Europeans, such as Father Charles Le Gobien, apparent racial differences existed between the subservient Manachang caste, and the higher Chamor[r]i, the Manachang being described as shorter, darker-skinned, and physically less hardy than the Chamori. The Chamori caste was further subdivided into the upper-middle class Achoti/Acha'ot and the highest, the ruling Matua/Matao class. Achoti could gain status as Matua, and Matua could be reduced to Achoti, but Manachang were born and died as such and had no recourse to improve their station. Members of the Manachang and the Chamori were not permitted to intermingle. All three classes performed physical labor, but had specifically different duties. Le Gobien theorized that Chamorro society comprised the geographical convergence of peoples of different ethnic origins. This idea may be supportable by the evidence of linguistic characteristics of the Chamorro language and social customs.

===== Clothing and beauty practices =====
Prior to Spanish contact, Chamorro boys and men wore no clothing and went about fully nude at all times. Chamorro girls went nude until around the age of eight to ten, at which point they began to wear a small genital covering made either of bark, one or more leaves, a piece of a turtle shell or in some cases matting. Both sexes at times wore hats of woven leaves to protect themselves from the sun.

Father Pierre Coomans wrote of the practice among Chamorro women of teeth blackening/dental lacquering (also a widespread custom in ancient Maritime Southeast Asia, Japan, Southeastern China, and parts of Indochina), which they considered beautiful as a distinction apart from animals. Fernberger wrote in his account of the Chamorros that "penis pins" were employed as a chastity measure for young males, a type of genital piercing similar to those employed by inhabitants of precolonial maritime Southeast Asia.

===== Folklore =====
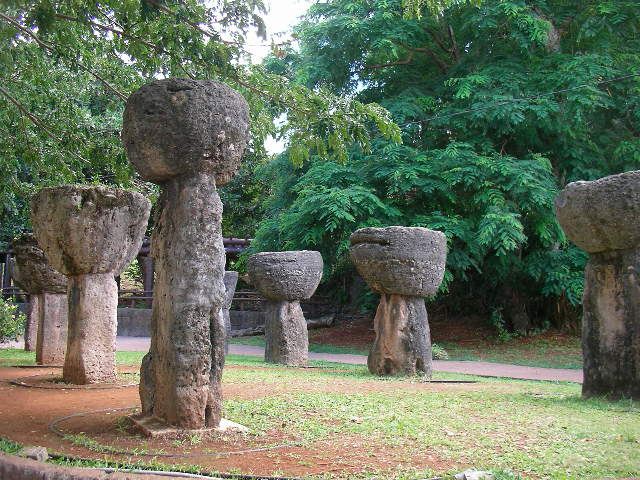
Taotaomona are believed to live near Latte stones

The Chamorro creation story revolves around two celestial siblings named Puntan and Fu'una. In time, this creation story underwent a series of modifications due to the complications in passing the story along from generation to generation. In this Chamorro creation story, Puntan and Fu'una create the world with their body parts and souls. Puntan's various body parts were turned into the land, his chest into the sky, his eyebrows into rainbows, and his eyes into the sun and moon. Fu’una having the ability to give life, brought the sun, soil, and waters to life, and with a final transformation, she turned into stone and gave birth to the Chamorro people. Evidence supporting this creation story can be seen through the names of the villages on Guam as they are named after body parts. Barrigada translates to flank, Tiyan translates to stomach, Hagatna translates to blood and Mongmong translates to a heartbeat.

Taotaomo'na are spirits of ancient Chamorros. Birak is a broader term that may refer not only to the undead, but also to demons or general elemental types. Taotaomona essentially translates to "people of early times," referring to the ancestors of the Chamorro peoples. The Taotaomona is a supernatural ancestral spirit that Chamorros and some neighboring islanders from Rota and Saipan believe in. The Taotaomona possess a strength that far exceeds man and has the ability to cause sickness and death to those who offend them. The appearance of a Taotaomona can vary as they can be a female or male and can take an attractive form or a monstrous form.

=== Spanish rule ===
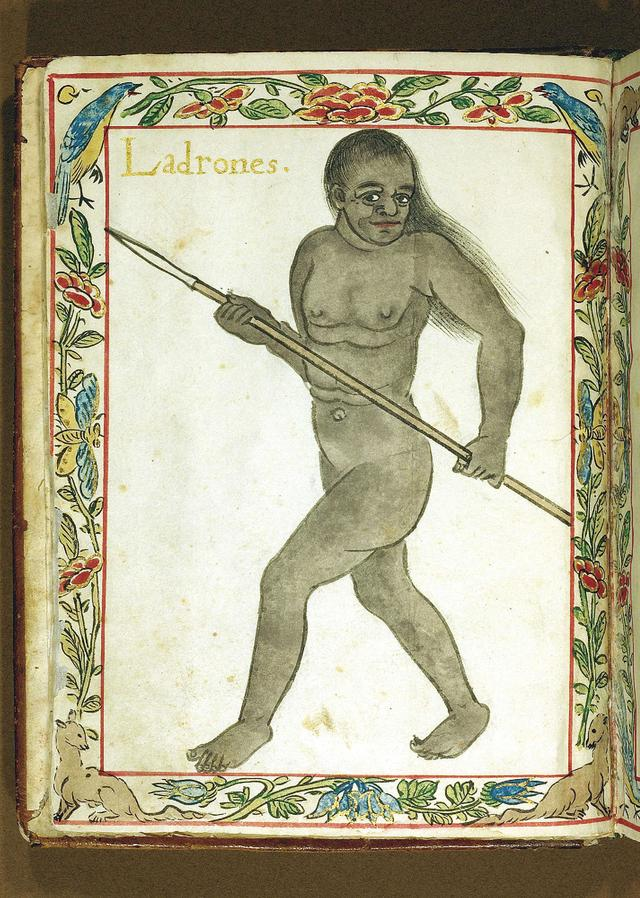
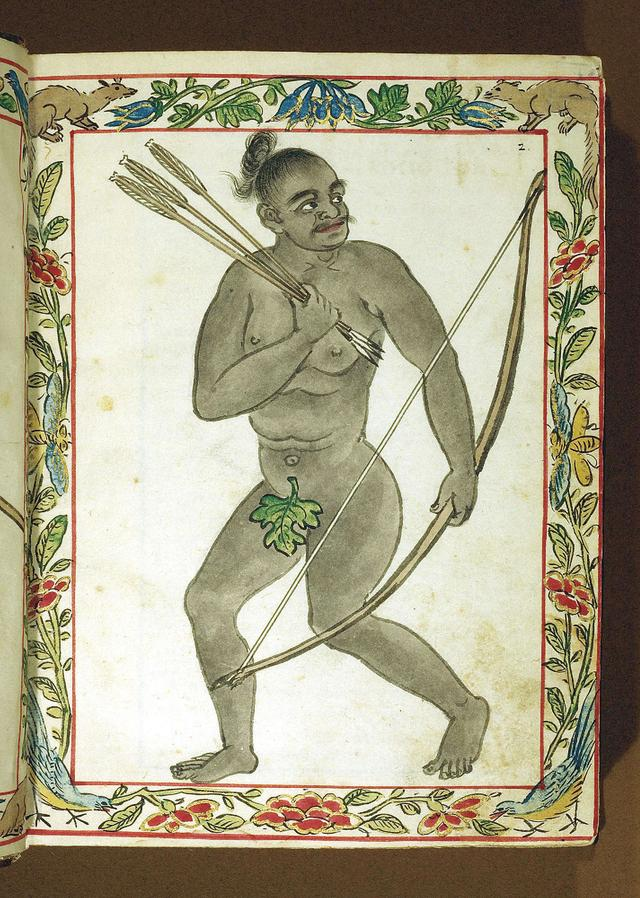
Chamorro hunters, Boxer Codex (c. 1590)

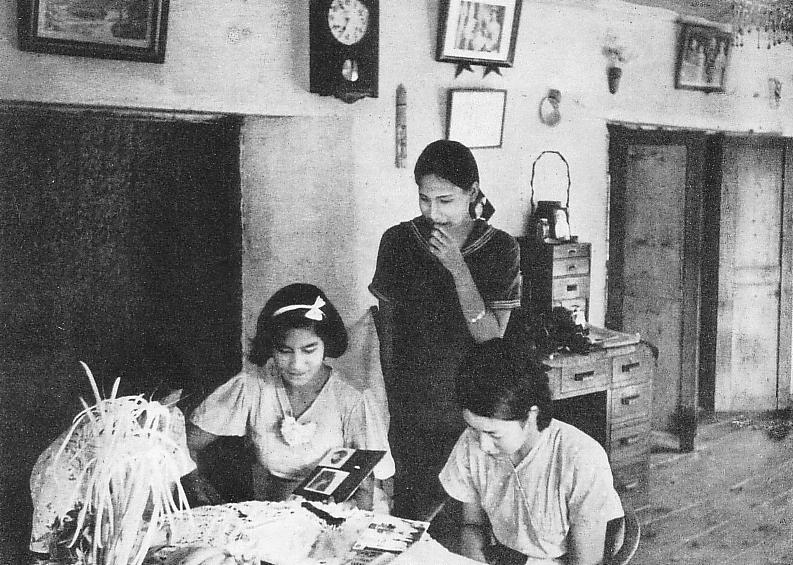
Chamorro girls in the 1930s

On March 6, 1521, Ferdinand Magellan and his men, after having crossed the Pacific Ocean, had encountered the first "Indios" since leaving South America. Later Spanish visitors named the inhabitants "Chamurres", derived from a local term for the upper caste; this was then converted to "Chamorros", an old Spanish term for "bald", perhaps in reference to the local habit to shave.

Over the centuries, the Mariana Islands have been occupied by several foreign countries (Spain, Germany, Japan, United States), and present-day Chamorro society is almost entirely multiethnic, with the inhabitants of Luta/Rota being the least so. The Chamorros are primarily of Austronesian ancestry, but began to significantly interact with Spanish and Filipinos during the Spanish colonial era (1521–1898 AD). Primarily since the late 19th century onward, many Chamorros have intermarried with other Pacific Islanders, mainland Americans, Filipinos, Chinese, and Japanese.

During the Spanish era, the Spaniards focused their efforts on converting the Native people to Catholicism. Father Frances X. Hezel stated that Chamorros caught or reported engaging in pagan "sorcery" were publicly punished. Through this, they were given Spanish surnames through Catálogo Alfabético de Apellidos or Alphabetic Catalog of Surnames.

During the Spanish–American War, the United States captured Guam on June 21, 1898. Under the Treaty of Paris, signed on December 10, 1898, Spain ceded Guam to the United States effective April 11, 1899. Guam is among the 17 nonself-governing territories listed by the United Nations.

=== World War II ===
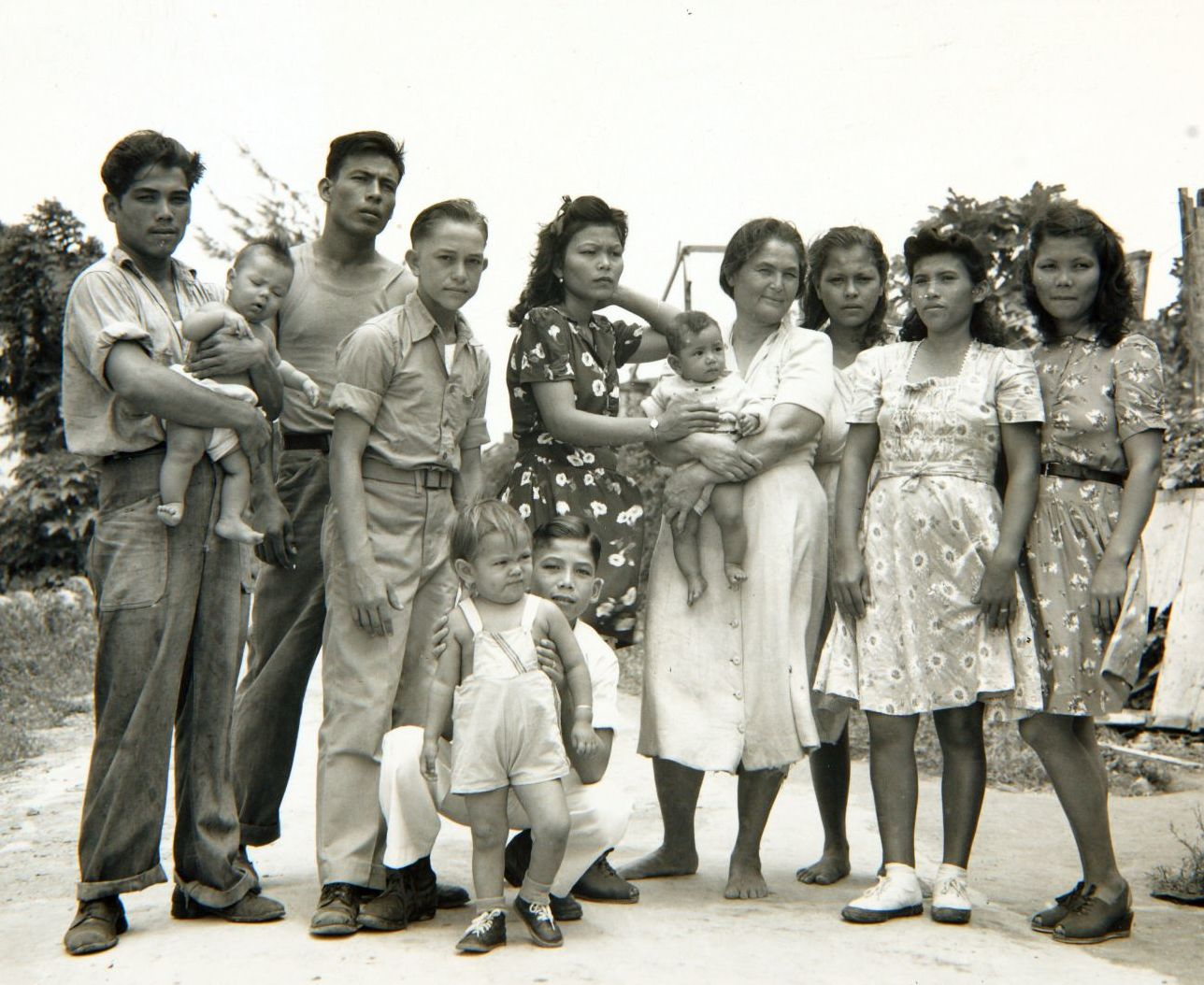
Group of Chamorros on Guam in the mid-1940s

Before World War II, five American jurisdictions were in the Pacific Ocean: Guam and Wake Island in Micronesia, American Samoa and Hawaii in Polynesia, and the Philippines in Southeast Asia. On December 8, 1941, hours after the attack on Pearl Harbor, Japanese forces from the Marianas launched an invasion of Guam. Chamorros from the Northern Marianas, who had been under Japanese rule for more than 20 years, were brought to Guam to assist the Japanese administration. This, combined with the harsh treatment of Chamorros during the two-and-a-half-year occupation, created a rift that would become the main reason Chamorros rejected the referendum on reunification approved by the Northern Marianas in the 1960s. During the occupation, Chamorros were subjected to forced labor, incarceration, torture, and execution. American forces recaptured the island on July 21, 1944; Liberation Day commemorates the victory.

After World War II, the Guam Organic Act of 1950 established Guam as an unincorporated organized territory of the United States, provided for the structure of the island's civilian government, and granted the people U.S. citizenship. The governor of Guam was federally appointed until 1968 when the Guam Elective Governor Act provided for the office's popular election. Since Guam is not a U.S. state, U.S. citizens residing in Guam are not allowed to vote for president and their congressional representative is a nonvoting member. They do, however, get to vote for party delegates in presidential primaries.

The increasing numbers of Chamorros, especially Chamorro youth, relocating to the U.S. mainland, has complicated both the definition and preservation of Chamorro identity. On Guam, a Chamorro rights movement has developed since the United States gained control of the island. Leaders of the movement seek to return ancestral lands to the Chamorro people, and attain self-determination.

== Modern Chamorro culture ==
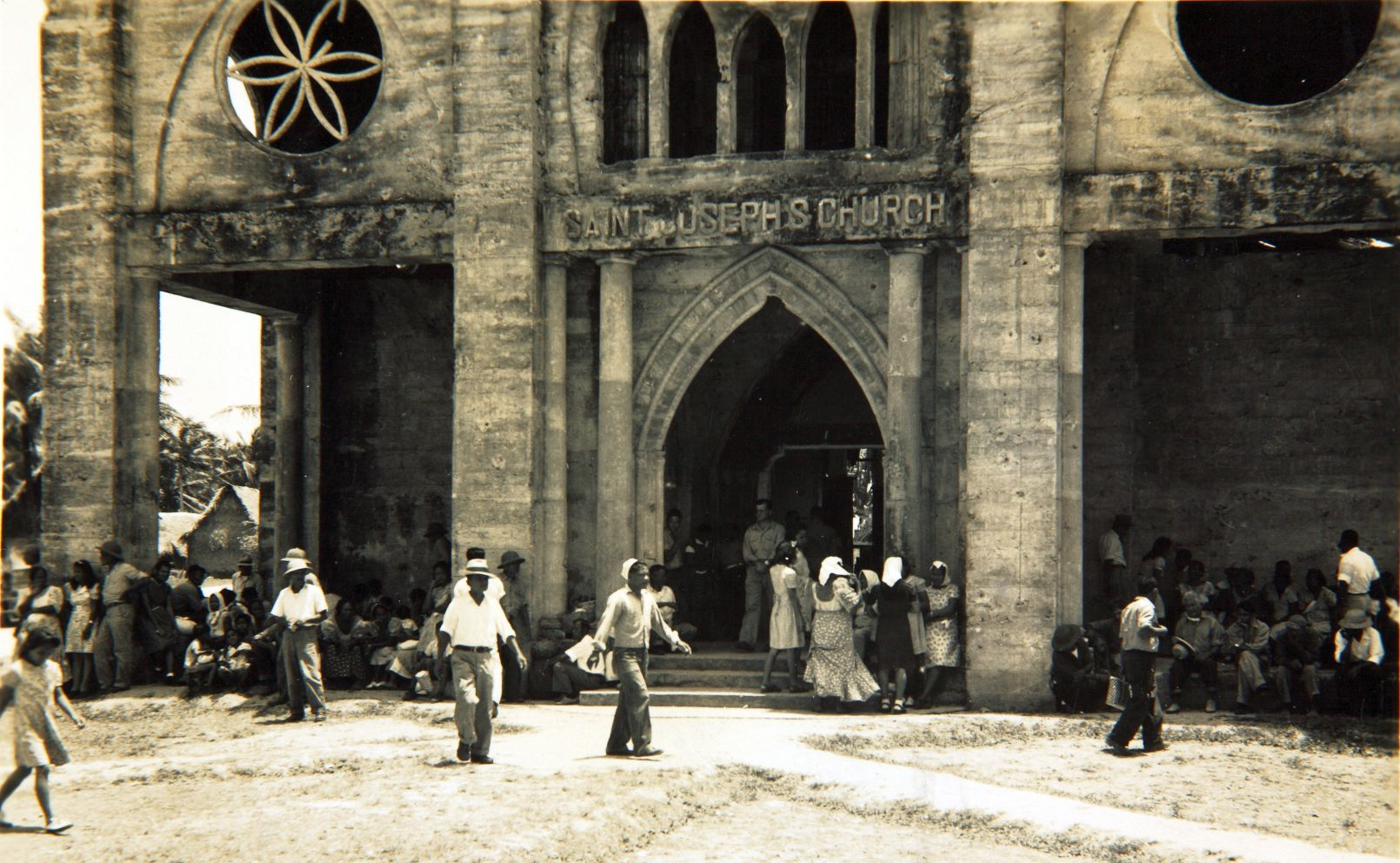
Chamorros at church in Inarajan, Guam in the mid-1940s

Chamorro culture has over the years acquired noticeable influences from Spanish, Mexican, American, Japanese, and Filipino cultures, as well as the presence of fellow Oceanic (mostly Micronesian) groups. Influence from the German era in the Northern Marianas is most visible in the form of certain given names and family surnames.

The prehistoric concept of inafa'maolek ("doing good for each other", often translated as interdependence) is a core value of traditional Chamorro culture. Respect for one's family, community, and the elderly (man åmko') are major components, although this varies from person to person and family to family. The culture is now strongly influenced by American customs and values, largely because the Marianas archipelago (partitioned into Guam and the CNMI) is currently possessed by the United States of America, as organized but unincorporated territories; in addition, most people of Chamorro descent now live outside of the Marianas in the United States. The American military has a major cultural influence among the Chamorro; enlistment rates are higher in the Marianas than in any other place in the US. On Guam, the enlistment rate is around 14 people per 10,000; by contrast, the US state of Montana, which has the highest per capita enlistment, has a rate near half that, with about eight people per 10,000. (See the Guam page for more details about this topic.)

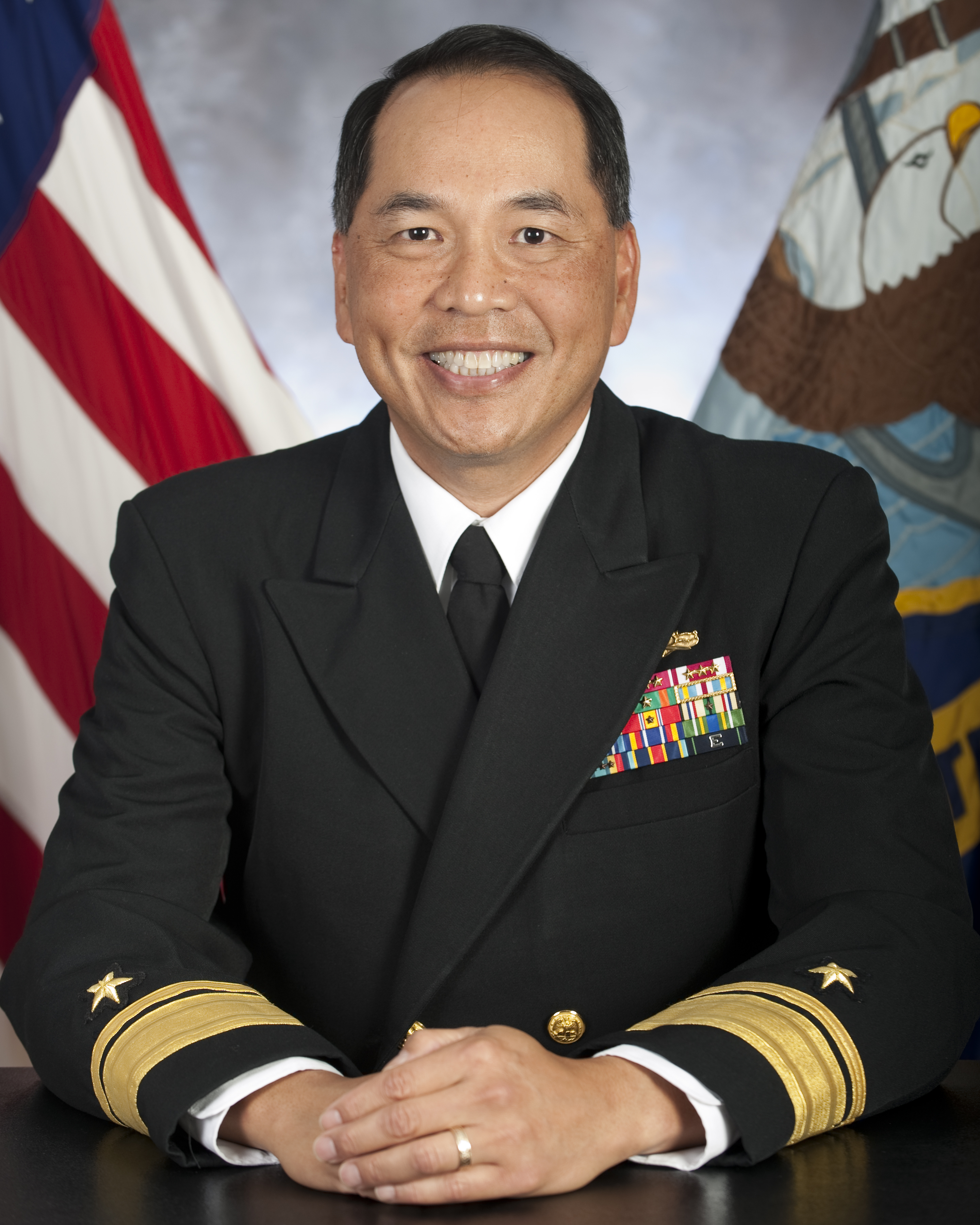
Peter Gumataotao is the first Chamorro two-star flag officer in the United States military.

Cockfighting and cockfight-related gambling were introduced by the Spanish and have long been a significant pastime in CHamoru culture, especially among men. It is still popular among the members of older generations and with Filipino immigrants, who raise roosters for cockfighting purposes; however, mixed martial arts fighting competitions have grown in popularity as spectator sports, particularly among the members of more recent generations. Large-scale events are held throughout the year on Guam and Saipan, which feature local competitors and guest participants from abroad.

Chamorro life has long centered on one's matriarchal clan. The concept of a "clan" stemming from a common female ancestor is still observed. Large extended families remain central to life in the Marianas.

Diabetes and heart disease have become increasingly common among the Indigenous population, as well as among non-Indigenous Oceanic people living in the Marianas, particularly the Carolinian Refaluwasch.

Traditional healers called suruhånu (or suruhåna for women) are still greatly respected for their knowledge of herbal treatments and spirits.

=== Religion ===
Most Chamorros are Roman Catholic and few in the Marianas still maintain some customs and beliefs from the time before the first European conquests; some residents of the Marianas will still ask permission from ancestral spirits before entering parts of jungles.

Among the 56 states and territories of the United States, the Mariana Islands have the highest rate of religious self-identification, with a combined percentage of only 1.75% of the population (Guam at 2.5% and the CNMI at just 1%) not claiming membership in or affiliation with a particular religion.

=== Dance ===
The CHamoru dance is accountable for many cultural practices, such as chant, dance, and storytelling. Across the United States, many states are introduced to a Guma, led by Chamorro dance instructors who have been in historical Guam dance groups.

Chamorro dance costumes were traditionally woven and crafted. The women wore traditional mestizas dresses and men wore a sadí made from cotton or linen.

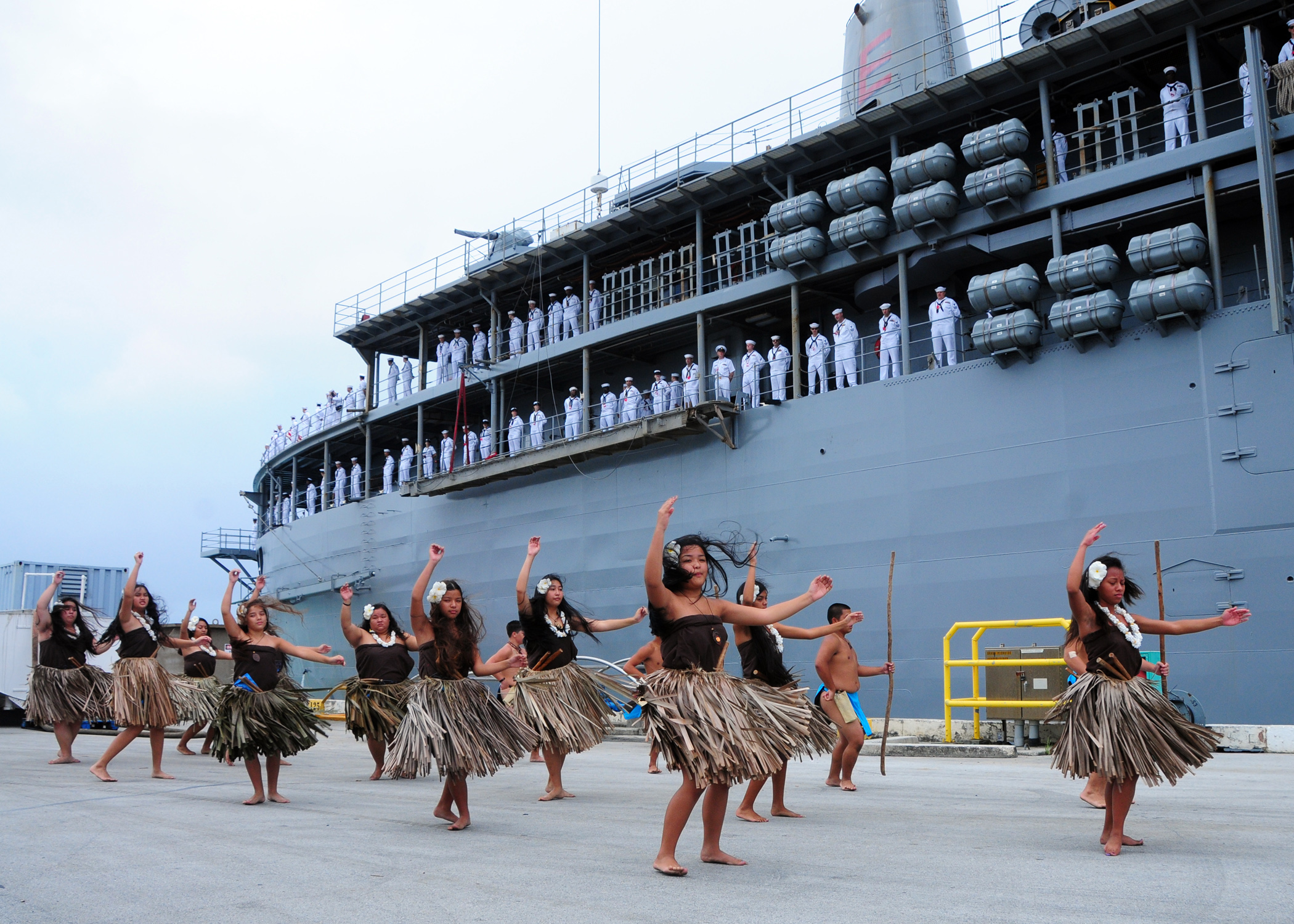
Chamorro dancers in 2012

A significant dance move is traditionally shaped by a canoe. The Chamorro people practiced the canoe by, galaidé, of the hand movement or using traditional wooden sticks. During the ancient times, outrigger canoes were used during the war, fishing, and sailing era.

=== Cuisine ===
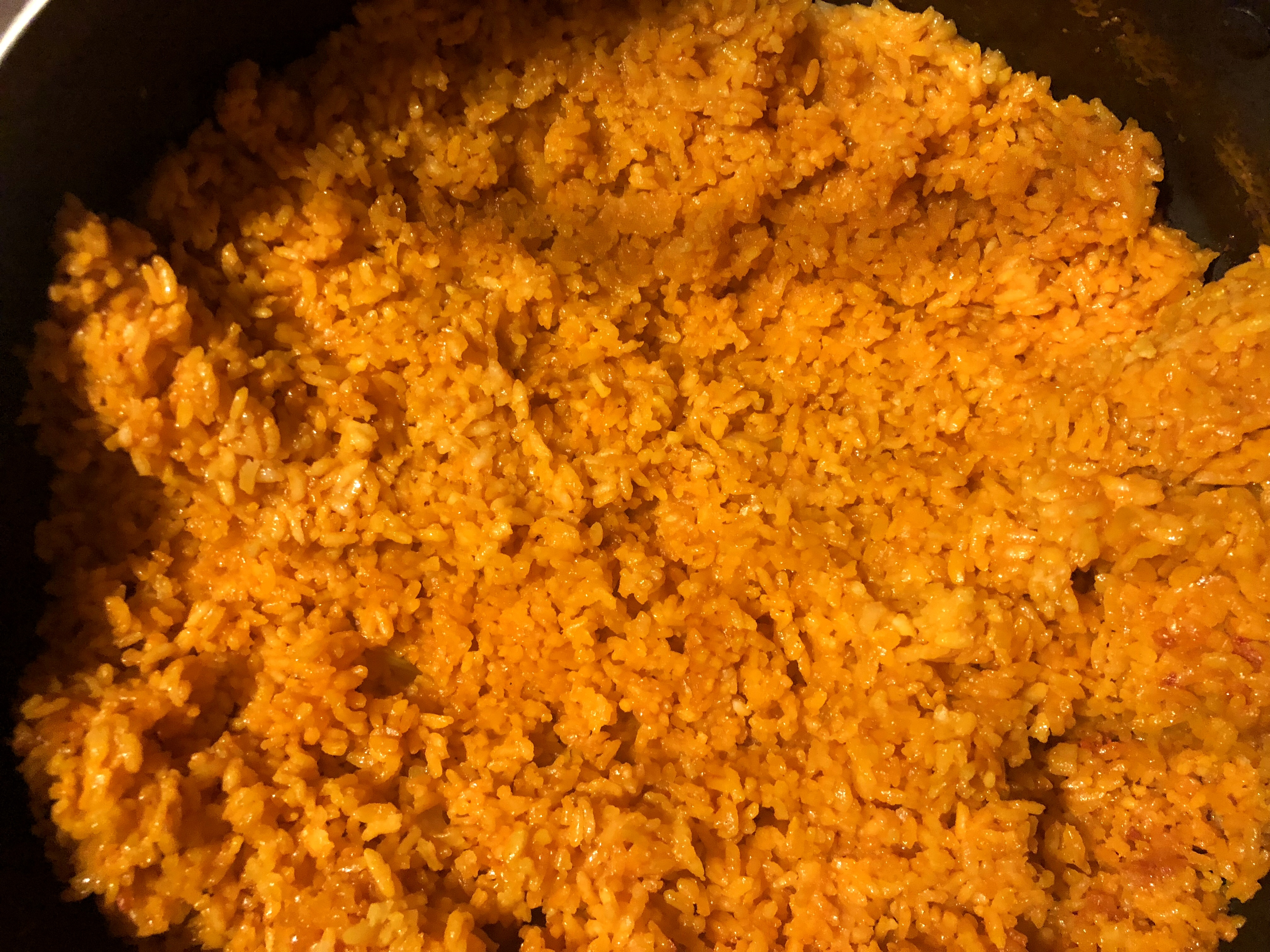
Chamorro red rice

Chamorro cuisine is influenced by various cultures. Examples of popular foods of foreign origin include various types of sweet or savory empanada, originally introduced by Spain, and pancit, a noodle dish from the Philippines. The Spanish settlement in the 17th century also introduced cattle, leading to dishes like tinala' katne.

Archeological evidence from islands in the Marianas reveals that rice was cultivated there since prehistory. Red rice made with achoti is a distinct staple food that strongly identifies Chamorro cuisine among the many dishes of fellow Pacific Island cultures. It is commonly served for special events, such as parties (gupot or "fiestas"), nobenas, and occasions such as a high-school or college graduations. The condiment fina'denne' accompanies most meals. Fruits such as lemmai, mangga, niyok, and bilimbines are consumed in various local recipes. In the Marianas, Korean, Chinese, Japanese, and American cuisine are also commonly available. Local cookies are known as guyuria.

Locally distinct foods include kelaguen, a dish in which meat is denatured in whole or in part by citric acid rather than heat; tinaktak, a meat dish made with coconut milk; and kå'du fanihi (flying fox/fruit bat soup). Fruit bats and local birds have become scarce in modern times primarily due to the World War II-era introduction of the brown tree snake, which decimated the populations of local birds and threatens the fanihi (fruit bat) population, as well. Illegal hunting of fruit bats also threatens existing populations.

Spam and other canned meats were introduced to the islands after World War II, leading to a dietary shift.

== Diaspora in the United States ==
According to the 2020 census, there are roughly 168,226 Chamorros living in the United States (alone or in combination), of whom 81,287 identify as Chamorro alone (i.e. with no additional racial or ethnic identity).

The early Chamorros who migrated to the US were Guamanians who moved in the first decade of the 20th century. In the following decades, small groups of Guamanians emigrated to Hawaii and the Western United States, where they worked as farmers. The population of Guam gained American citizenship in 1929. During the 1930s the military induction of young CHamoru men into the US Navy led to the first wave of CHamoru military families leaving Guam in the 1940s after WWII. After the end of World War II, many more Guamanians emigrated to the US. Most of them were in the military or married to military personnel.

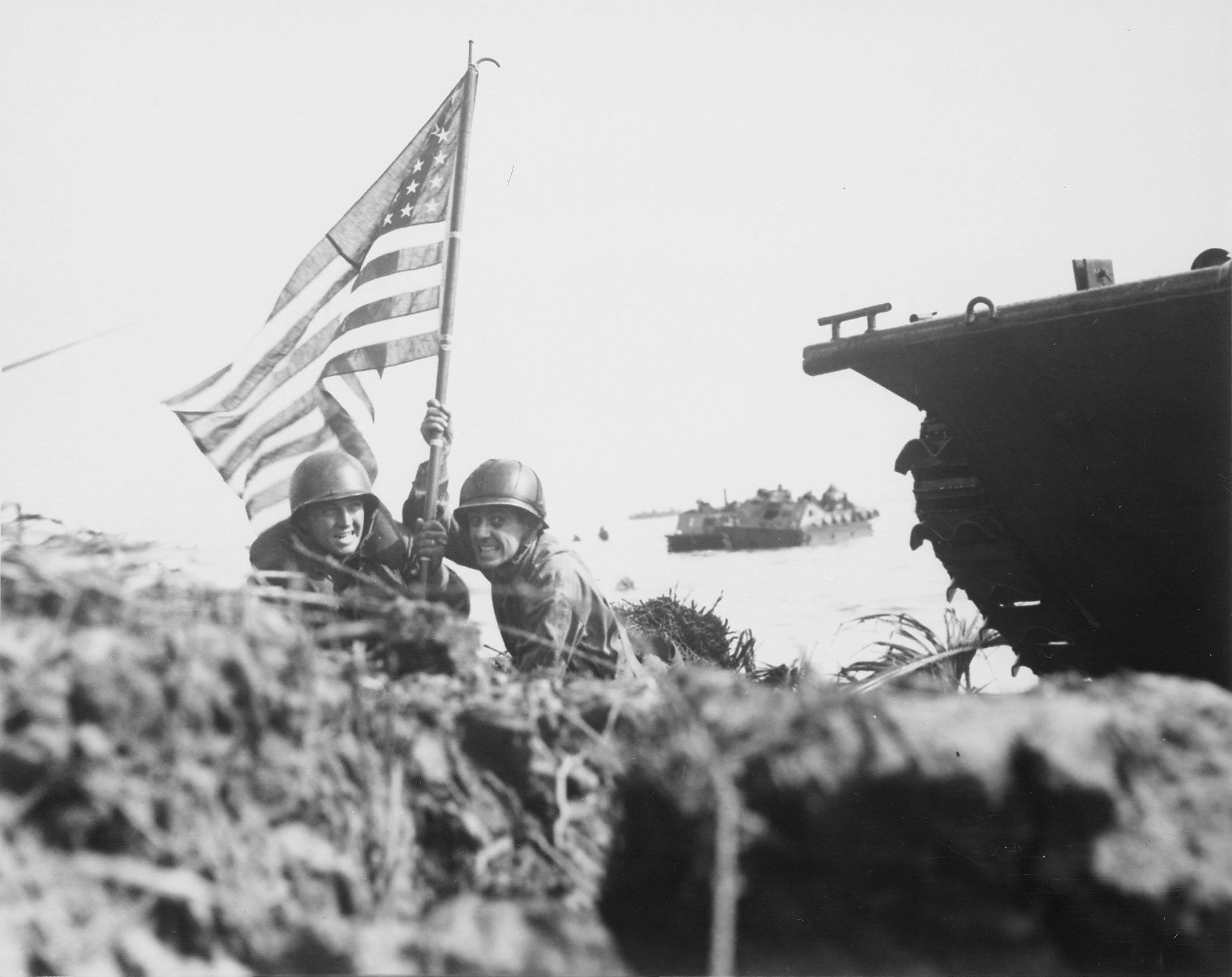
Guam gained full American Citizenship, 1950

In 1950, the population of Guam gained the full American citizenship, which favored Guamanian migration to the US. The first major Guamanian migration emerged and more than 160 Guamanians emigrated to the US in the 1950s. Many of them moved to California. In 1952, Guamanian immigrants founded their first organization in US, the Guam Territorial Society (later renamed as the Guam Society of America), in Washington, D.C., where many worked for the Department of Defense and developing military operations.

In the 1960s, hundreds of Guamanians migrated to the United States. Most of them were fleeing the Korean War and Typhoon Karen.

In the 1970s, another wave of Guamanians arrived in the US. In 1986, the US acquired the Northern Mariana Islands, which favoured migration from islands to the US.

San Diego County, California, has the largest Chamorro population with 9,391 persons or 0.24% of the total population.

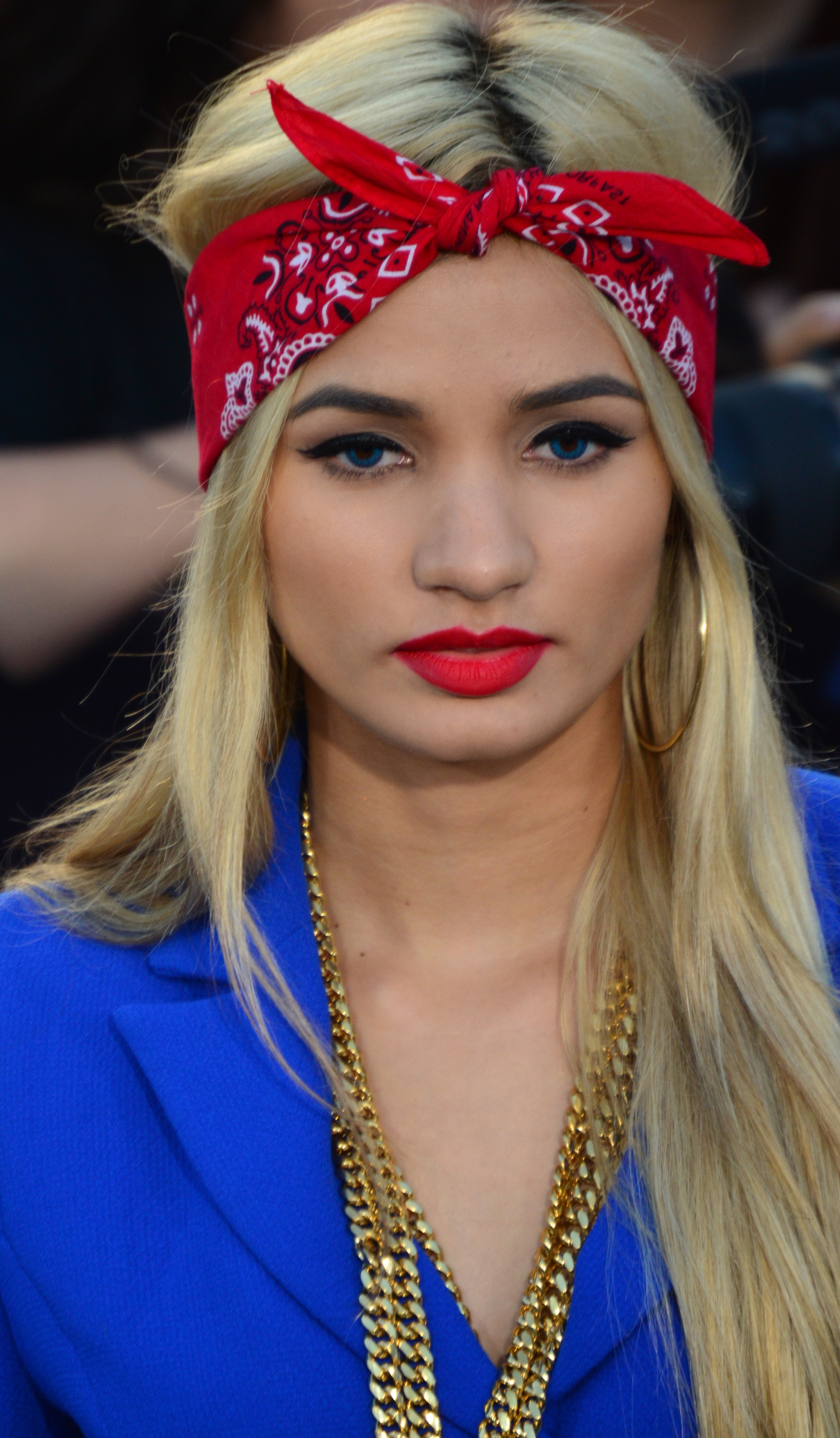
Pop singer Pia Mia is of mixed Chamorro ancestry

== Notable Chamorros ==
- Pia Mia Perez (born 1996), singer-songwriter
- Angel Santos (born 1959), Chamorro rights advocate and former Guam Senator
- Craig Santos Perez (born 1980), award-winning poet, essayist, and former university professor
- Theresa H. Arriola, cultural anthropologist from the Northern Mariana Islands
- Zach Banner (born 1993), former American NFL football offensive tackle for the Pittsburgh Steelers
- Ignacia Bordallo Butler (died 1993), businesswoman and entrepreneur
- Manny Crisostomo (born 1958), Chamorro Pulitzer Prize winner
- Joe Duarte (born 1983), mixed martial artist
- Peter Gumataotao, first Chamorro two-star flag officer in the United States military
- Laila Ireland, LGBTQ rights activist and retired U.S. Army corporal
- Kimberlyn King-Hinds (born 1975), Delegate to the U.S. House from the Northern Mariana Islands's at-large congressional district since 2025
- Siobhon McManus, teacher and activist
- Walt Nauta, aide to US president Donald Trump
- Edward Pangelinan (1941–2023), Resident representative to the U.S. House from the Northern Mariana Islands's at-large congressional district from 1978 to 1984
- Susan Pangelinan, Chamorro-American member of the United States Air Force
- Frank Camacho, martial artist
- Maria Anderson Roberto (born 1880), chaperone for the Navy's Native Nurses program
- Gregorio Sablan (born 1955), Delegate to the U.S. House from the Northern Mariana Islands's at-large congressional district from 2009 to 2025
- Froilan Tenorio (died 2020), Speaker of the Northern Mariana Islands House of Representatives from 2010 to 2013, Governor of the Northern Mariana Islands from 1994 to 1998, Resident Representative to the U.S. House from the Northern Mariana Islands's at-large congressional district from 1984 to 1990, Member of the Northern Mariana Islands Senate from 1980 to 1984
- Jon Tuck, martial artist
- Frank Rabon (born 1954), master of Chamorro dance
- Ben Blaz (born 1928), one-star General Marine Corps base Guam (Camp Blaz Marine Corps Station) and delegate to the U.S. House from Guam's at-large congressional district from 1985 to 1993
- Juan Babauta (born 1953), Governor of the Northern Mariana Islands from 2002 to 2006; resident representative to the U.S. House from the Northern Mariana Islands's at-large congressional district from 1900 to 2002
- Antonio Borja Won Pat (died 1987), Delegate to the U.S. House from Guam's at-large congressional district from 1973 to 1985; Washington representative from Guam's at-large congressional district; Speaker of the Guam Legislature from 1951 to 1955 and 1957 to 1965

== See also ==
- History of Guam
- History of Oceania
- History of the Pacific Islands
- Guamanian citizenship and nationality
- Native Hawaiians
