= List of Japanese dishes =

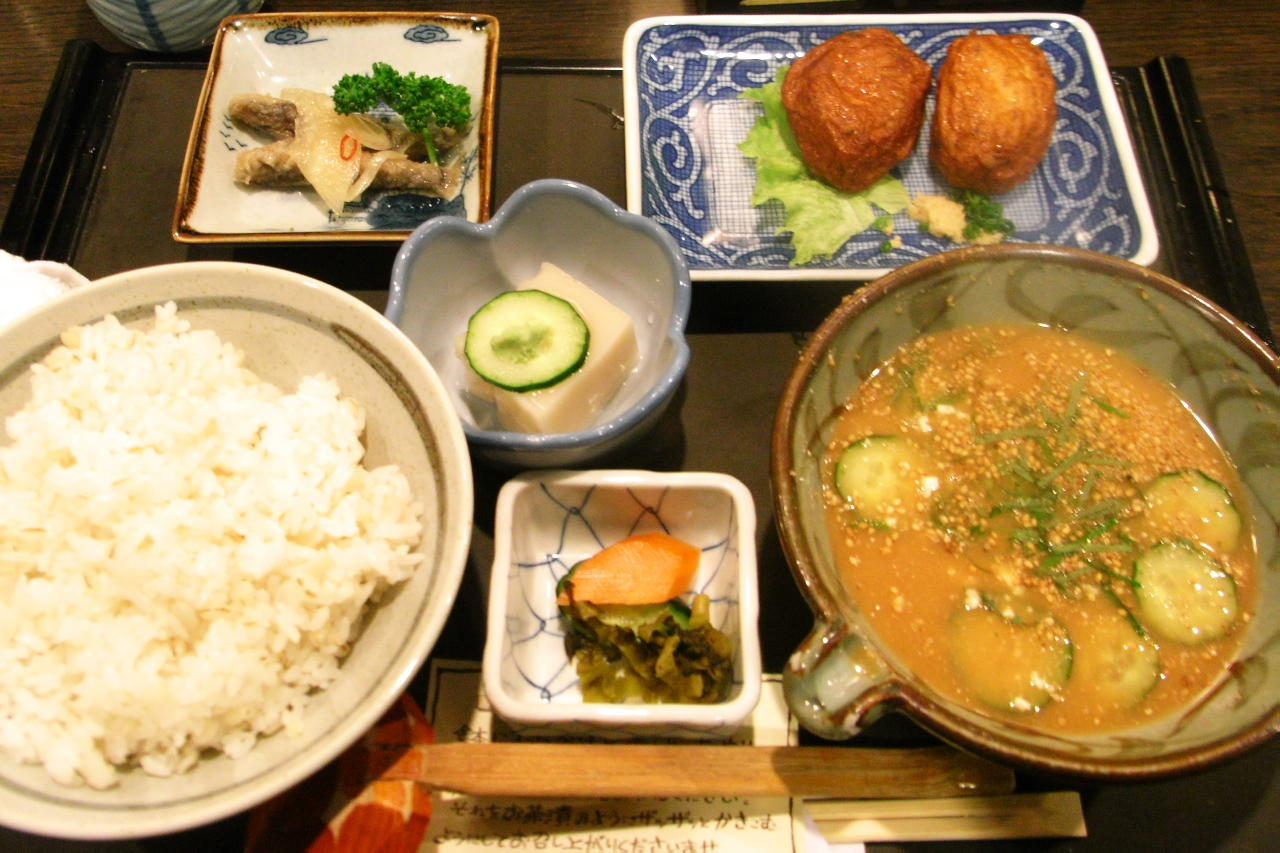
A Japanese dinner

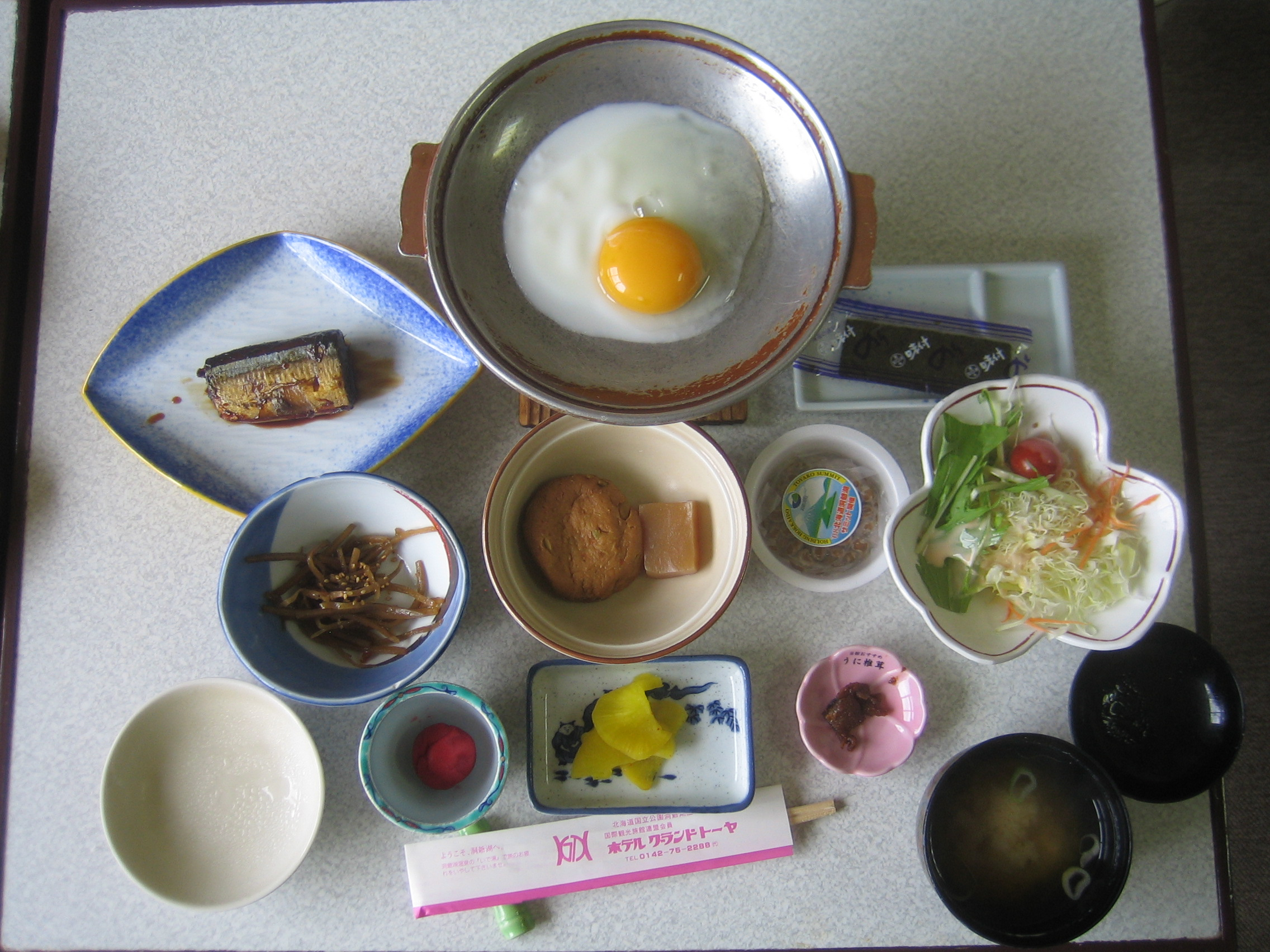
Japanese breakfast foods

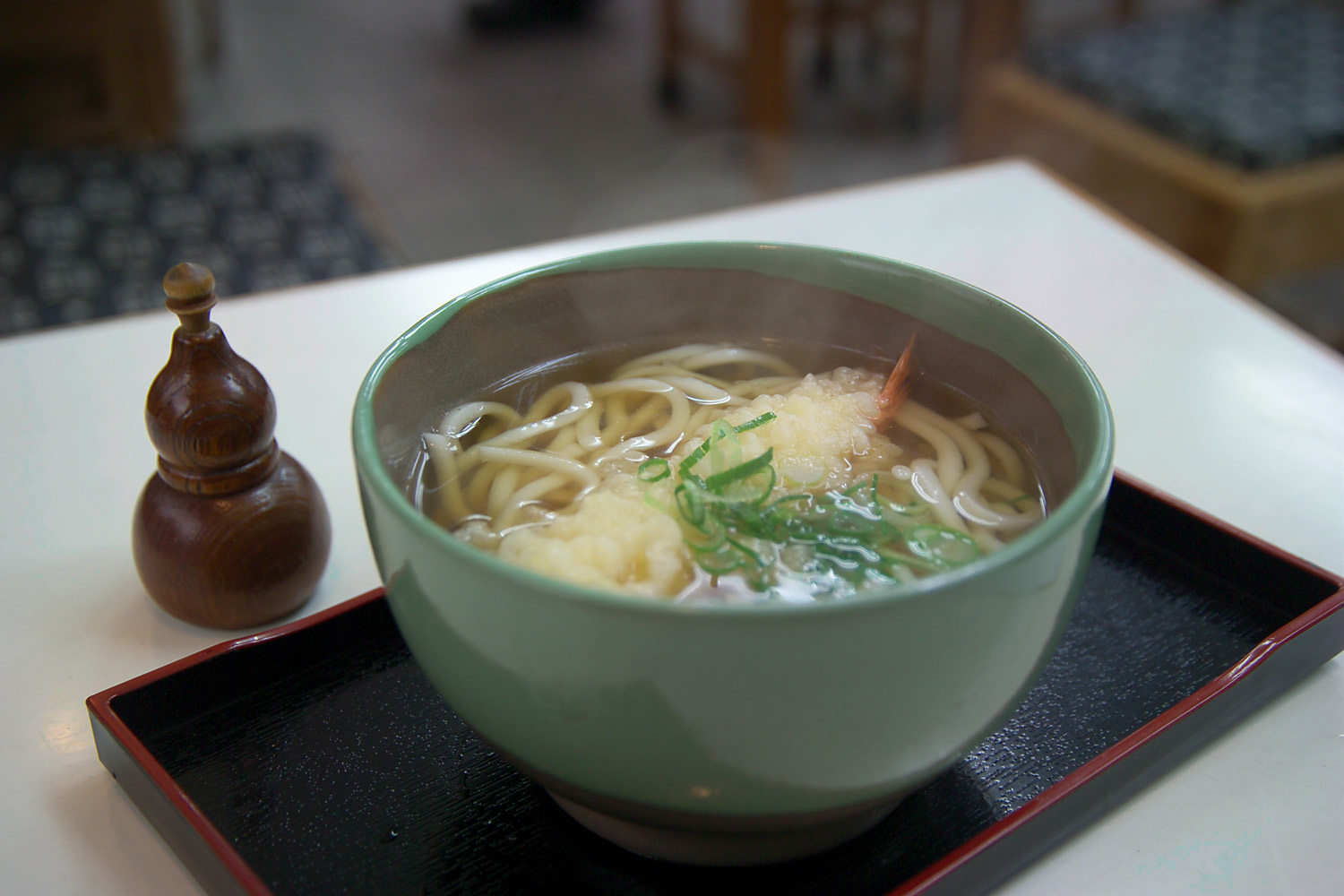
Tempura udon

Below is a list of dishes found in Japanese cuisine. Apart from rice, staples in Japanese cuisine include noodles, such as soba and udon. Japan has many simmered dishes such as fish products in broth called oden, or beef in sukiyaki and nikujaga. Foreign food, in particular Chinese food in the form of noodles in soup called ramen and fried dumplings, gyoza, and other food such as curry and hamburger steaks are commonly found in Japan. Historically, the Japanese shunned meat, but with the modernization of Japan in the 1860s, meat-based dishes such as tonkatsu became more common.

== Rice dishes (ご飯物) ==
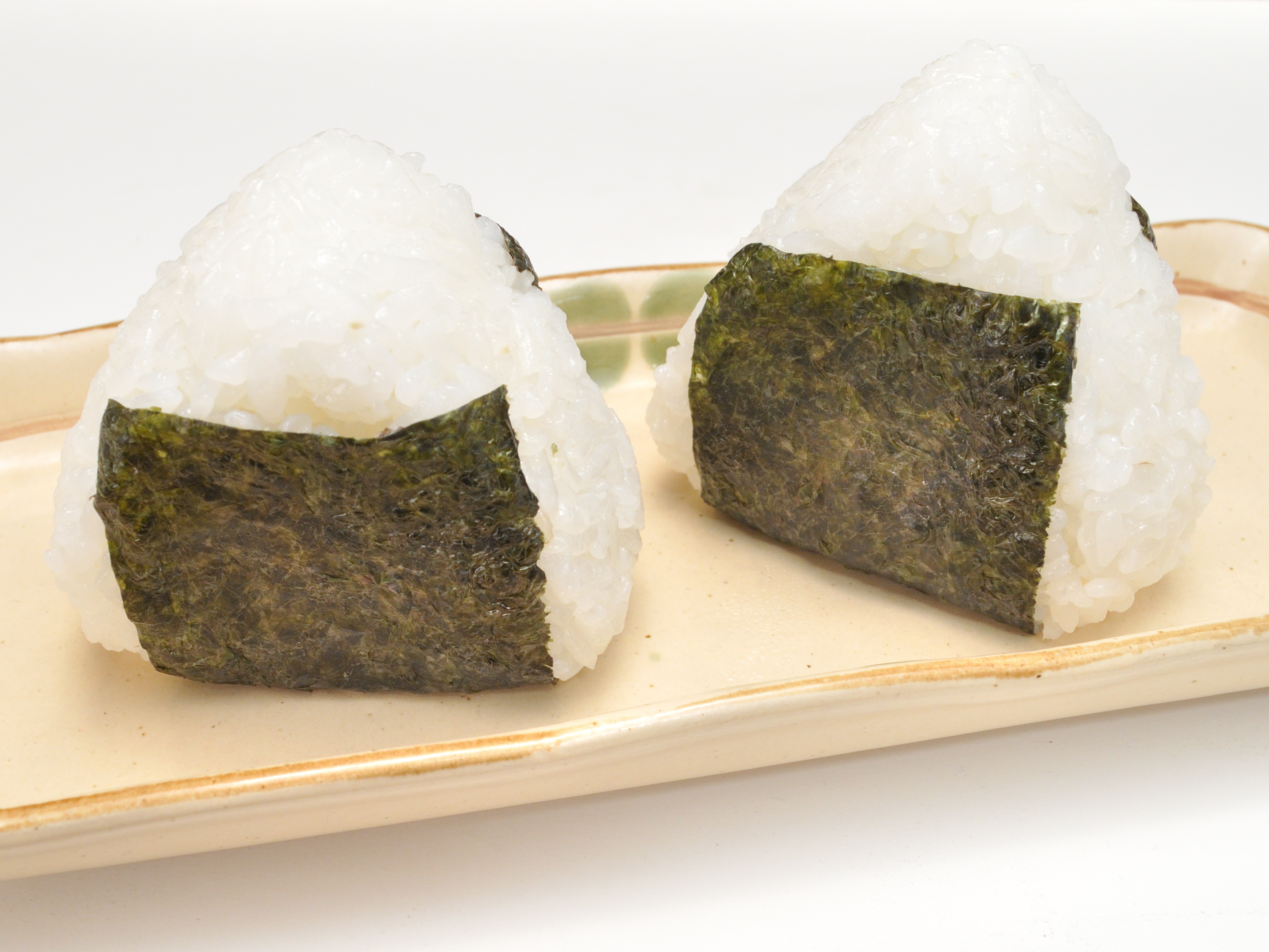
Onigiri

- Gohan or meshi: plainly cooked white rice. It is such a staple that the terms gohan and meshi are also used to refer to meals in general, such as asa gohan/meshi (朝御飯, 朝飯, breakfast), hiru gohan/meshi (昼御飯, 昼飯, lunch), and ban gohan/meshi (晩御飯, 晩飯, dinner). Also, raw rice is called kome (米, rice), while cooked rice is gohan (ご飯, [cooked] rice). Nori (海苔), and furikake (ふりかけ) are popular condiments in Japanese breakfast. Some alternatives are:
- Curry rice (karē raisu カレーライス): Introduced from the UK in the late 19th century, "curry rice" is now one of the most popular dishes in Japan. It is much milder than its Indian counterpart.
- Chāhan (炒飯) or yakimeshi (焼飯): fried rice, adapted to Japanese tastes, tends to be lighter in flavor and style than the Chinese version from which it is derived
- Genmai gohan (玄米御飯): brown rice
- Hayashi rice (ハヤシライス): thick beef stew on rice
- Kamameshi (釜飯): rice topped with vegetables and chicken or seafood, then baked in an individual-sized pot
- Katemeshi: a peasant food consisting of rice, barley, millet and chopped daikon radish
- Mochi (餅): glutinous rice cake
- Mugi gohan/Mugi meshi (麦御飯, 麦飯): white rice cooked with barley
- Ochazuke (御茶漬け): hot green tea or dashi (出汁) poured over cooked white rice, often with various savory ingredients such as umeboshi (梅干) or tsukemono (漬物).
- Okowa (おこわ): cooked glutinous rice
- Omurice (Omu-raisu, オムライス): omelet filled with fried rice, apparently originating from Tōkyō
- Onigiri (おにぎり): balls of rice with a filling in the middle.
- Sekihan (赤飯): white rice cooked with azuki beans (小豆) to glutinous rice. (literally red rice)
- Takikomi gohan (炊き込み御飯): Japanese-style pilaf cooked with various ingredients and flavored with soy, dashi, etc.
- Tamago kake gohan (卵掛け御飯): Rice with a raw egg
- Tenmusu: a rice ball wrapped with nori that is filled with deep-fried tempura shrimp
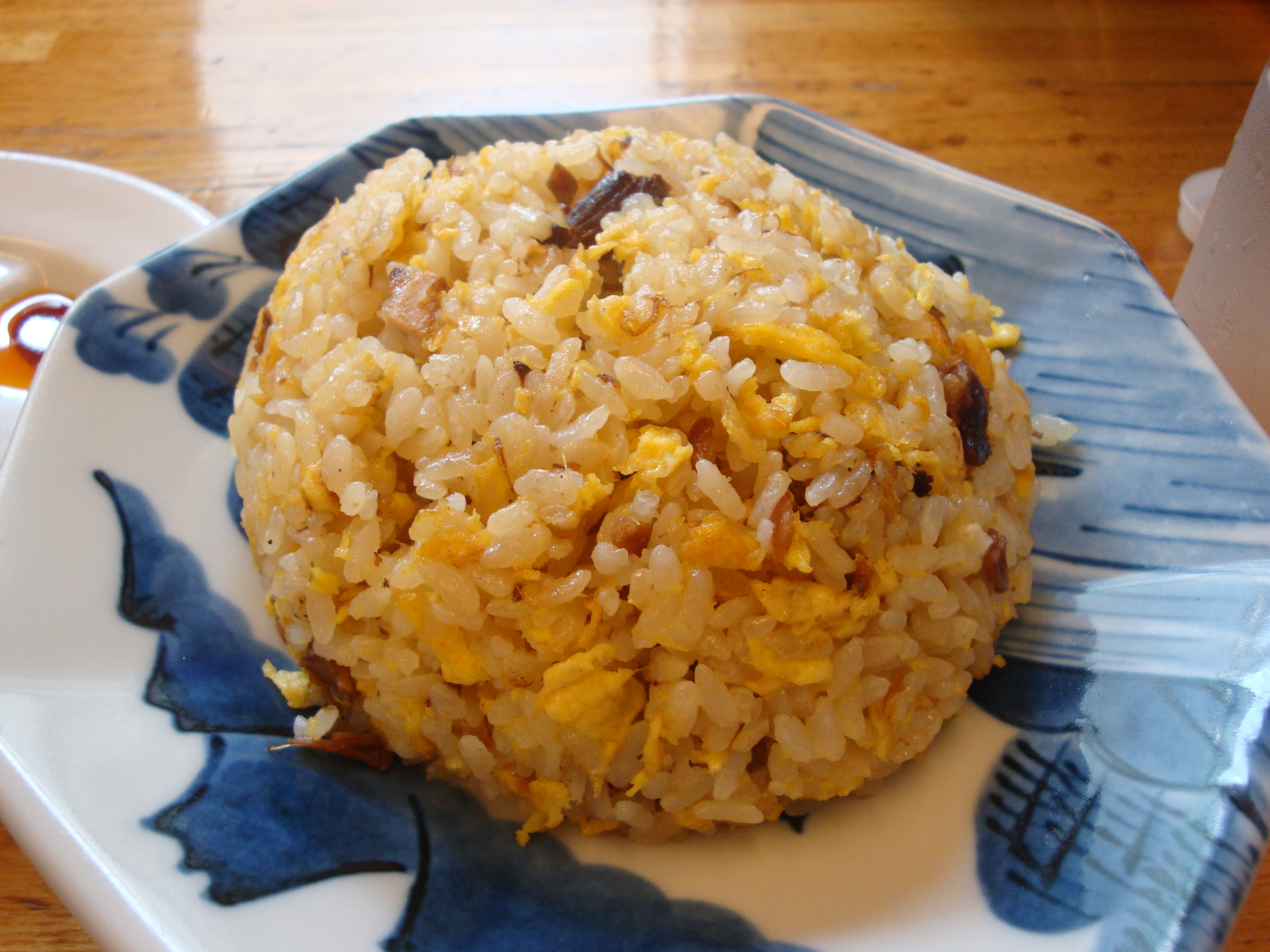
Chāhan

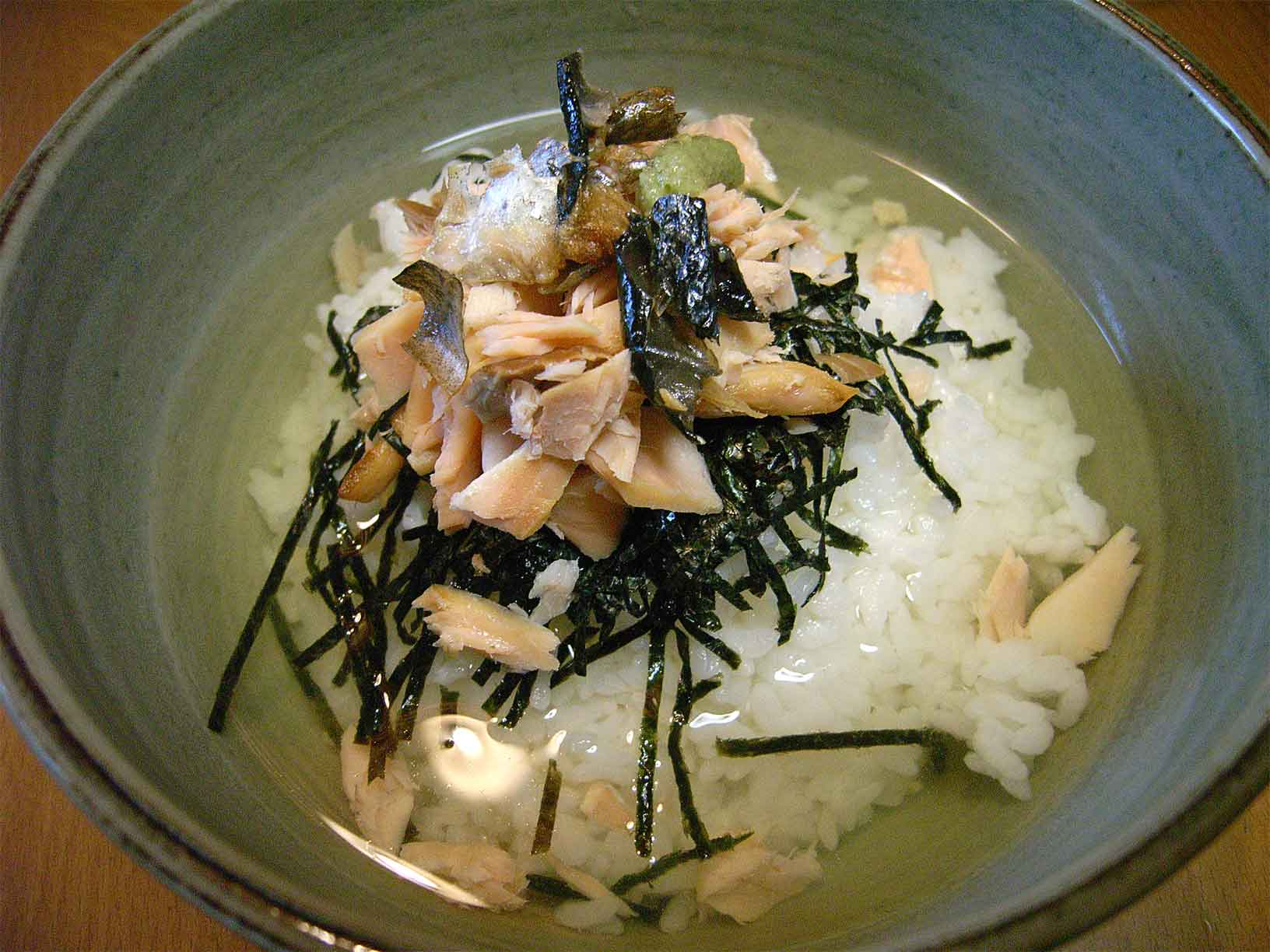
Chazuke

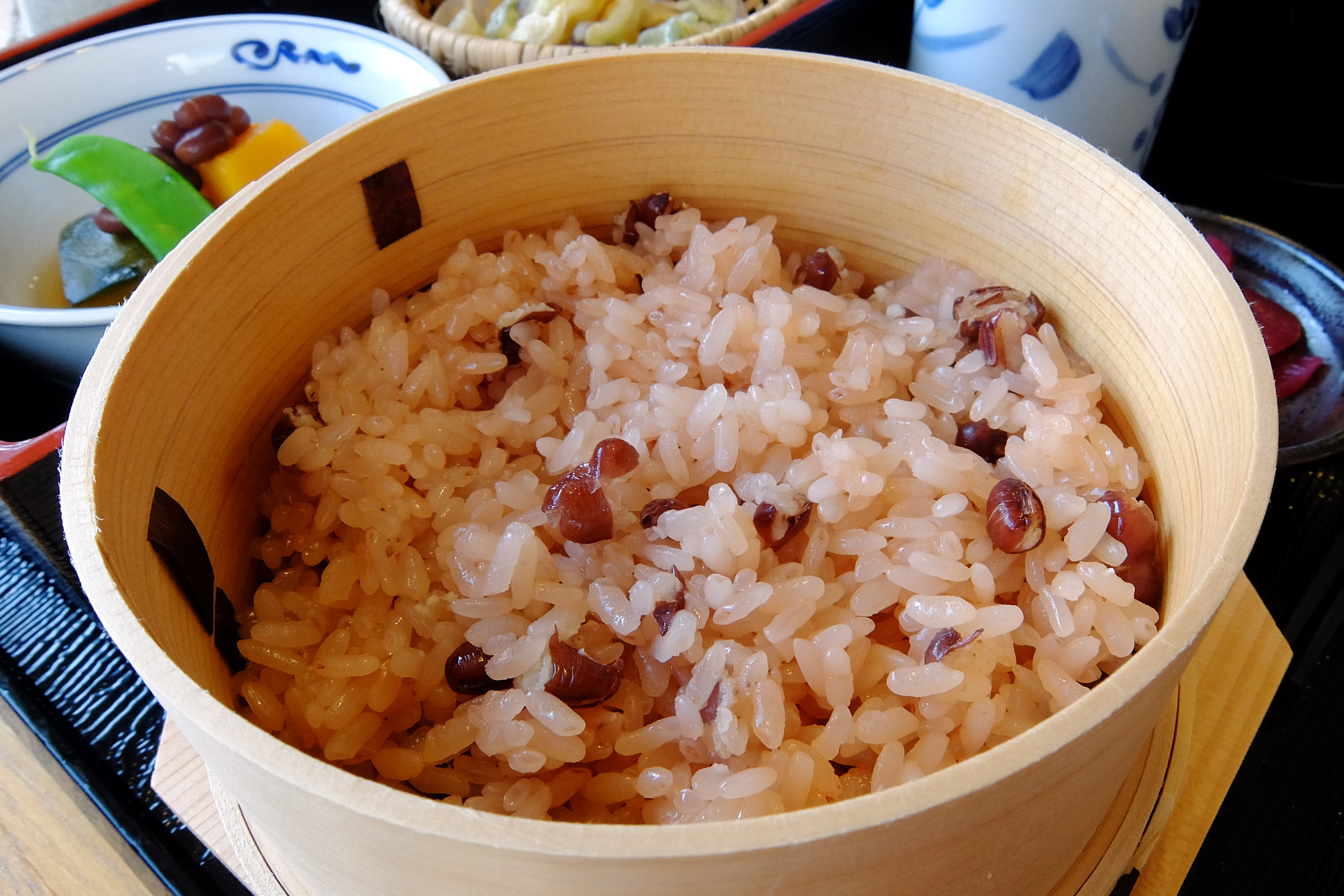
Sekihan

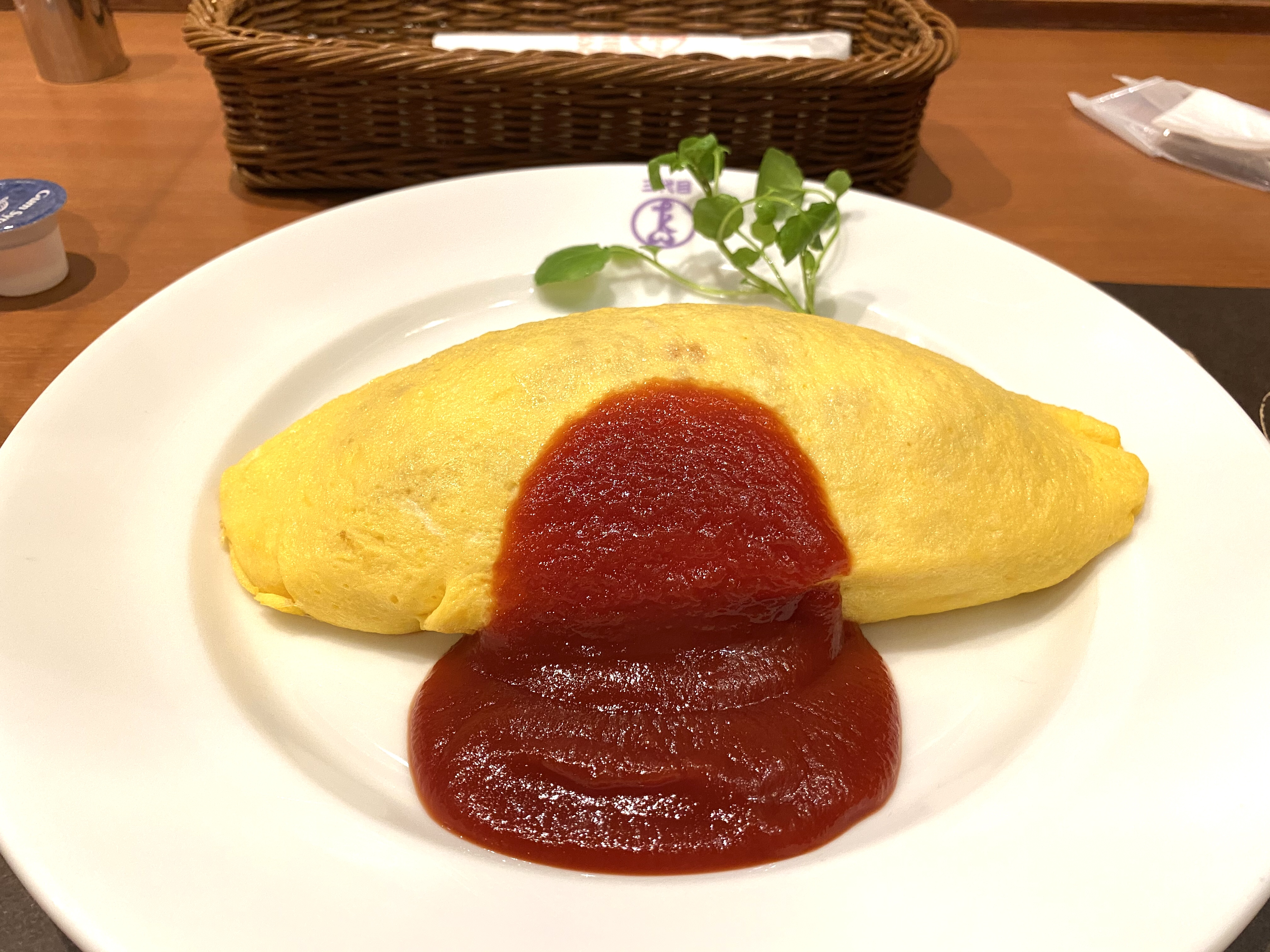
Omurice

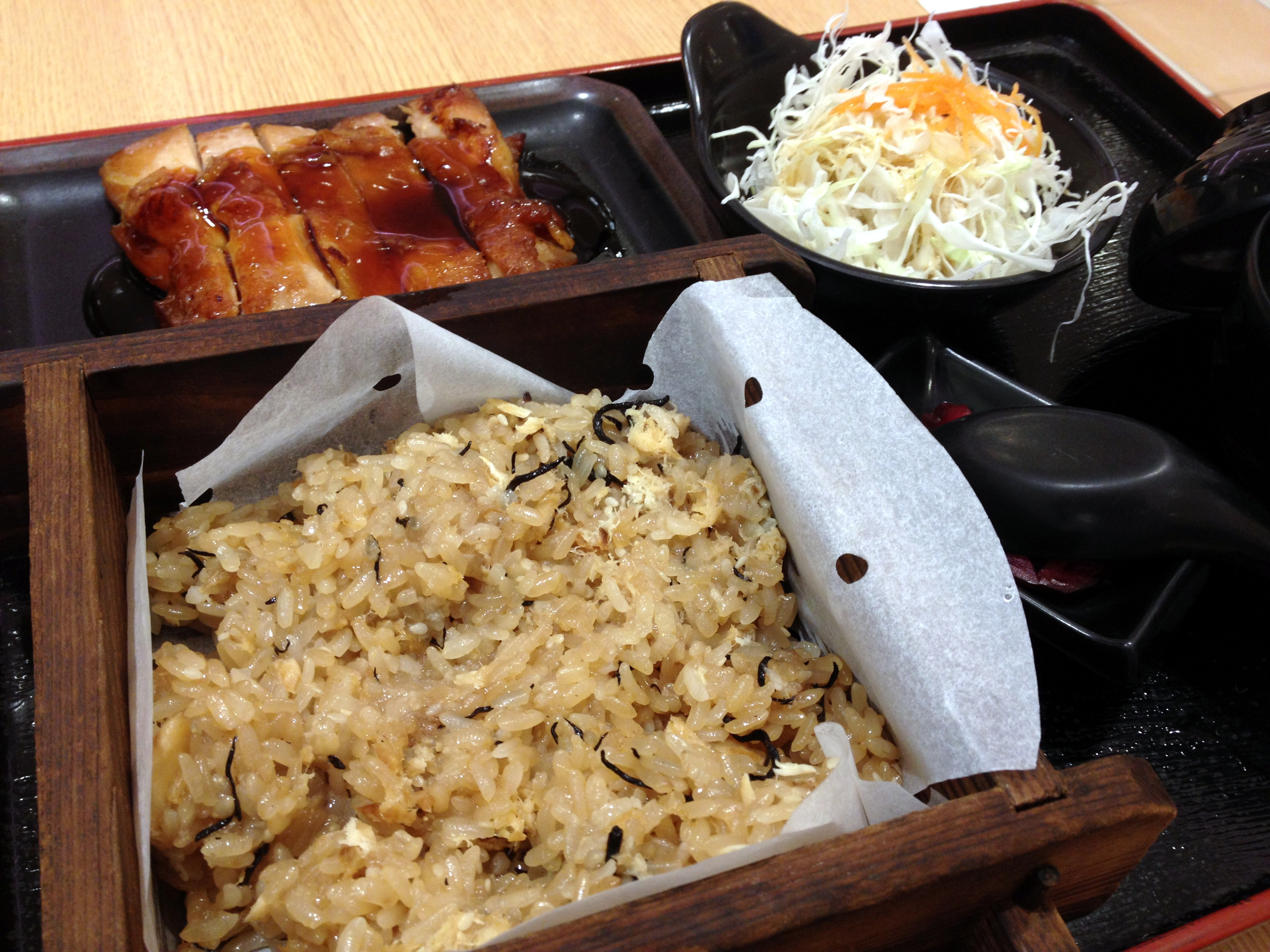
Okowa

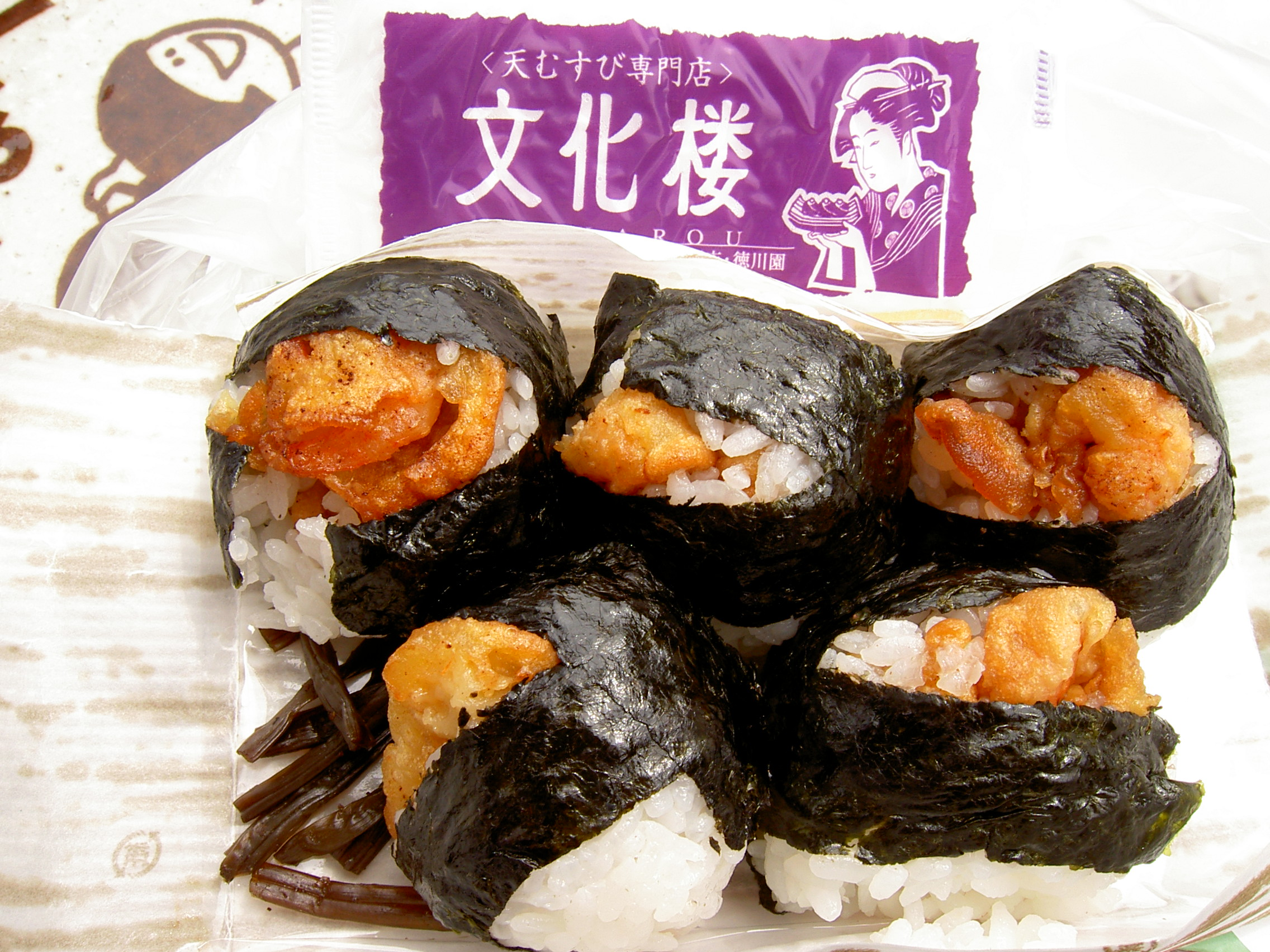
Tenmusu

=== Rice porridge (お粥) ===
- Nanakusa-gayu (七草粥) is the long-standing Japanese custom of eating seven-herb rice porridge (nanakusa-gayu) on January 7 (Jinjitsu).
- Okayu (お粥) is a rice congee (porridge), sometimes egg dropped and usually served to infants and sick people.
- Zosui (Zōsui, 雑炊) or Ojiya (おじや) is a soup containing rice stewed in stock, often with egg, meat, seafood, vegetables or mushroom, and flavored with miso or soy. Known as juushii in Okinawa. Some similarity to risotto and Kayu though Zosui uses cooked rice, as the difference is that kayu is made from raw rice.
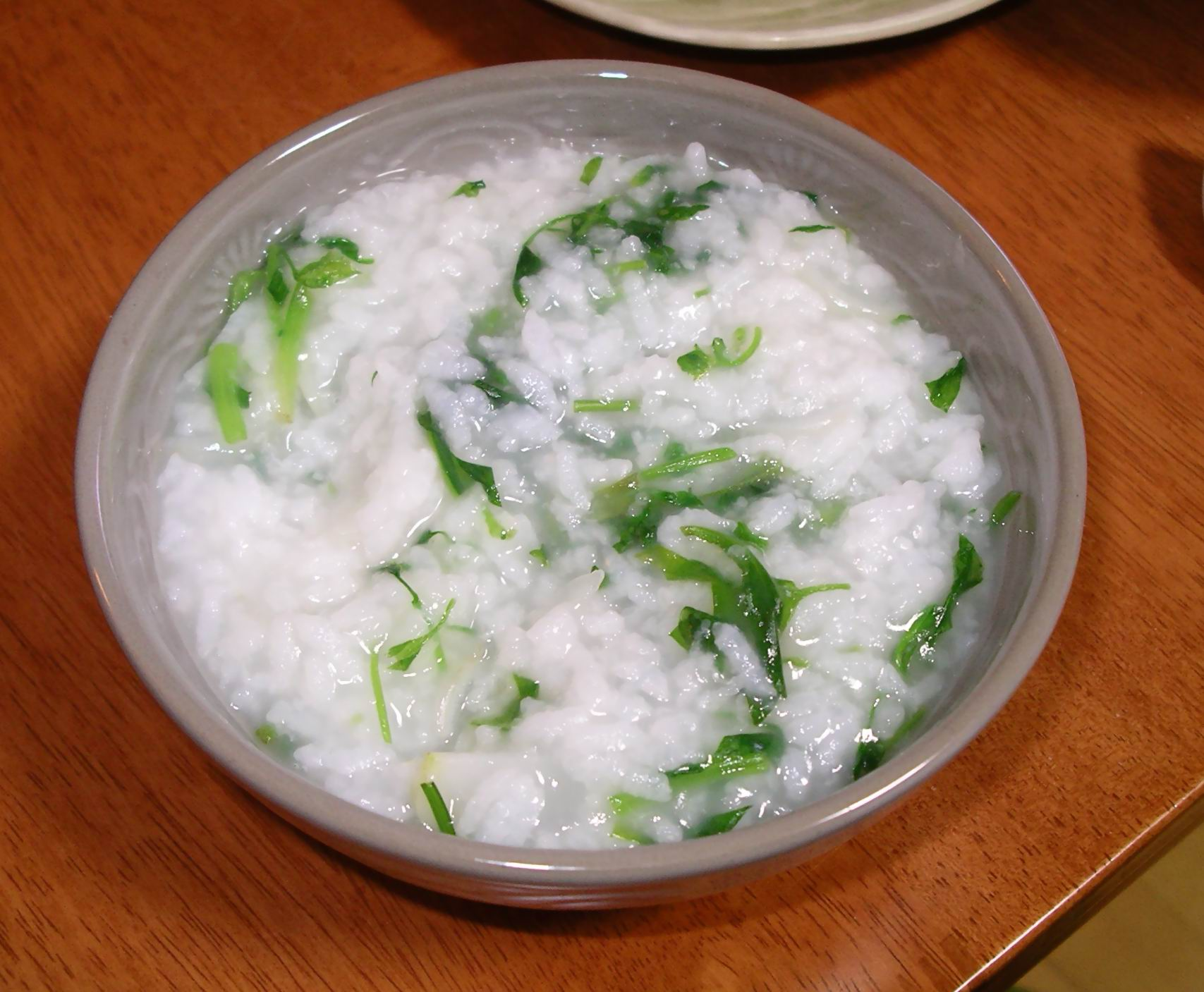
Nanakusa-gayu

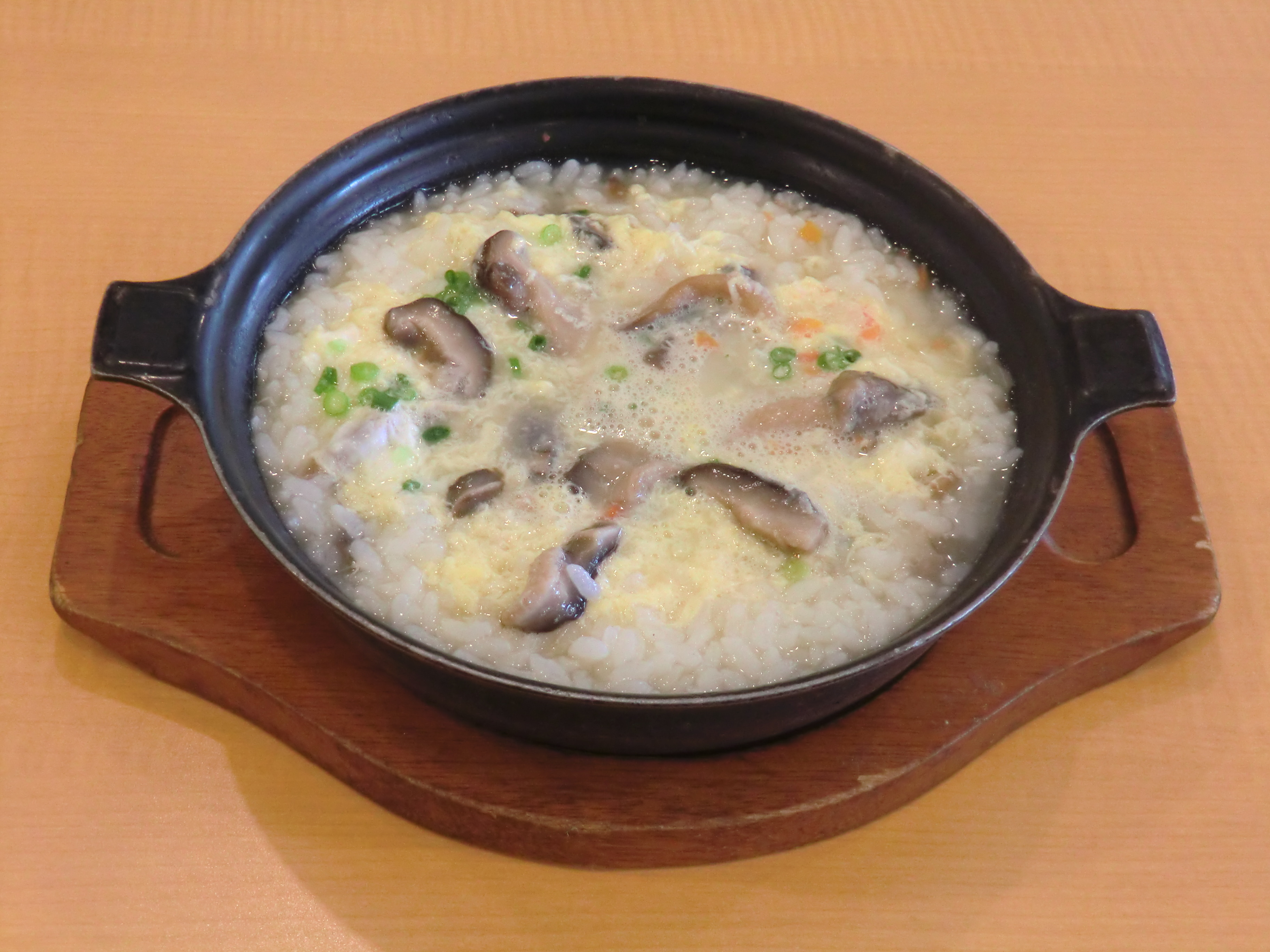
Zosui

=== Rice bowls (どんぶり) ===
A one-bowl dish, consisting of a donburi (どんぶり, 丼, big bowl) full of hot steamed rice with various savory toppings:

- Gyūdon: (牛丼, beef bowl): Donburi topped with seasoned beef and onion
- Katsudon (カツ丼): Donburi topped with deep-fried breaded cutlet of pork (tonkatsudon), chicken (chickendon)
- Oyakodon (親子丼): Donburi topped with chicken and egg (or sometimes salmon and salmon roe) (literally Parent and Child bowl)
- Tekkadon (鉄火丼): Donburi topped with tuna sashimi
- Tendon: (天丼): Donburi topped with tempura (battered shrimp and vegetables)
- Unadon: (うな丼, 鰻丼): Donburi topped with broiled eel with vegetables
- Wappameshi: (わっぱ飯): rice topped with other ingredients, cooked in wooden containers called wappa
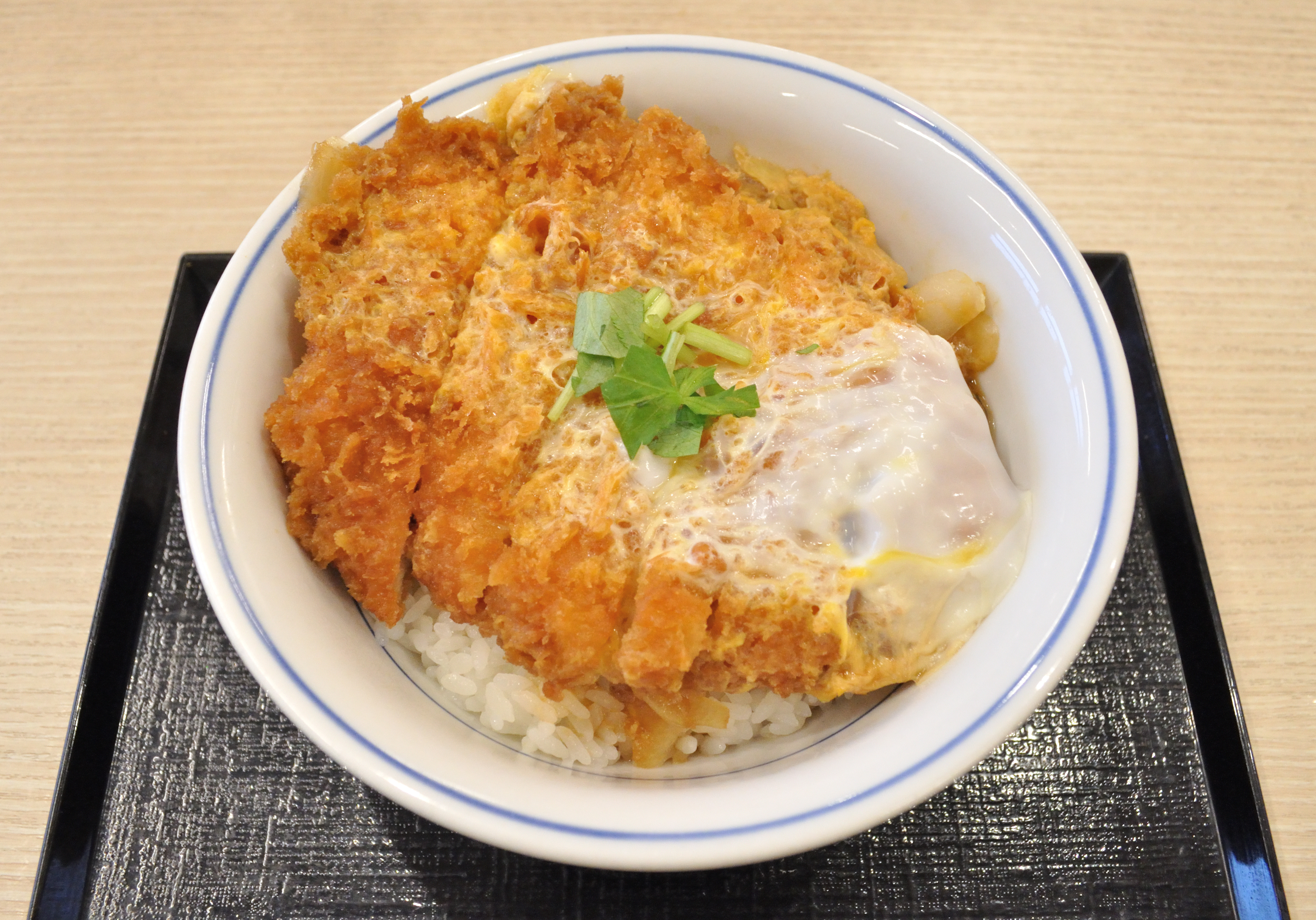
Katsudon

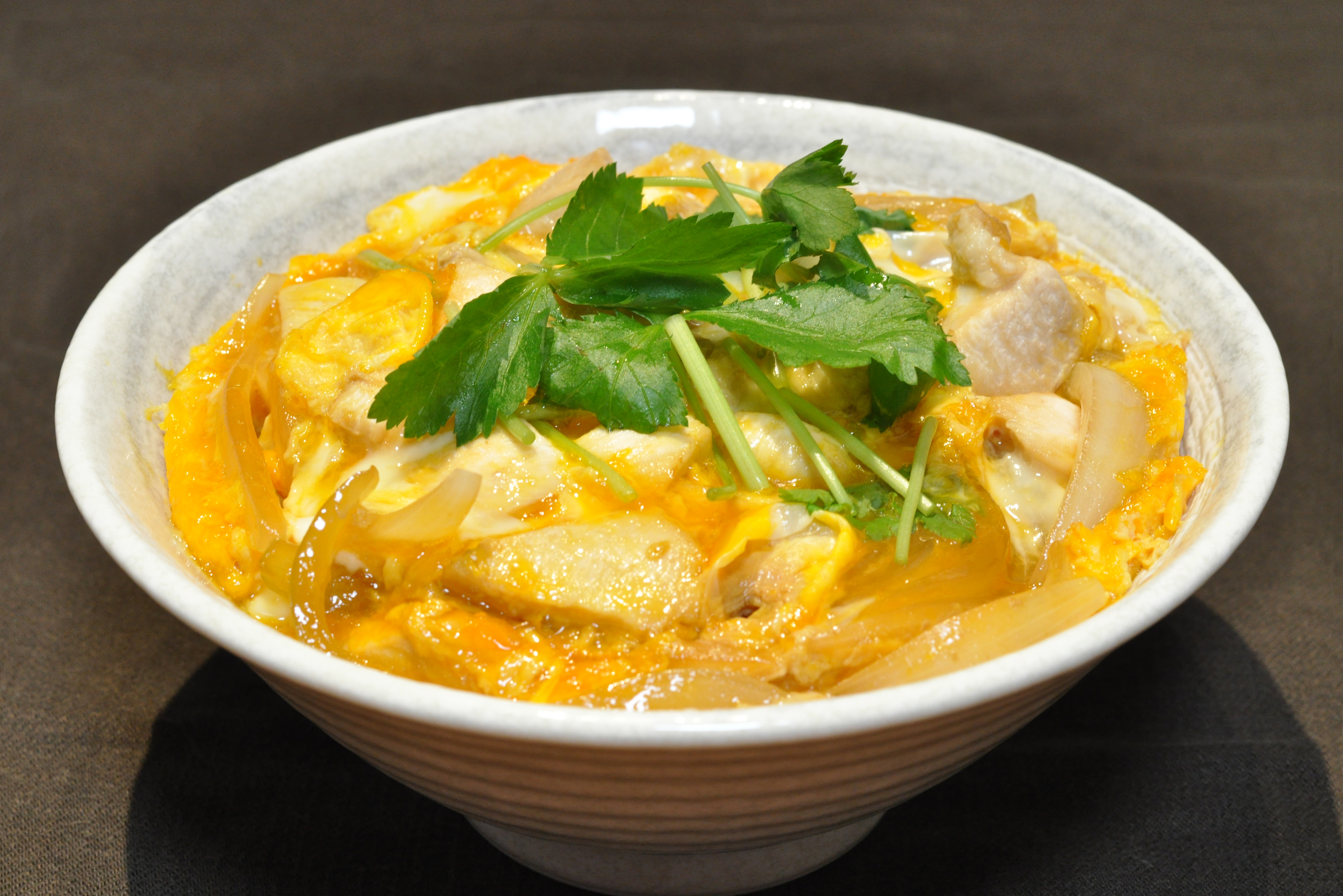
Oyakodon

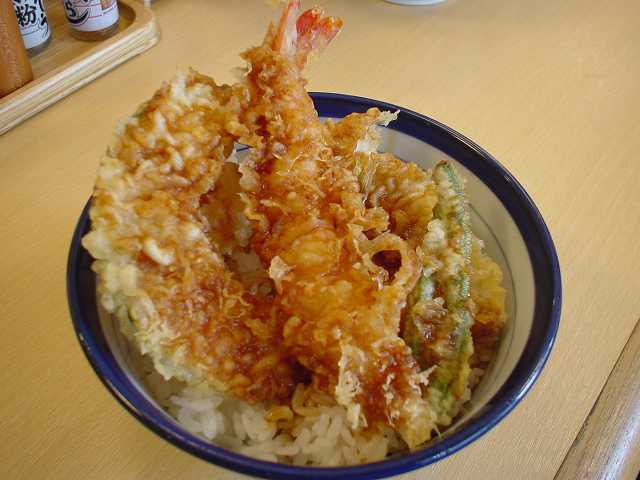
Tendon

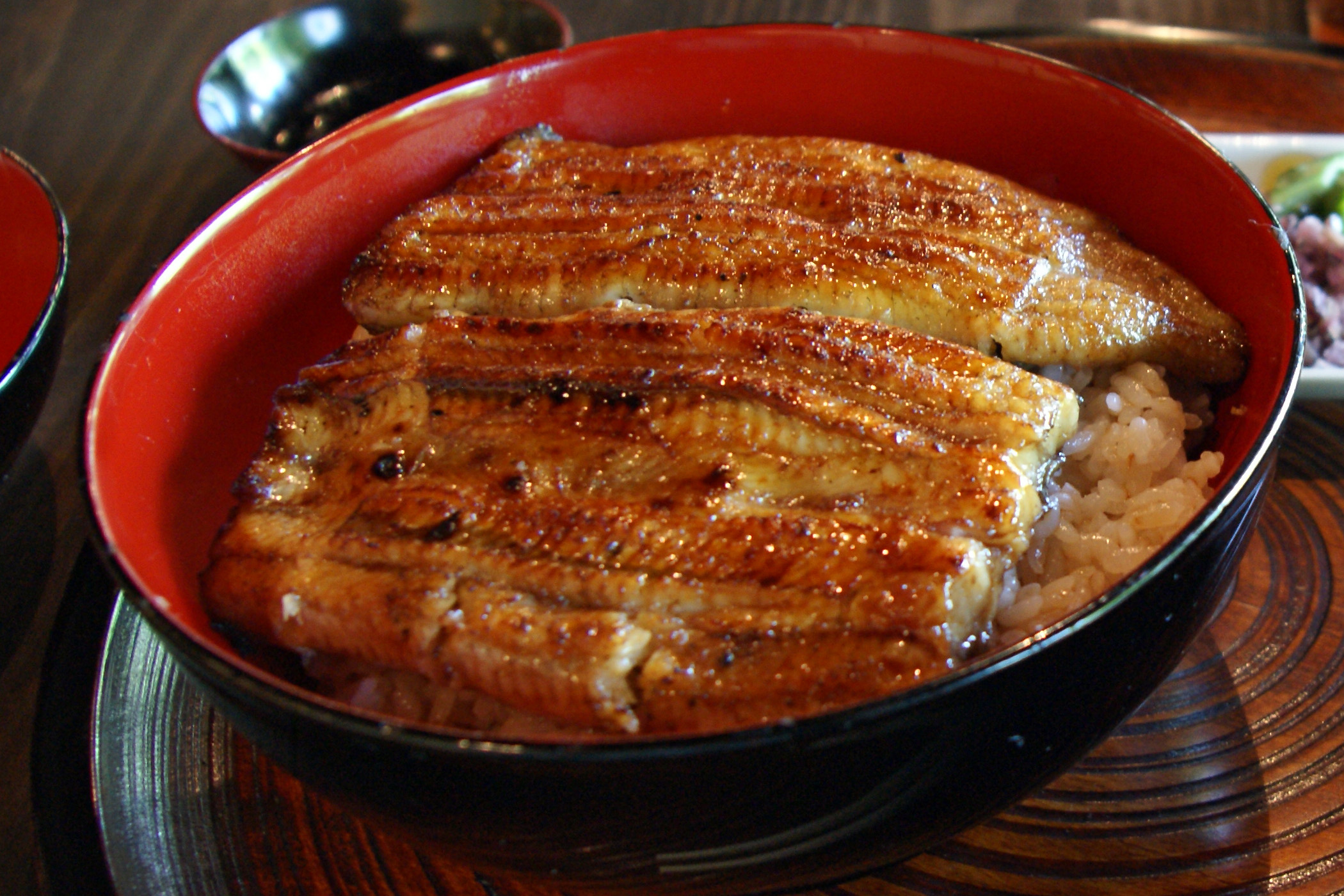
Unadon

=== Sushi (寿司) ===
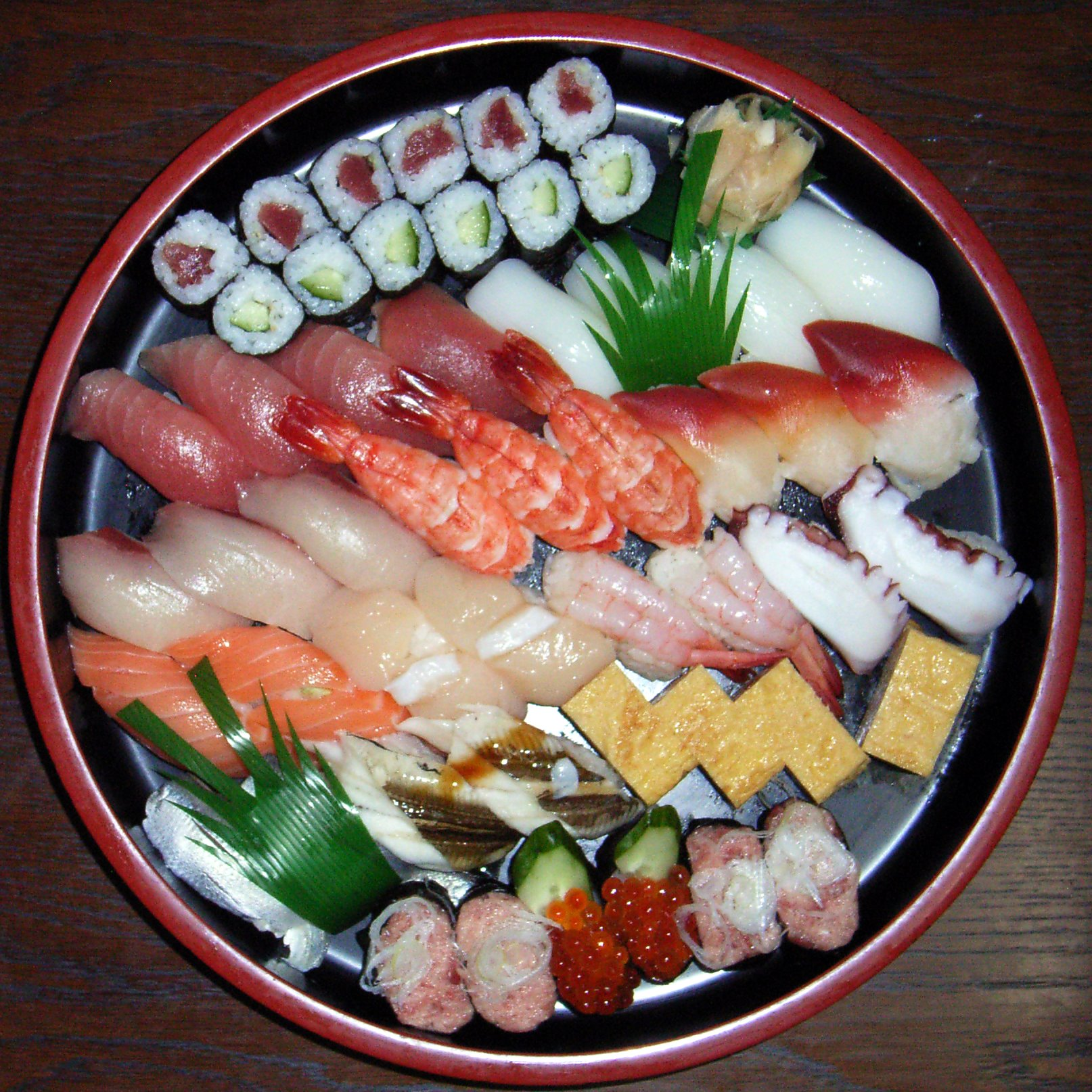
A sushi platter

Sushi (寿司, 鮨, 鮓) is a vinegared rice topped or mixed with various fresh ingredients, usually seafood or vegetables.

- Nigirizushi (握り寿司): Sushi with the ingredients on top of a block of rice.
- Makizushi (巻き寿司): Translated as "roll sushi". Seasoned rice and seafood or other ingredients are placed on a sheet of seaweed (nori, dried laver) and rolled into a cylindrical shape, then sliced into smaller rounds. Typical ingredients are Tamagoyaki (Japanese-style omelette), simmered shiitake mushroom, boiled prawn and cucumber.
  - Temaki (手巻き) orTemakizushi (手巻き寿司): Basically the same as makizushi, except that the nori is rolled into a cone-shape with the ingredients placed inside. Sometimes referred to as a "hand-roll".
- Chirashizushi (ちらし寿司) or Bara-zushi (バラ寿司): Translated as "scattered", chirashi involves fresh seafood, vegetables or other ingredients being placed on top of sushi rice in a bowl or dish.
- Inarizushi (稲荷寿司, お稲荷さん): Fried tofu packet braised in sweet soy sauce stuffed with sushi rice (no fillings)
- Oshizushi (押し寿司): A pressed sushi using cured or cooked fish, most commonly mackerel.
- Meharizushi (めはり寿司): Sumeshi wrapped in Takana leaves. Unique to Wakayama Prefecture.

== Other staples ==
=== Noodles (men-rui, 麺類) ===
Noodles (麺類) often take the place of rice in a meal. However, the Japanese appetite for rice is so strong that many restaurants even serve noodle-rice combination sets.

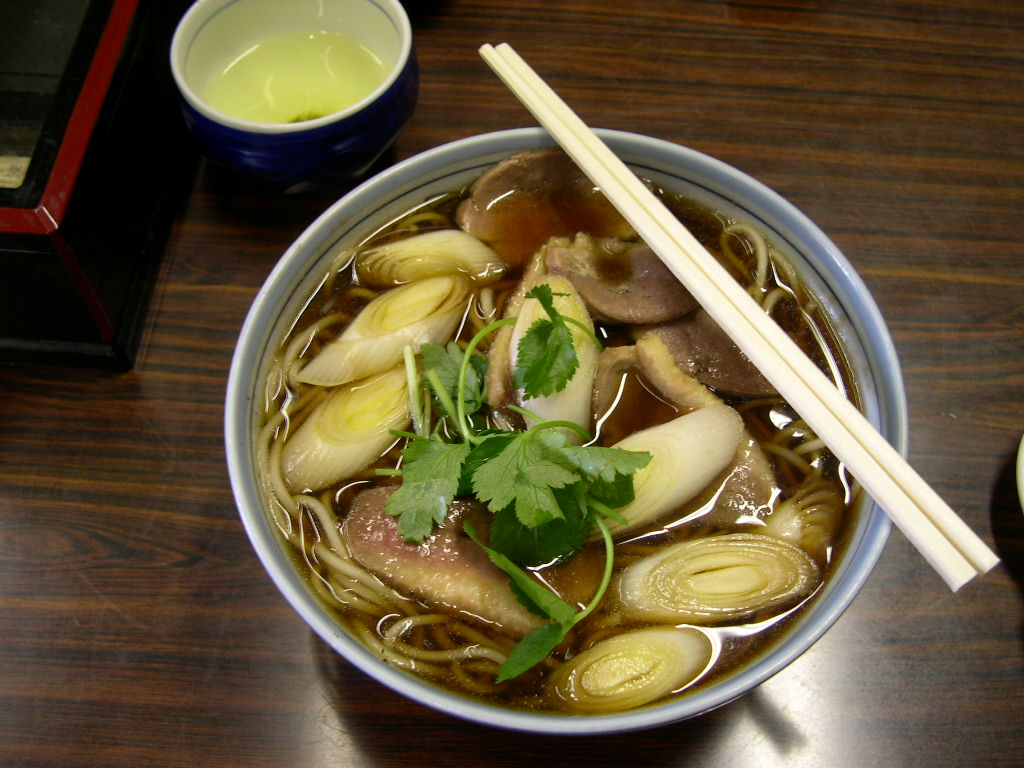
Kamo nanban: Soba with sliced duck breast, negi (scallions) and mitsuba

- Traditional Japanese noodles are usually served chilled with a dipping sauce, or in a hot soy-dashi broth.
  - Soba (蕎麦, そば): thin brown buckwheat noodles. Also known as Nihon-soba ("Japanese soba"). In Okinawa, soba likely refers to Okinawa soba (see below).
    - Zaru soba (ざるそば): Soba noodles served cold
  - Udon (うどん): thick white wheat noodles served with various toppings, usually in a hot soy-dashi broth, or sometimes in a Japanese curry soup.
    - Miso-nikomi-udon (味噌煮込みうどん): hard udon simmered in red miso soup
  - Sōmen (素麺, そうめん): thin white wheat noodles served chilled with a dipping sauce. Hot sōmen is called nyumen.

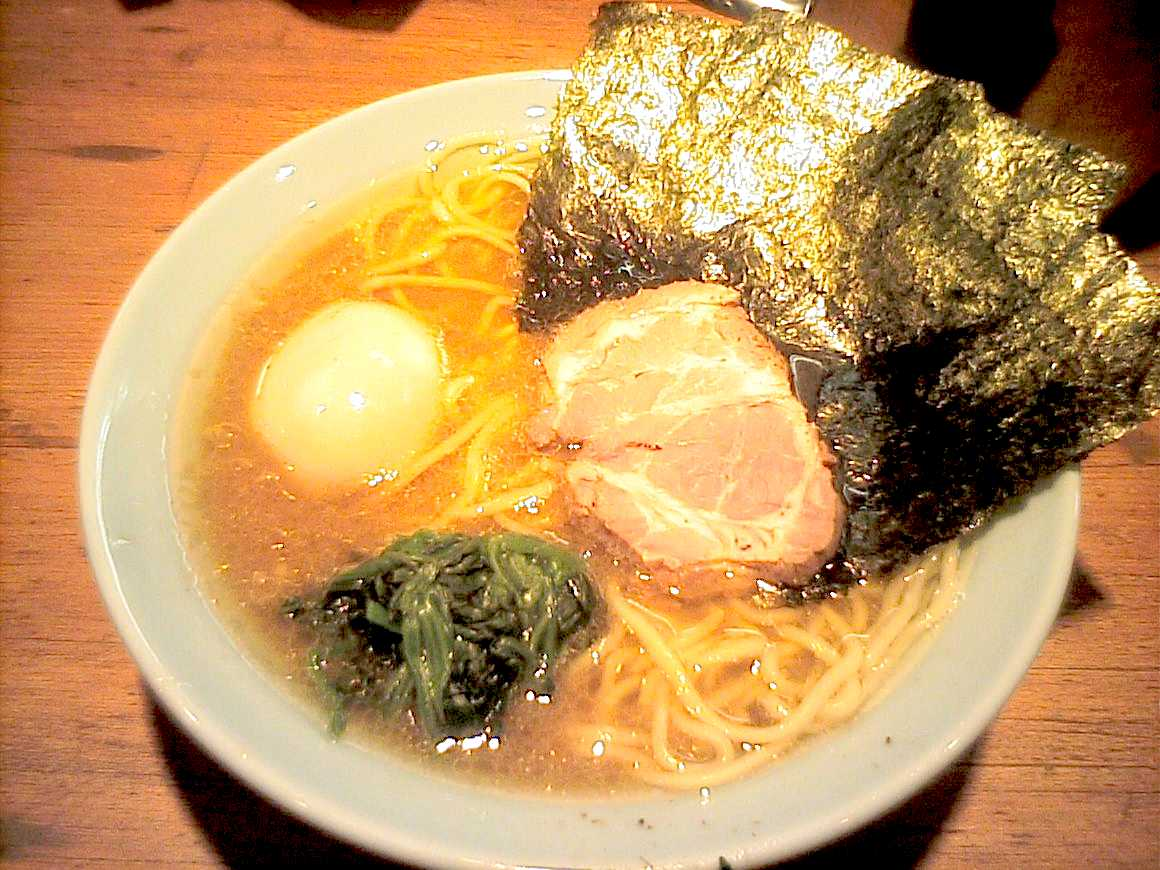
Ramen

- Ramen is typically served in a meat or chicken broth.
  - Ramen (ラーメン): thin light yellow noodles served in hot chicken or pork broth with various toppings, it is a common item in Japan. Also known as Shina-soba (支那そば) or Chūka-soba (中華そば)
  - Champon (ちゃんぽん): yellow noodles of medium thickness served with a variety of seafood and vegetable toppings in a hot chicken broth which originated in Nagasaki as a cheap food for students
  - Hiyashi chūka (冷やし中華): thin, yellow noodles served cold with a variety of toppings, such as cucumber, tomato, ham or chicken, bean sprouts, and thin-sliced omelet, and a cold sauce (soy sauce-based, sesame-based, etc.)
- Mazesoba (まぜそば: wheat noodles served with a number of savory toppings, including raw egg, ginger, and meat
- Okinawa soba (沖縄そば): thick wheat-flour noodles served in Okinawa, often served in a hot broth with sōki, steamed pork
- Yaki soba (焼きそば): fried noodles
- Yaki udon (焼きうどん): fried udon noodles

=== Bread (pan, パン) ===
Bread (the word "pan" (パン) is derived from the Portuguese pão) is not native to Japan and is not considered traditional Japanese food, but since its introduction in the 16th century it has become common.

- Curry bread (karē pan カレーパン): deep-fried bread filled with Japanese curry sauce
- Anpan (ampan アンパン): sweet roll filled with red bean (anko) paste
- Yakisoba-pan (焼きそばパン): bread roll sandwich with yakisoba (fried noodles and red pickled ginger) filling
- Korokke-pan (コロッケパン): bread roll sandwich with croquette (deep-fried patties mashed potato) filling
- Melon-pan (メロンパン): sweet round bun covered in a (sometimes melon-flavored) cookie-like coating, scored in criss-cross designs and baked
- Katsu-sando (カツサンド): sandwich with tonkatsu (breaded pork cutlet) filling
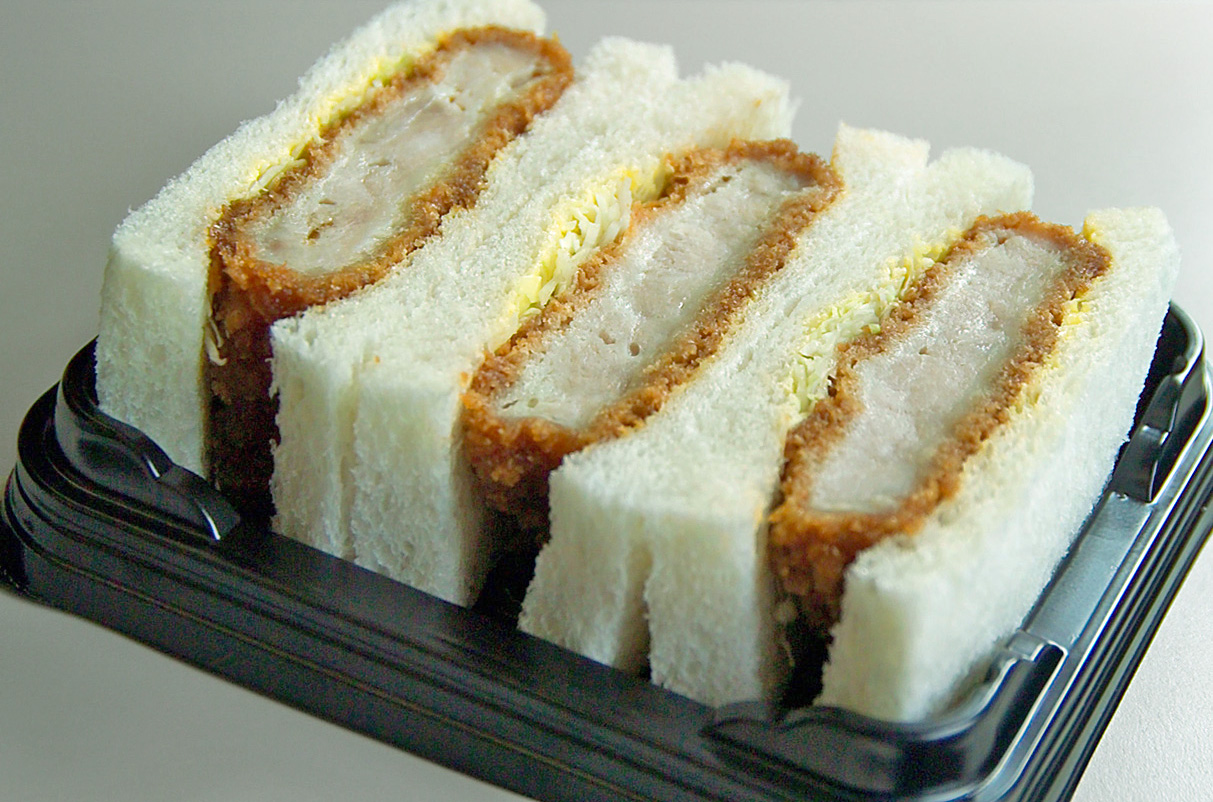
Breaded cutlet sandwich (カツサンド)

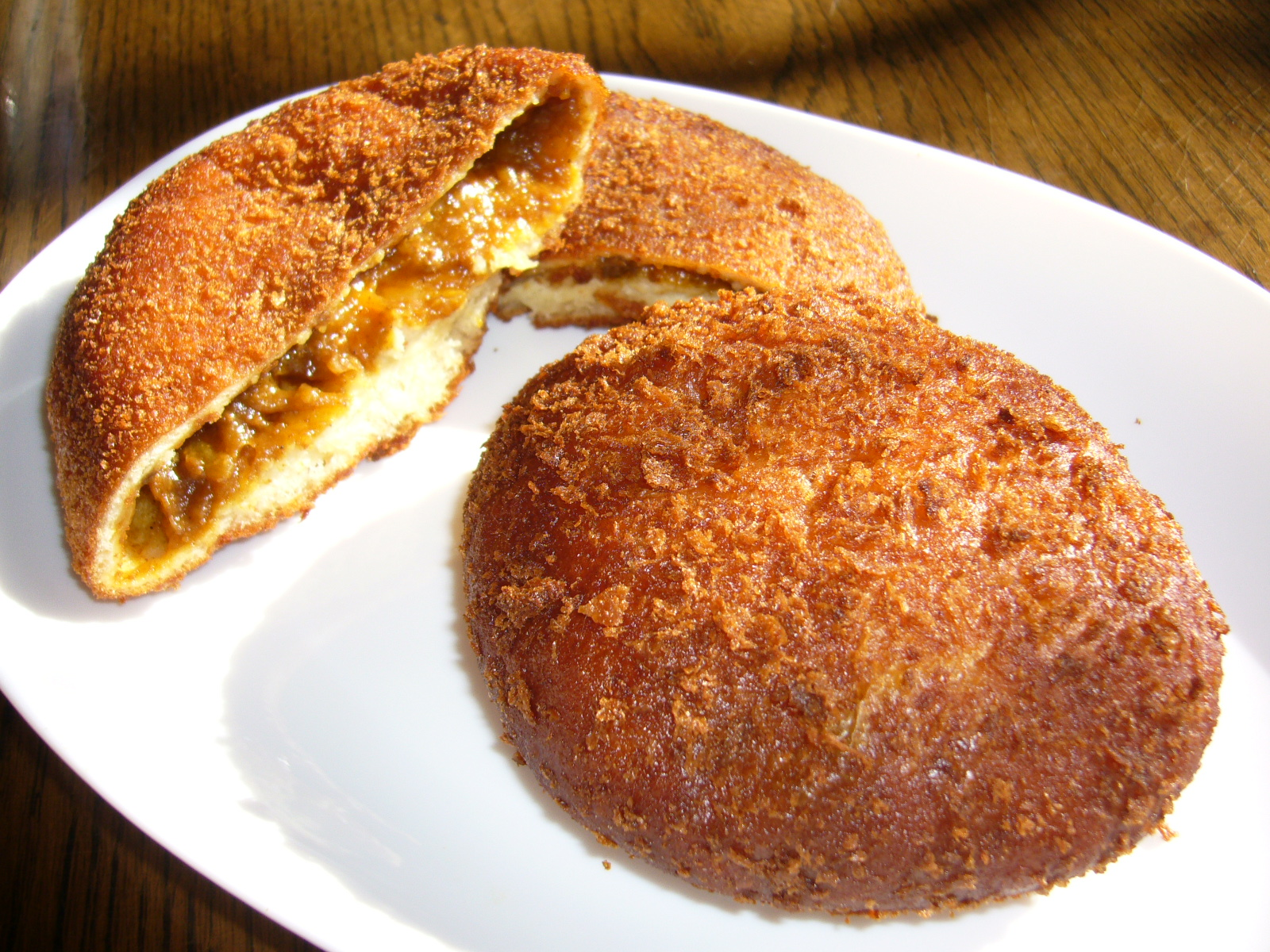
Curry bread

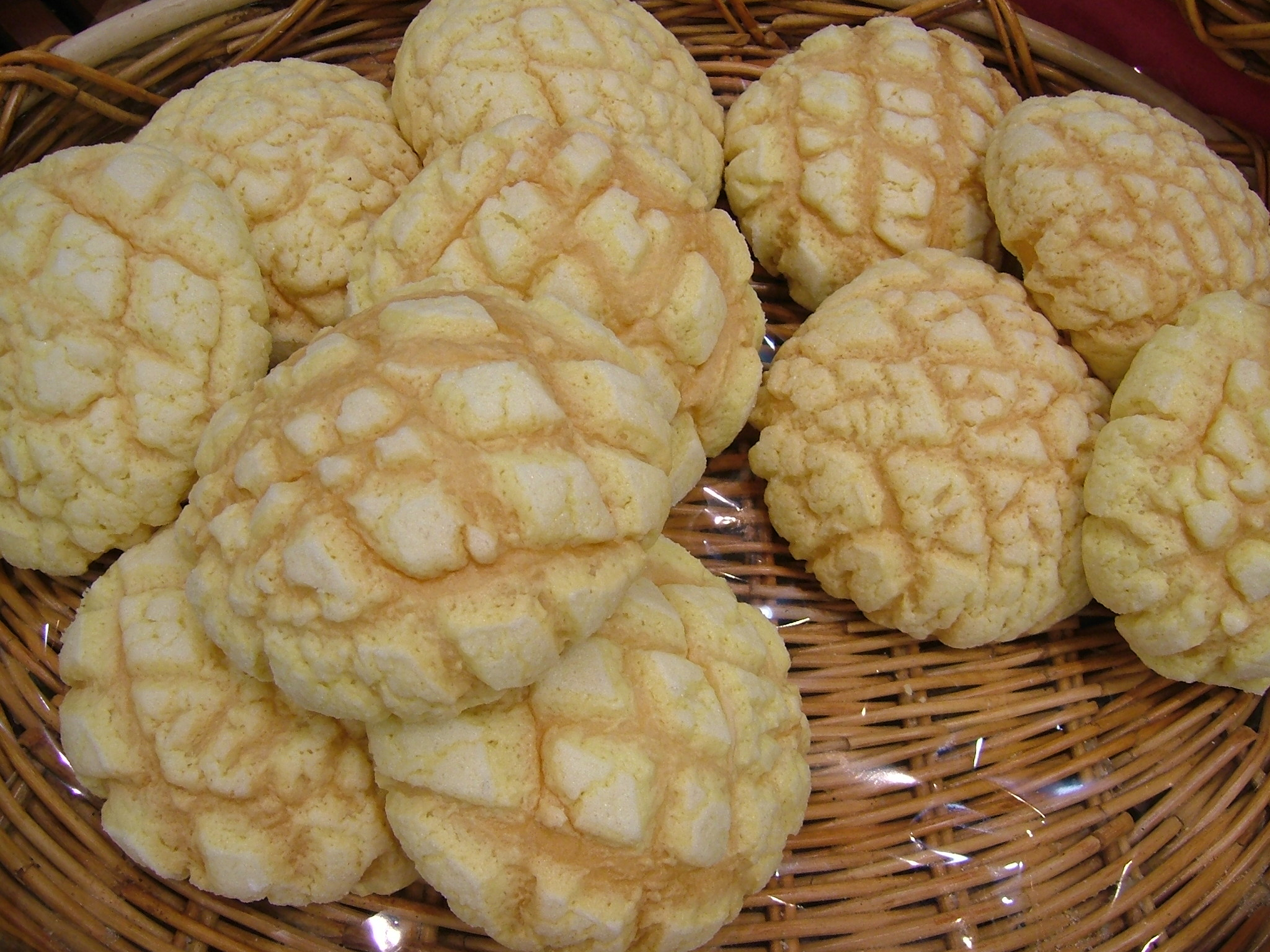
Melonpan

== Common Japanese main and side dishes (okazu, おかず) ==
Okazu (おかず): Common Japanese main and side dishes

=== Deep-fried dishes (agemono, 揚げ物) ===
Deep-fried dishes:

- Karaage (唐揚げ): bite-sized pieces of chicken, fish, octopus, or other meat, floured and deep fried. Common izakaya (居酒屋) food, also often available in convenience stores.
  - Nanbanzuke (南蛮漬け): marinated fried fish.
- Korokke (croquette コロッケ): breaded and deep-fried patties, containing either mashed potato or white sauce mixed with minced meat, vegetables or seafood. Popular everyday food.
- Kushikatsu (串カツ): skewered meat, vegetables or seafood, breaded and deep fried.
- Satsuma-age (薩摩揚げ): fried fishcake (surimi), often used as an ingredient for oden.
- Tempura (天ぷら): deep-fried vegetables or seafood in a light, distinctive batter.
  - Kakiage (かき揚げ)
- Tonkatsu (豚カツ): deep-fried breaded cutlet of pork (chicken versions are called chicken katsu).
- Furai (フライ): deep-fried breaded seafood and vegetables
- Agedashi dōfu (揚げ出し豆腐): cubes of deep-fried silken tofu served in hot broth.
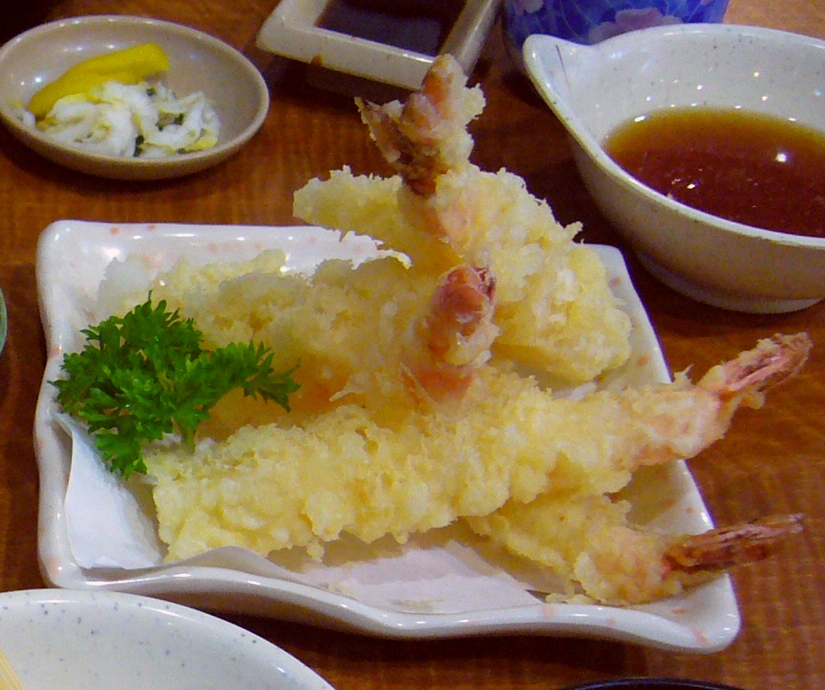
Ebi tempura

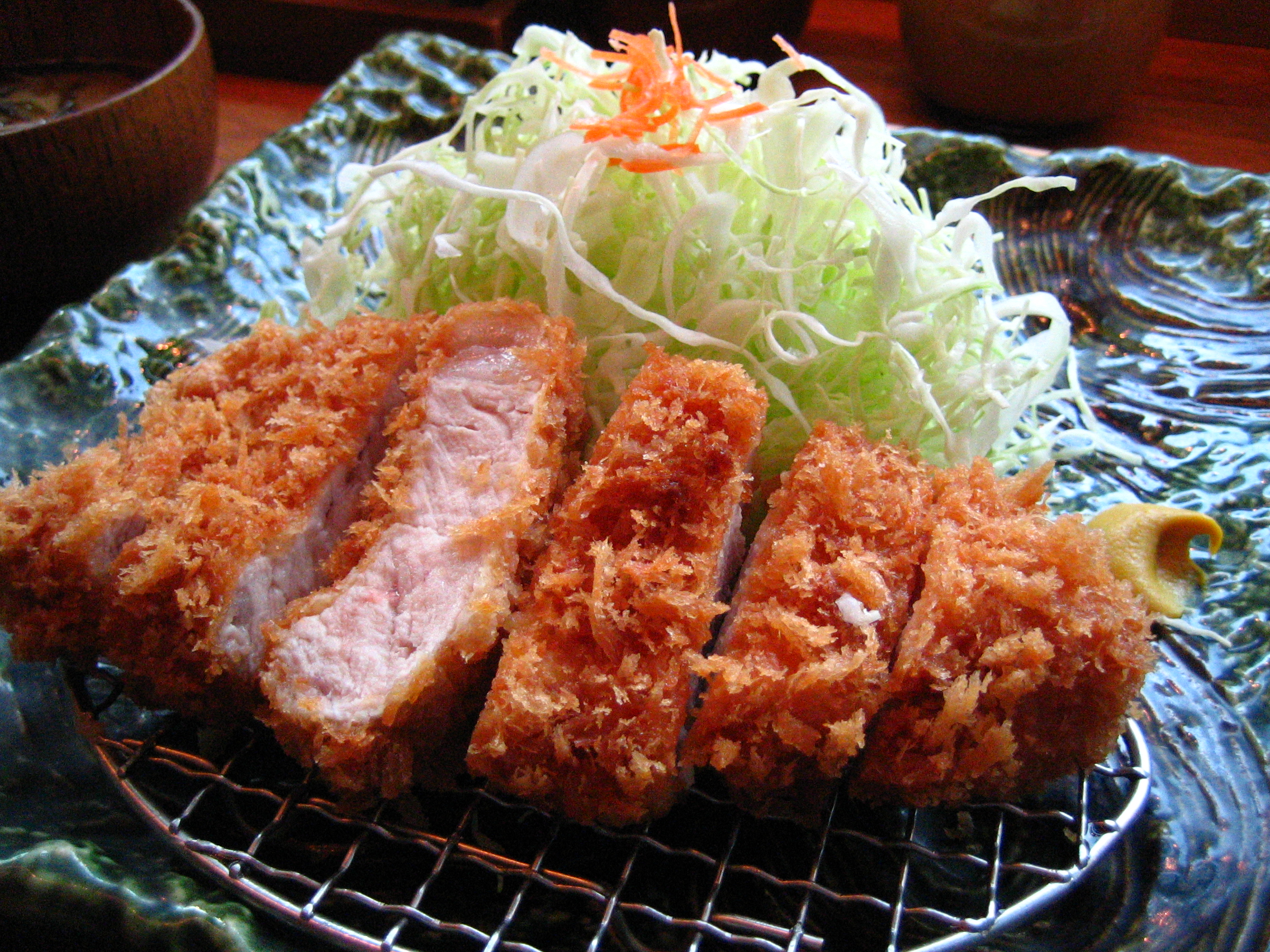
Tonkatsu

=== Grilled and pan-fried dishes (yakimono, 焼き物) ===
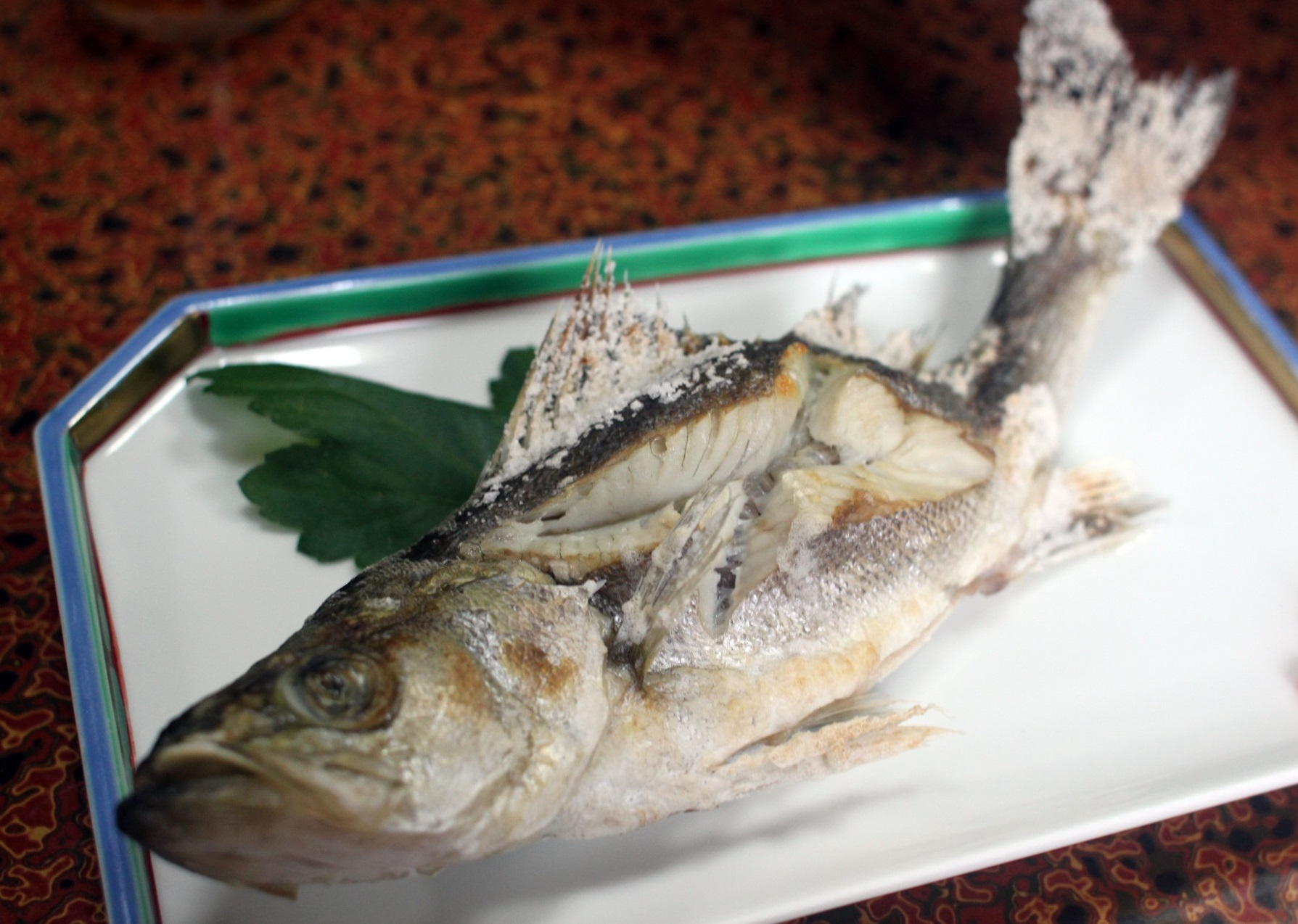
Yakizakana (grilled Fish)

- Yakimono (焼き物): Grilled and pan-fried dishes
  - Gyoza (餃子): Chinese ravioli-dumplings (potstickers), usually filled with pork and vegetables (spring onion, leek, cabbage, garlic, and ginger) and pan-fried
  - Kushiyaki (串焼き): skewers of meat and vegetables
  - Motoyaki (もと焼き): Baked seafood topped with a creamy sauce.
  - Okonomiyaki (お好み焼き) are savory pancakes with various meat and vegetable ingredients, flavored with the likes of Worcestershire sauce or mayonnaise.
  - Takoyaki (たこ焼き, 蛸焼き): a spherical, fried dumpling of batter with a piece of octopus inside. Popular street snack.
  - Teriyaki (照り焼き): grilled, broiled, or pan-fried meat, fish, chicken or vegetables glazed with a sweetened soy sauce
  - Unagi (鰻, うなぎ), including kabayaki (蒲焼): grilled and flavored eel
  - Yakiniku ("grilled meat" 焼肉) may refer to several things. Vegetables such as bite-sized onion, carrot, cabbage, mushrooms, and bell pepper are usually grilled together. Grilled ingredients are dipped in a sauce known as tare before being eaten.
    - Horumonyaki ("offal-grill" ホルモン焼き): similar homegrown dish, but using offal
    - Jingisukan (Genghis Khan ジンギスカン) barbecue: sliced lamb or mutton grilled with various vegetables, especially onion and cabbage and dipped in a rich tare sauce. A speciality of Hokkaidō.
  - Yakitori (焼き鳥): barbecued chicken skewers, usually served with beer. In Japan, yakitori usually consists of a wide variety of parts of the chicken. It is not usual to see straight chicken meat as the only type of yakitori in a meal.
  - Yakizakana (焼き魚) is flame-grilled fish, often served with grated daikon. Was one of the most common dishes served at home. Because of the simple cuisine, fresh fish in season are highly preferable. Some species traded as dried fish, such as hokke (Arabesque greenling) are also served this way.
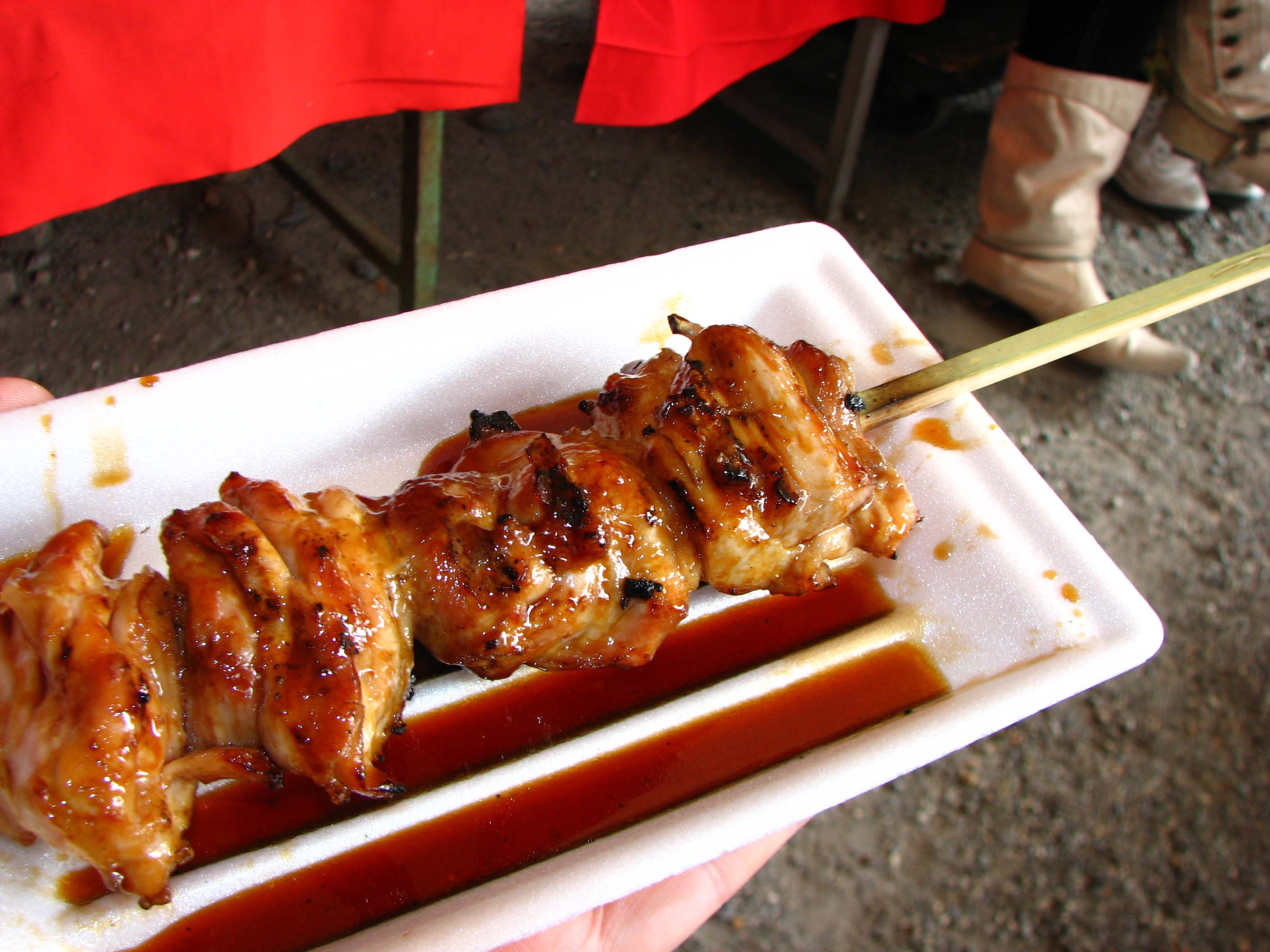
Yakitori (焼き鳥)

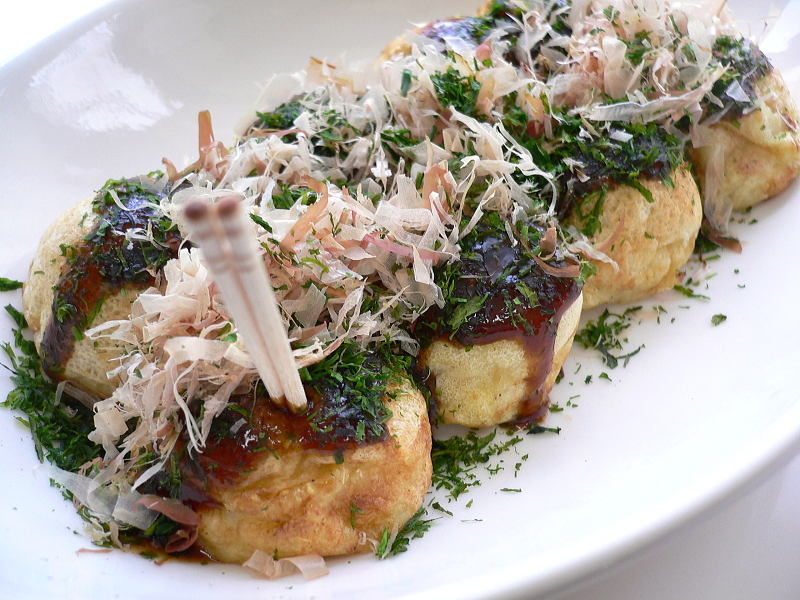
Takoyaki (たこ焼き, 蛸焼き)

=== Nabemono (one pot cooking, 鍋物) ===
Nabemono (鍋物) includes:

- Motsunabe (モツ鍋): beef offal, Chinese cabbage and various vegetables cooked in a light soup base.
- Shabu-shabu (しゃぶしゃぶ): hot pot with thinly sliced beef, vegetables, and tofu, cooked in a thin stock at the table and dipped in a soy or sesame-based dip before eating.
- Sukiyaki (すき焼き): thinly sliced beef and vegetables cooked in a mixture of soy sauce, dashi, sugar, and sake. Participants cook at the table then dip food into their individual bowls of raw egg before eating it.
- Chirinabe (ちり鍋): hot pot with fish and vegetables.
  - Tetchiri (てっちり): hot pot with blowfish and vegetables, a specialty of Osaka.
- Chigenabe (チゲ鍋) or Kimuchinabe (キムチ鍋): hot pot with meat, seafood and vegetables in a broth seasoned with gochujang, and Kimchi.
- Imoni (芋煮): a thick taro potato stew popular in Northern Japan during the autumn season
- Kiritanponabe (きりたんぽ鍋): freshly cooked rice is pounded, formed into cylinders around Japanese cypress skewers, and toasted at an open hearth. The kiritanpo are used as dumplings in soups.
- Chankonabe (ちゃんこ鍋): commonly eaten in vast quantity by sumo wrestlers as part of a weight-gain diet.
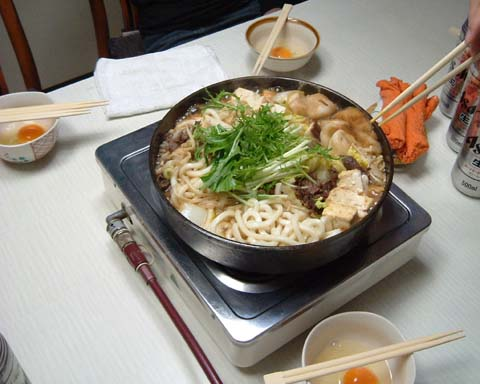
Sukiyaki (すき焼き)

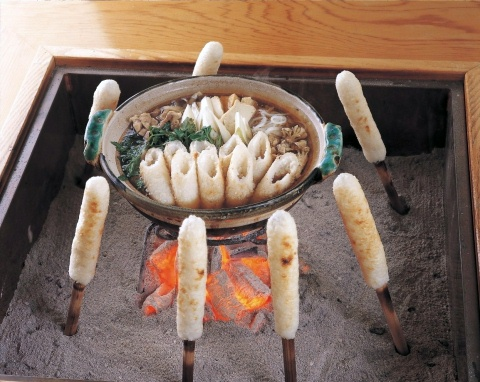
Kiritanpo

=== Nimono (stewed dishes, 煮物) ===
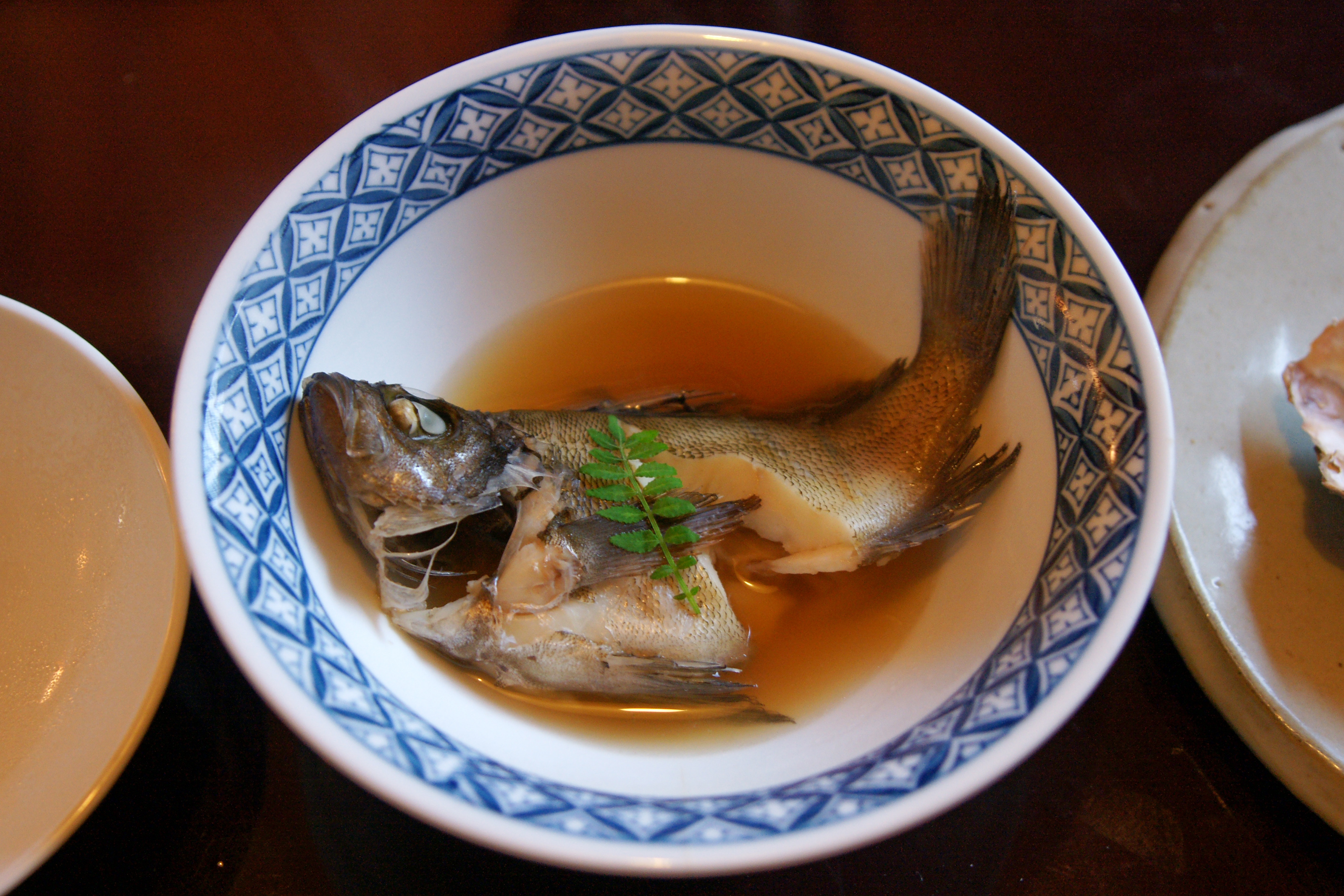
Seaperch poached with ginger, soy sauce, mirin, sugar, sake, and water.

Nimono (煮物) is a stewed or simmered dish. A base ingredient is simmered in shiru stock flavored with sake, soy sauce, and a small amount of sweetening.

- Oden (おでん, "kantou-daki", 関東炊き): surimi, boiled eggs, daikon radish, konnyaku, and fish cakes stewed in a light, soy-flavored dashi broth. Common wintertime food and often available in convenience stores.
- Kakuni (角煮): chunks of pork belly stewed in soy, mirin and sake with large pieces of daikon and whole boiled eggs. The Okinawan variation, using awamori, soy sauce and miso, is known as Rafute (ラフテー).
- Nikujaga (肉じゃが): beef and potato stew, flavored with sweet soy.
- Nizakana (煮魚): fish poached in sweet soy (often on the menu as nitsuke (煮付け)).
- Sōki (ソーキ): Okinawan dish of pork stewed with bone.

=== Itamemono (stir-fried dishes, 炒め物) ===
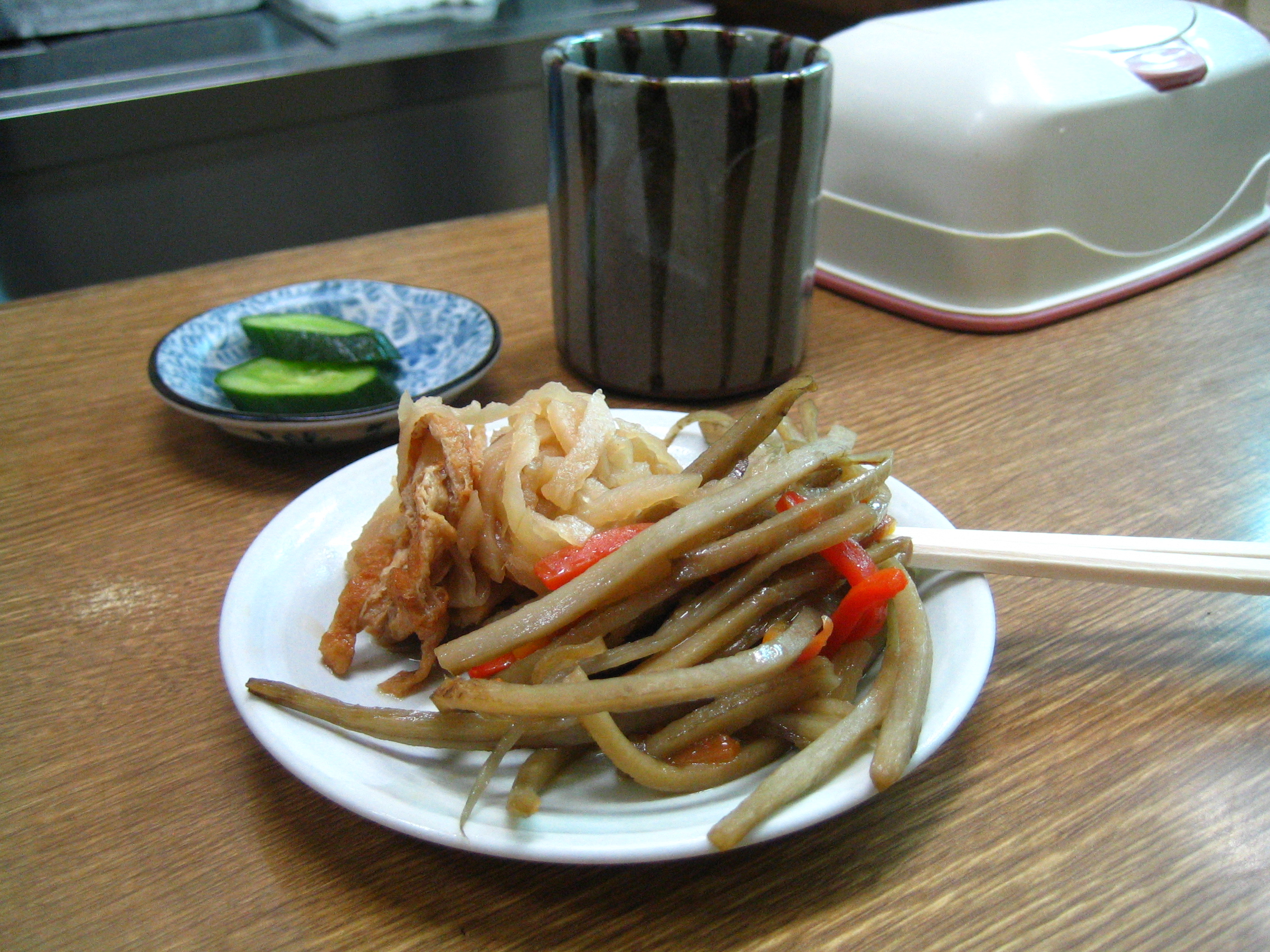
Kinpira gobo (金平)

Stir-frying (炒め物) is not a native method of cooking in Japan, however mock-Chinese stir fries such as yasai itame (野菜炒め, stir fried vegetables) have been a staple in homes and canteens across Japan since the 1950s. Home grown stir fries include:

- Chanpurū (チャンプルー): A stir-fry from Okinawa, of vegetables, tofu, meat or seafood and sometimes egg. Many varieties, the most famous being gōyā chanpurū.
- Kinpira gobo (金平): Thin sticks of greater burdock (gobo, ゴボウ) and other root vegetables stir-fried and braised in sweetened soy.

=== Sashimi (刺身) ===
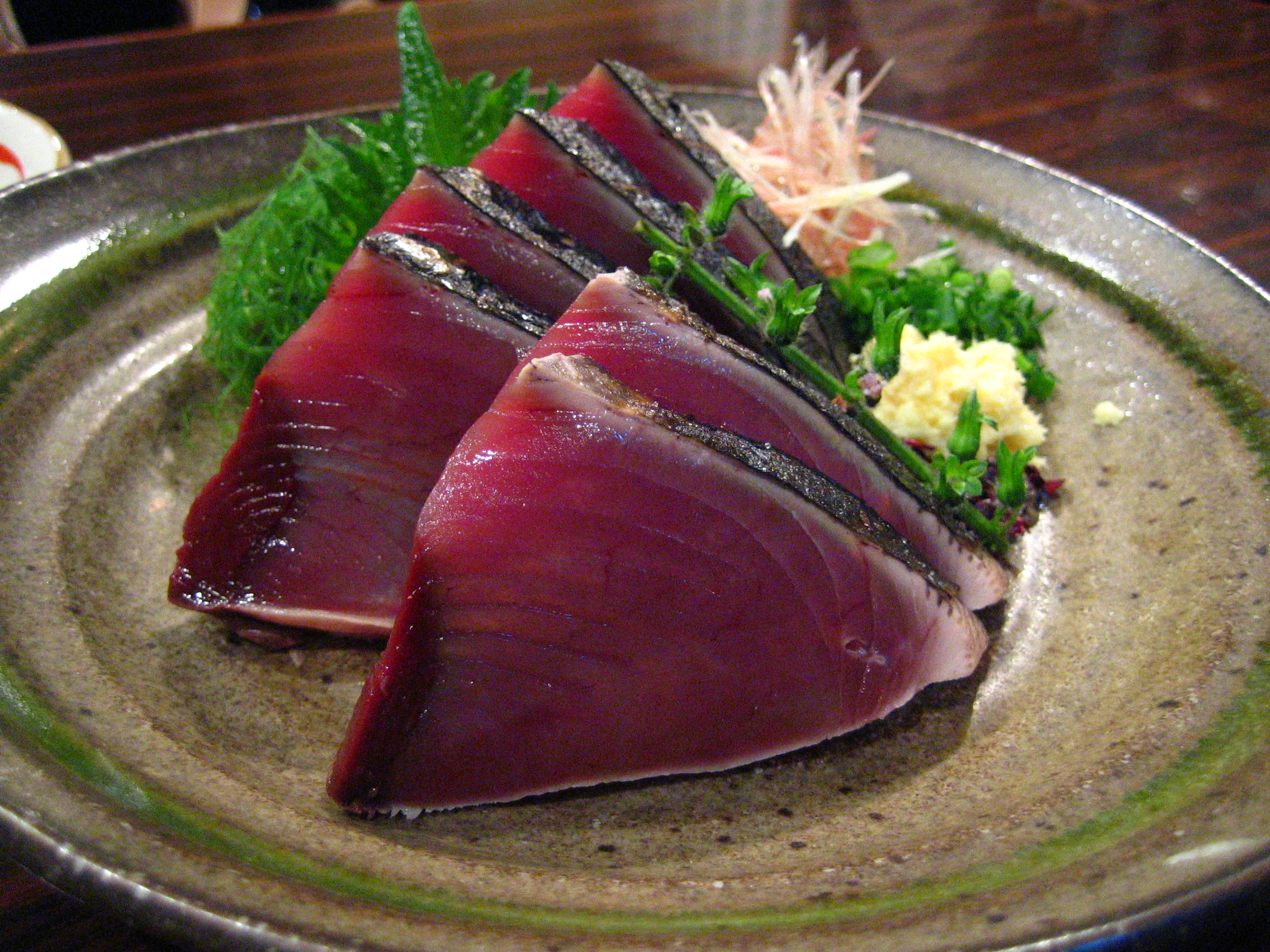
Bonito (skipjack tuna) tataki. Often on the menu as "Katsuo no Tataki" (鰹のタタキ)

Sashimi (刺身) is raw, thinly sliced foods served with a dipping sauce and simple garnishes; usually fish or shellfish served with soy sauce and wasabi. Less common variations include:

- Fugu (河豚): sliced poisonous pufferfish (sometimes lethal), a uniquely Japanese specialty. The chef responsible for preparing it must be licensed.
- Ikizukuri (活き造り): live sashimi
- Tataki (たたき): raw/very rare skipjack tuna or beef steak seared on the outside and sliced, or a finely chopped raw fish (Japanese jack mackerel or Sardine), spiced with the likes of chopped spring onions, ginger or garlic paste.
- Basashi (馬刺し): horse meat sashimi, sometimes called sakura (桜), is a regional speciality in certain areas such as Shinshu (Nagano, Gifu and Toyama prefectures) and Kumamoto. Basashi features on the menu of many izakayas, even on the menus of big national chains.
- Torisashi (鶏刺し): chicken breast sashimi, regional specialty of Kagoshima, Miyazaki prefectures
- Rebasashi (レバ刺し) is typically liver of calf served completely raw (the rare version is called "aburi": あぶり). It is usually dipped in salted sesame oil rather than soy sauce.

=== Soups (suimono (吸い物) and shirumono (汁物)) ===
The soups (suimono (吸い物) and shirumono (汁物)) include:

- Miso soup (味噌汁): soup made with miso suspended in dashi, usually containing two or three types of solid ingredients, such as seaweed, vegetables or tofu.
- Tonjiru (豚汁): similar to miso soup, except that pork is added to the ingredients
- Dangojiru (団子汁): soup made with dumplings along with seaweed, tofu, lotus root, or any number of other vegetables and roots
- Sumashijiru (澄まし汁) or "osumashi" (お澄まし): a clear soup made with dashi and seafood or chicken.
- Zōni (雑煮): soup containing mochi rice cakes along with various vegetables and often chicken. It is usually eaten at New Years Day.
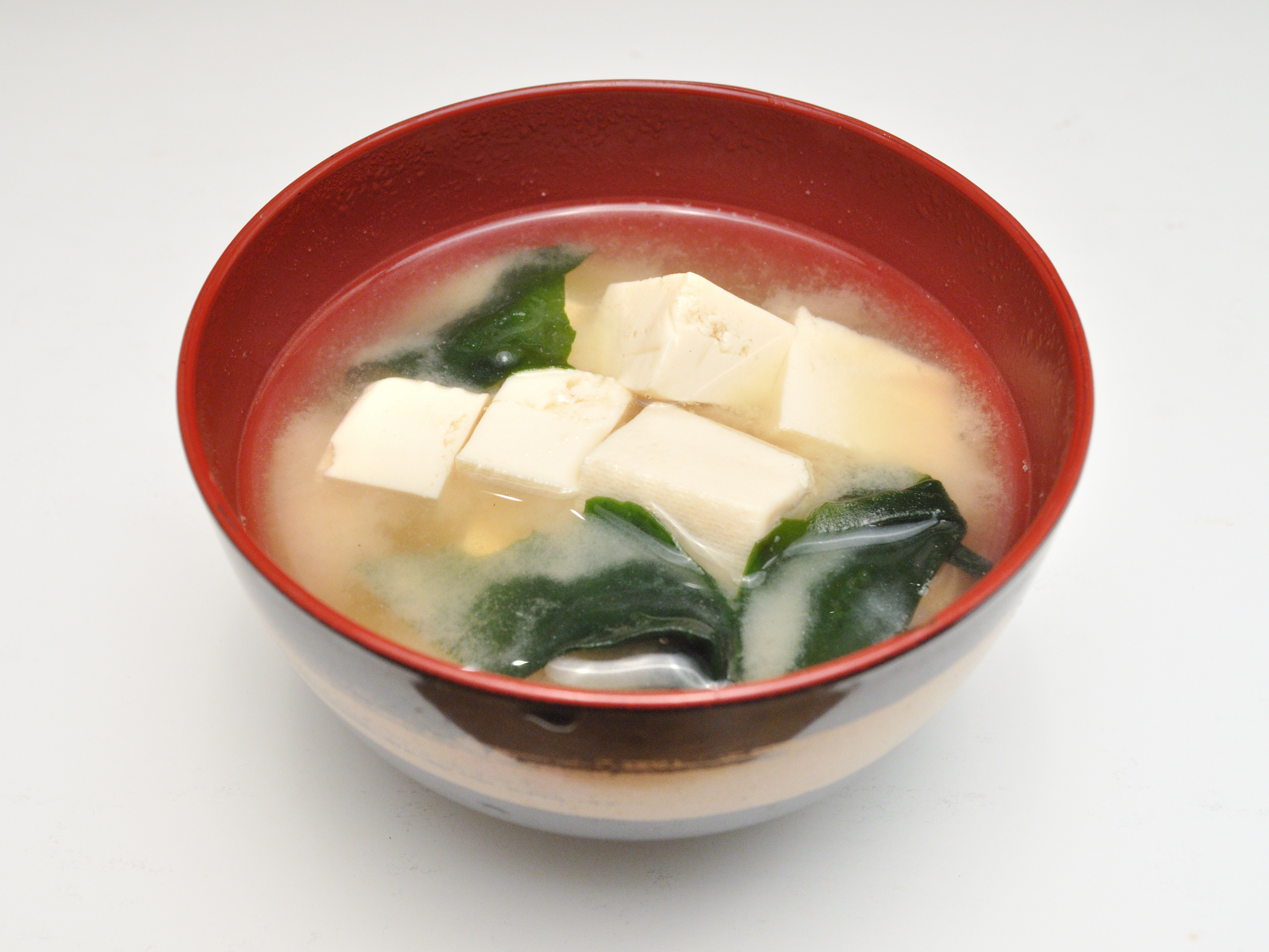
Miso soup (味噌汁)

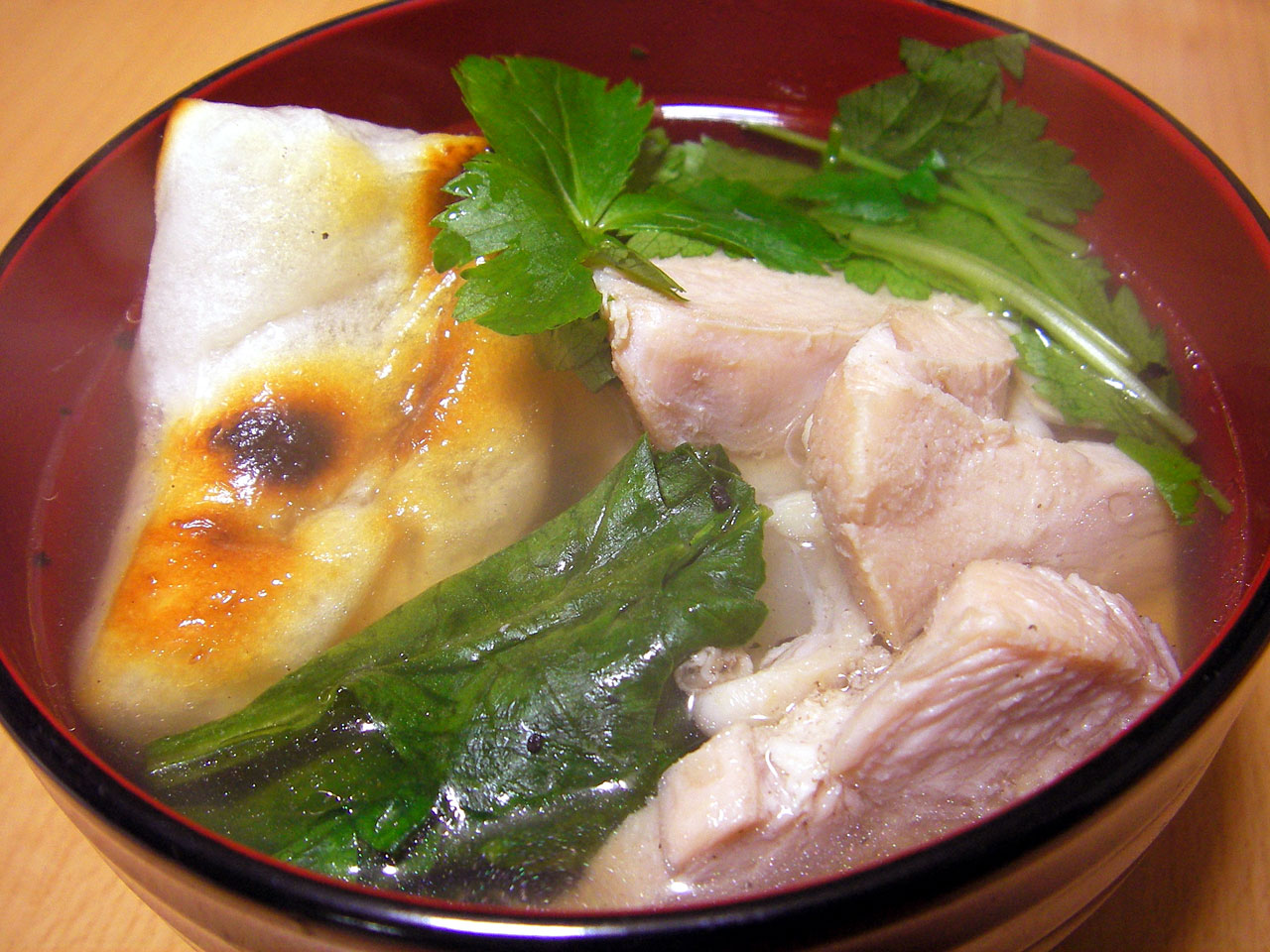
Zōni

=== Pickled or salted foods (tsukemono, 漬け物) ===
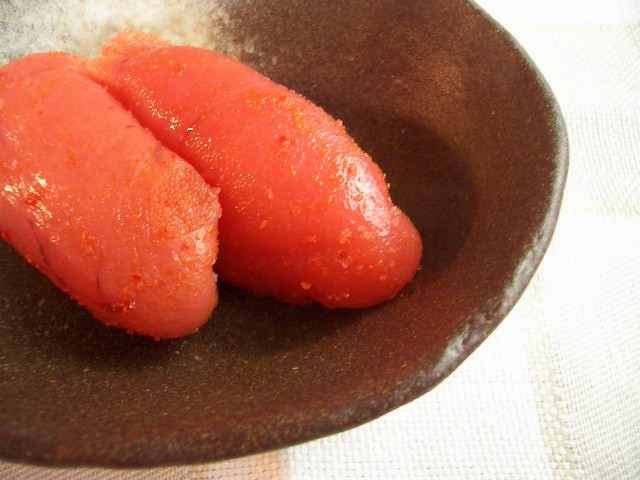
Karashimentaiko (辛子明太子)

These foods are usually served in tiny portions, as a side dish to be eaten with white rice, to accompany sake or as a topping for rice porridges.

- Ikura (いくら): salt cured and pickled soy sauce salmon roe.
- Tarako (たらこ): Salt-cured cod roe or pollock roe
  - Mentaiko (明太子): salt-cured and red pepper pickled pollock roe
- Shiokara (塩辛): salty fermented viscera
- Tsukemono (漬物): pickled vegetables, hundreds of varieties and served with most rice-based meals
  - Umeboshi (梅干): small, pickled ume fruit.
- Tsukudani (佃煮): Very small fish, shellfish or seaweed stewed in sweetened soy for preservation
- Sunomono (酢の物): vegetables such as cucumber or wakame, or sometimes crab, marinated in rice vinegar
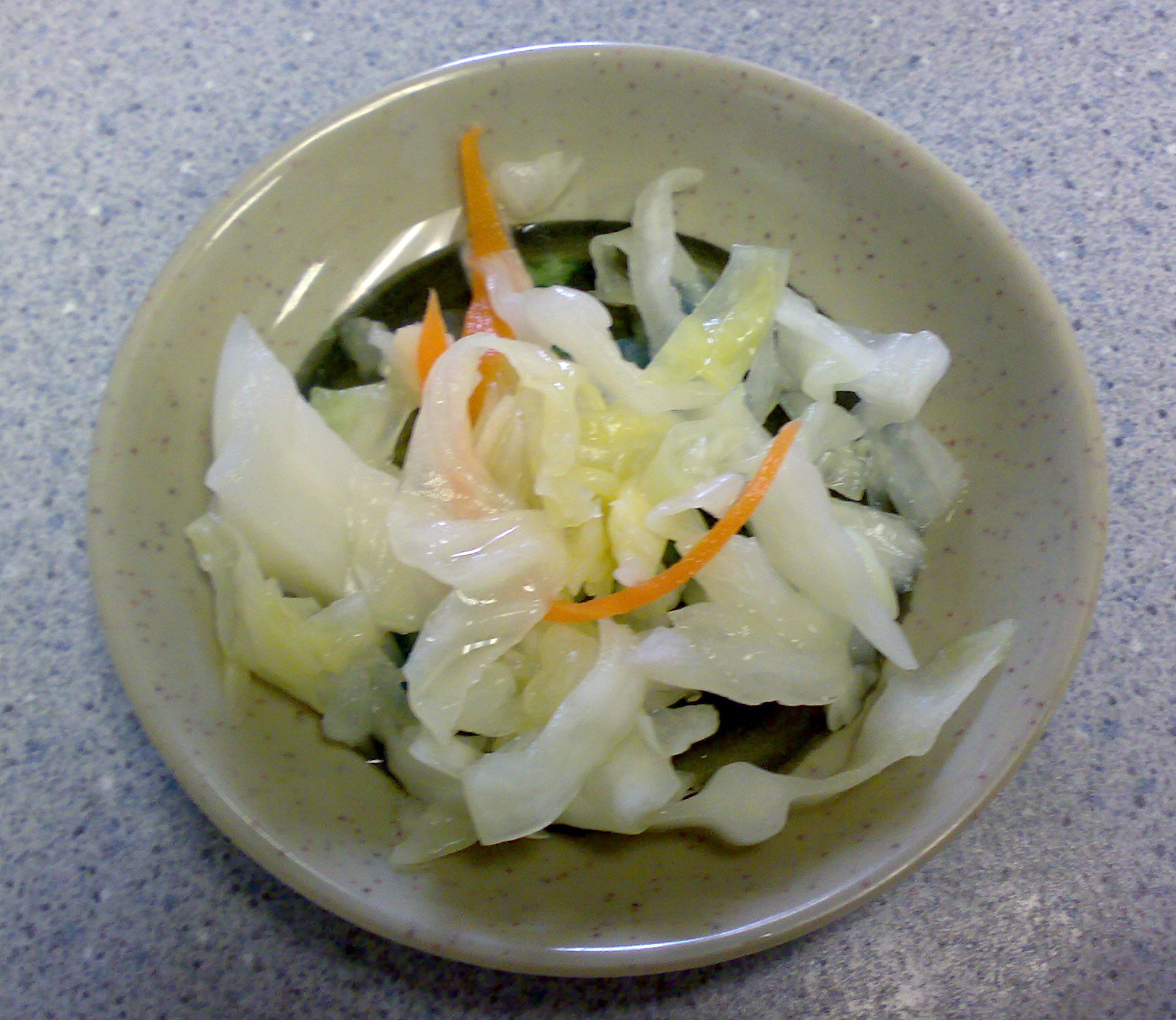
Tsukemono

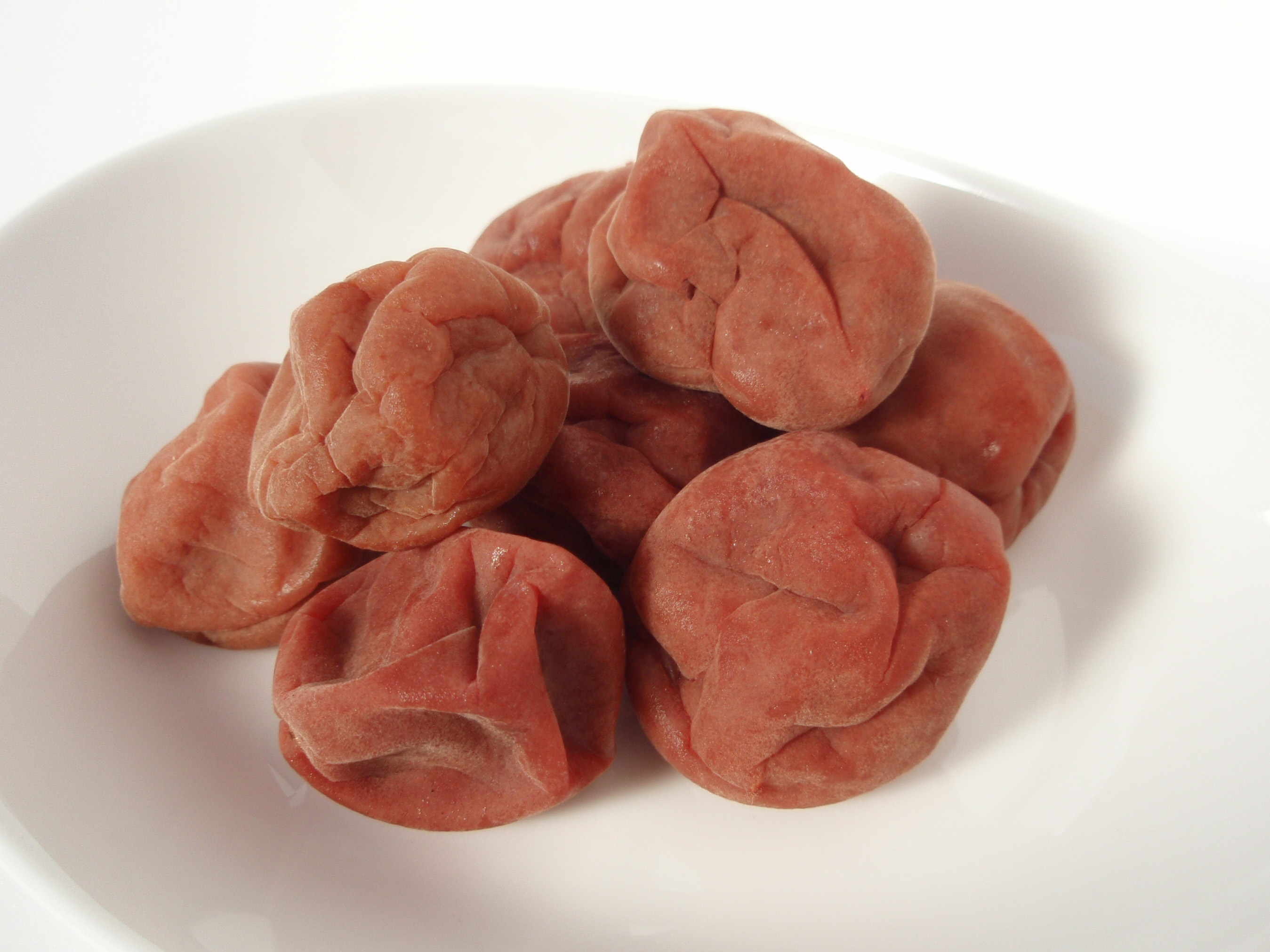
Umeboshi (梅干)

=== Side dishes (惣菜) ===
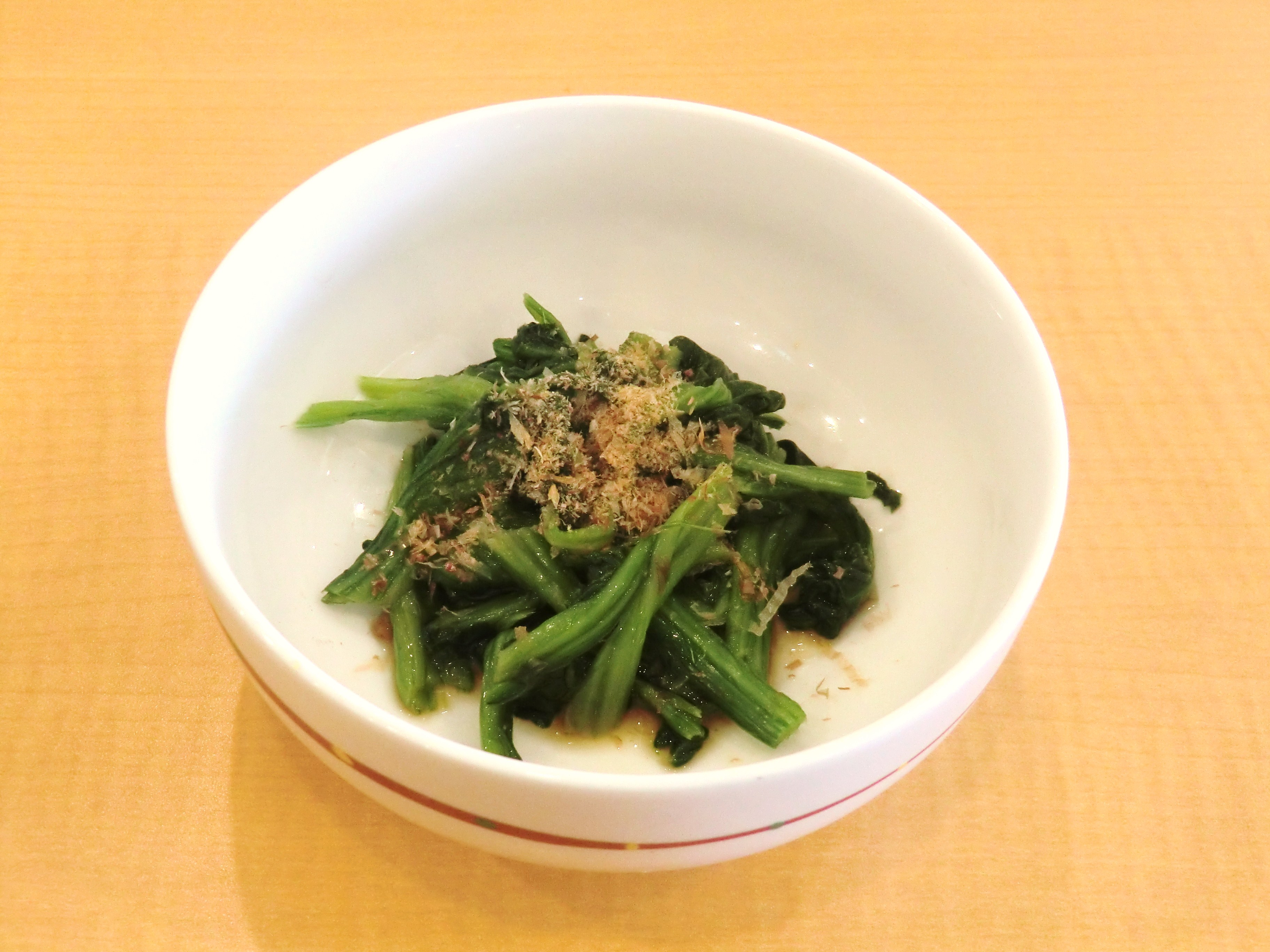
Ohitashi (お浸し)

- Bento or Obento (弁当, 御弁当) is a combination meal served in a wooden box, usually as a cold lunchbox.
- Chawan mushi (茶碗蒸し) is meat (seafood and/or chicken) and vegetables steamed in egg custard.
- Edamame (枝豆) is boiled and salted pods of soybeans, eaten as a snack, often to accompany beer.
- Himono (干物): dried fish, often aji (Japanese jack mackerel, 鯵). Traditionally served for breakfast with rice, miso soup and pickles.
- Hiyayakko (冷奴): chilled tofu with garnish
- Nattō (納豆): fermented soybeans, stringy like melted cheese, infamous for its strong smell and slippery texture. Often eaten for breakfast. Typically popular in Kantō and Tōhoku but slowly gaining popularity in other regions in which nattō was not as popular
- Ohitashi (お浸し): boiled greens such as spinach, chilled and flavored with soy sauce, often with garnish
- Osechi (御節): traditional foods eaten at New Year
- Japanese salad dressings
  - Wafu dressing (和風ドレッシング): literally "Japanese-style dressing" is a vinaigrette-type salad dressing based on soy sauce, popular in Japan.
  - Sanbaizu (三杯酢): The so-called vinegar that is blended with the ingredient here is often sanbaizu ("three cupful/spoonful vinegar"), which is a blend of vinegar, mirin, and soy sauce.
- Shimotsukare (しもつかれ): made of vegetables, soybeans, abura-age (あぶらあげ or deep fried tofu skins) and sake kasu (酒粕, rice pulp from fermented sake).

=== Chinmi (珍味) ===
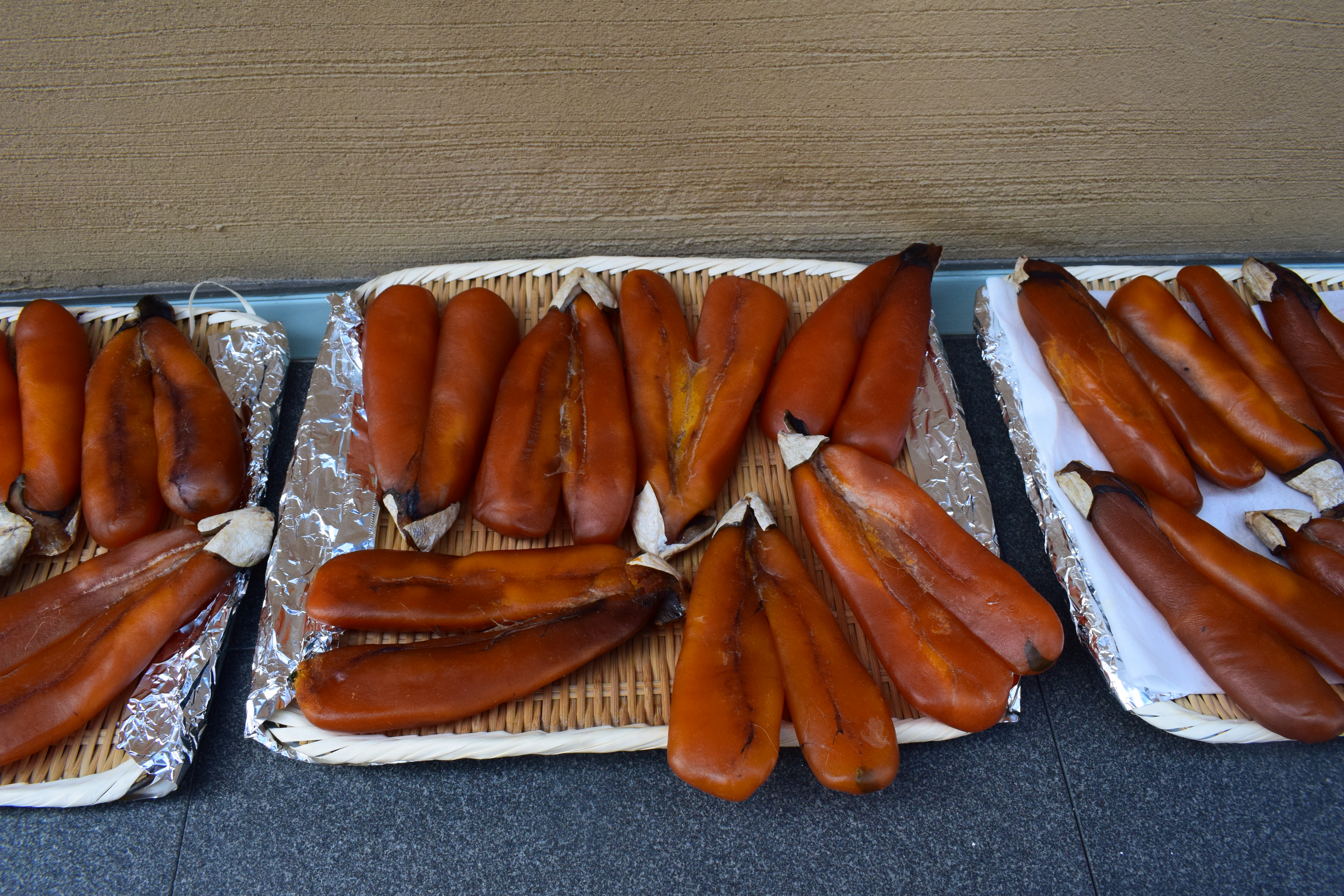
Chinmi: Salt-pickled mullet roe (karasumi)

Chinmi (珍味) are regional delicacies, and include:

- Ankimo (あん肝)
- Karasumi (カラスミ)
- Konowata (このわた)
- Mozuku (モズク)
- Uni (ウニ): specifically, salt-pickled sea urchin

Although most Japanese eschew eating insects, in some regions, locust (inago, イナゴ) and bee larvae (hachinoko, 蜂の子) are not uncommon dishes. The larvae of species of caddisflies and stoneflies (zaza-mushi, ざざむし), harvested from the Tenryū river as it flows through Ina, Nagano, is also boiled and canned, or boiled and then sautéed in soy sauce and sugar. Japanese clawed salamander (ハコネサンショウウオ, Hakone Sanshōuo; Onychodactylus japonicus)) is eaten as well in Hinoemata, Fukushima in early summer.

== Sweets and snacks (okashi (おかし), oyatsu (おやつ)) ==
- Okashi (おかし), Oyatsu (おやつ): Sweets and snacks

=== Japanese-style sweets (wagashi, 和菓子) ===
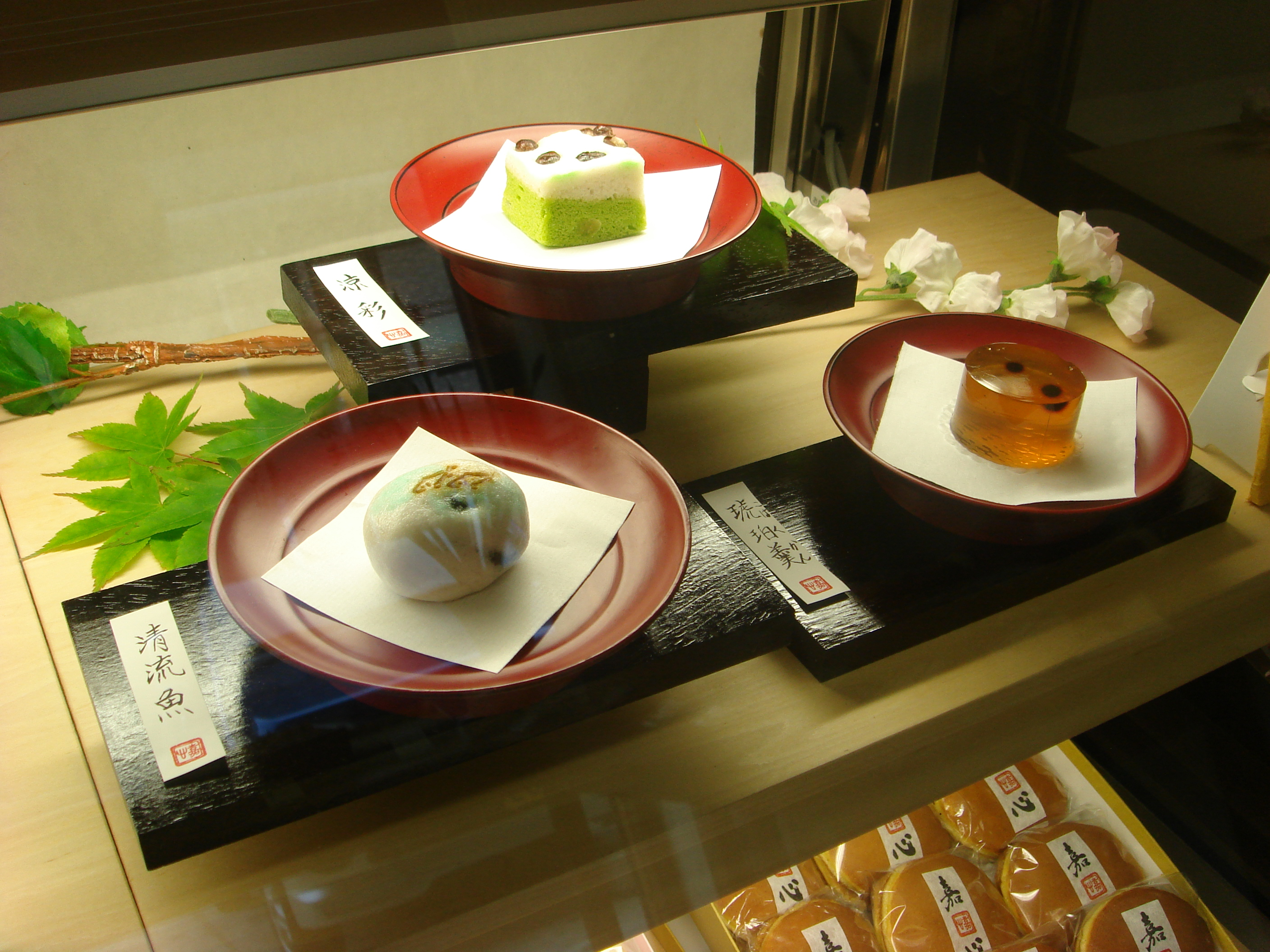
Wagashi in a storefront in Sapporo, Japan

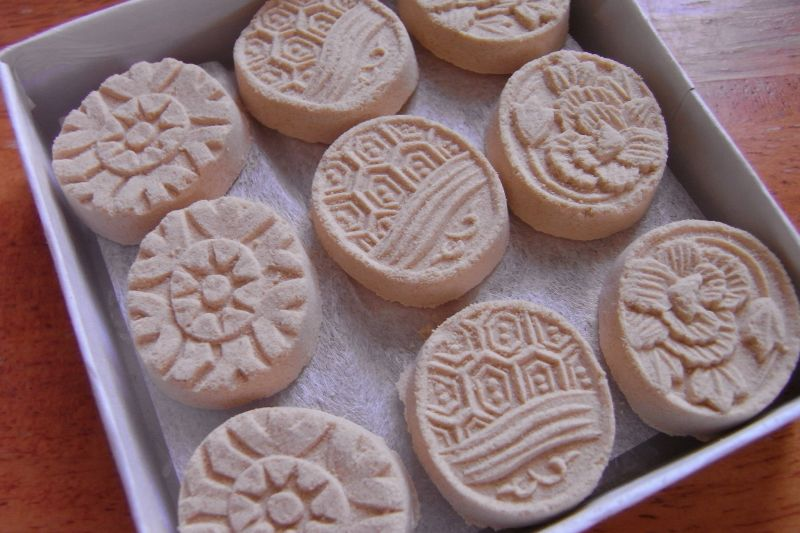
Higashi

Wagashi include:

- Amanattō: traditional confectionery made of adzuki or other beans, covered with refined sugar after simmering with sugar syrup and drying.
- Dango: a Japanese dumpling and sweet made from mochiko (rice flour),[1] related to mochi.
- Hanabiramochi: a Japanese sweet (wagashi), usually eaten at the beginning of the year.
- Higashi: a type of wagashi, which is dry and contains very little moisture, and thus keeps relatively longer than other kinds of wagashi.
- Hoshigaki: dried persimmon fruit.
- Imagawayaki: also known as Taikoyaki, is a round Taiyaki and fillings are same.
- Kakigōri: shaved ice with syrup topping.
- Kompeito: crystal sugar candy.
- Manjū: sticky rice surrounding a sweet bean center.
- Matsunoyuki: a wagashi that resembles a pine tree dusted with snow.
- Mochi: steamed sweet rice pounded into a solid, sticky, and somewhat translucent mass.
- Oshiruko: a warm, sweet red bean (an) soup with mochi: rice cake.
- Uirō: a steamed cake made of rice flour.
- Taiyaki: a fried, fish-shaped cake, usually with a sweet filling such as a red bean paste.
- Namagashi: a type of wagashi, which is a general term for snacks used in the Japanese tea ceremony.

=== Old-fashioned Japanese-style sweets (dagashi, 駄菓子) ===
Dagashi include:

- Karume-yaki: Brown sugar cake that is also called "baked caramel".
- Sōsu senbei: Thin Senbei (rice crackers) eaten with brown sauce.
- Mizuame: Sticky liquid sugar candy.

=== Western-style sweets (yōgashi, 洋菓子) ===
Yogashi are Western-style sweets, but in Japan are typically very light or spongy.

- Kasutera: "Castella" Iberian-style sponge cake
- Mirukurepu: "mille feuilles": a layered crepe that literally means "one thousand leaves" in French.

=== Sweets bread (kashi pan, 菓子パン) ===
Kashi pan include:

- Anpan: bread with sweet bean paste in the center
- Melonpan: a large, round bun which is a combination of regular dough beneath cookie dough. It occasionally contains a melon-flavored cream, though traditionally it is called melon bread because of its general shape resembling that of a melon (not due to any melon flavor).
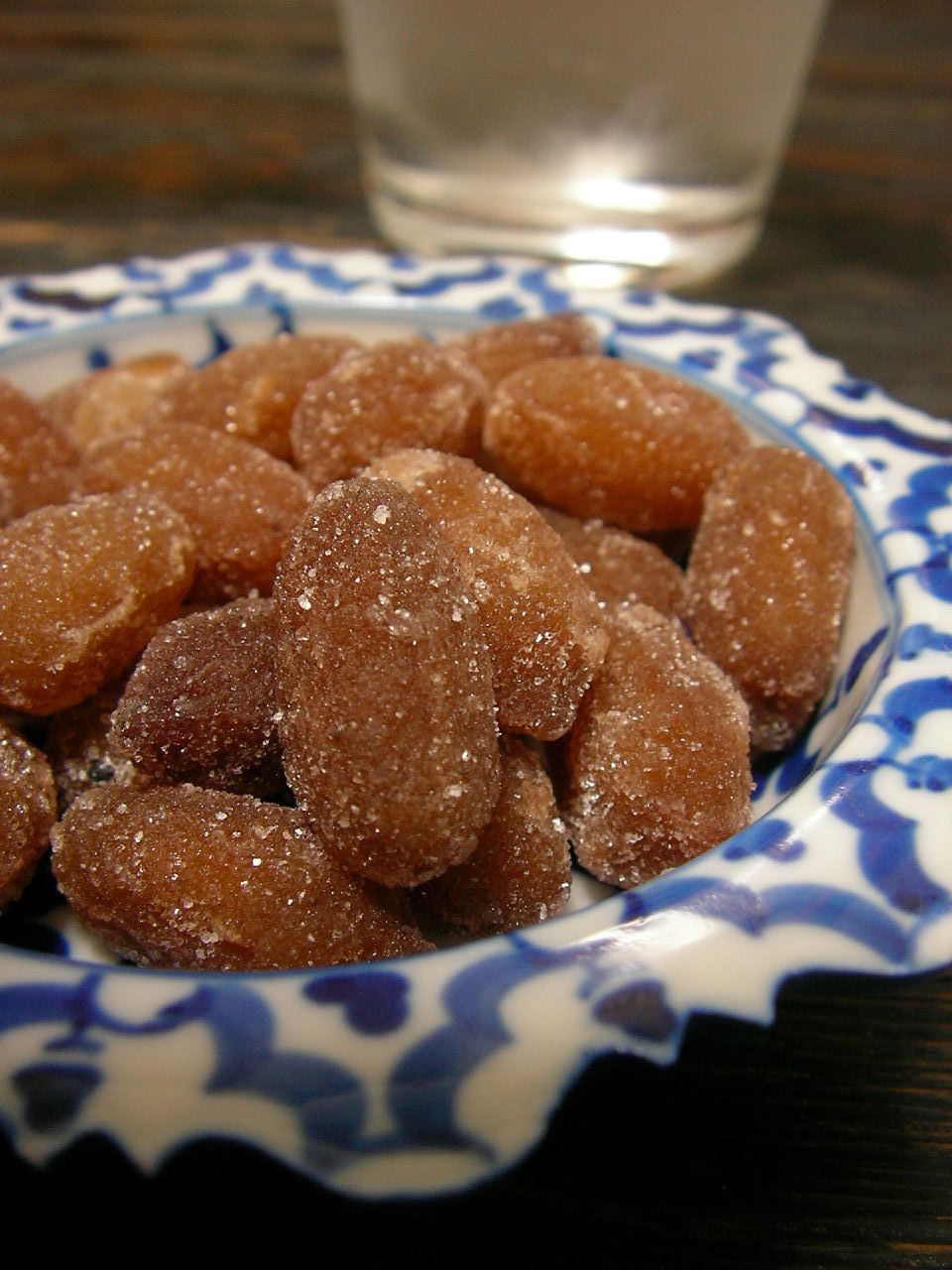
Peanut amanattō

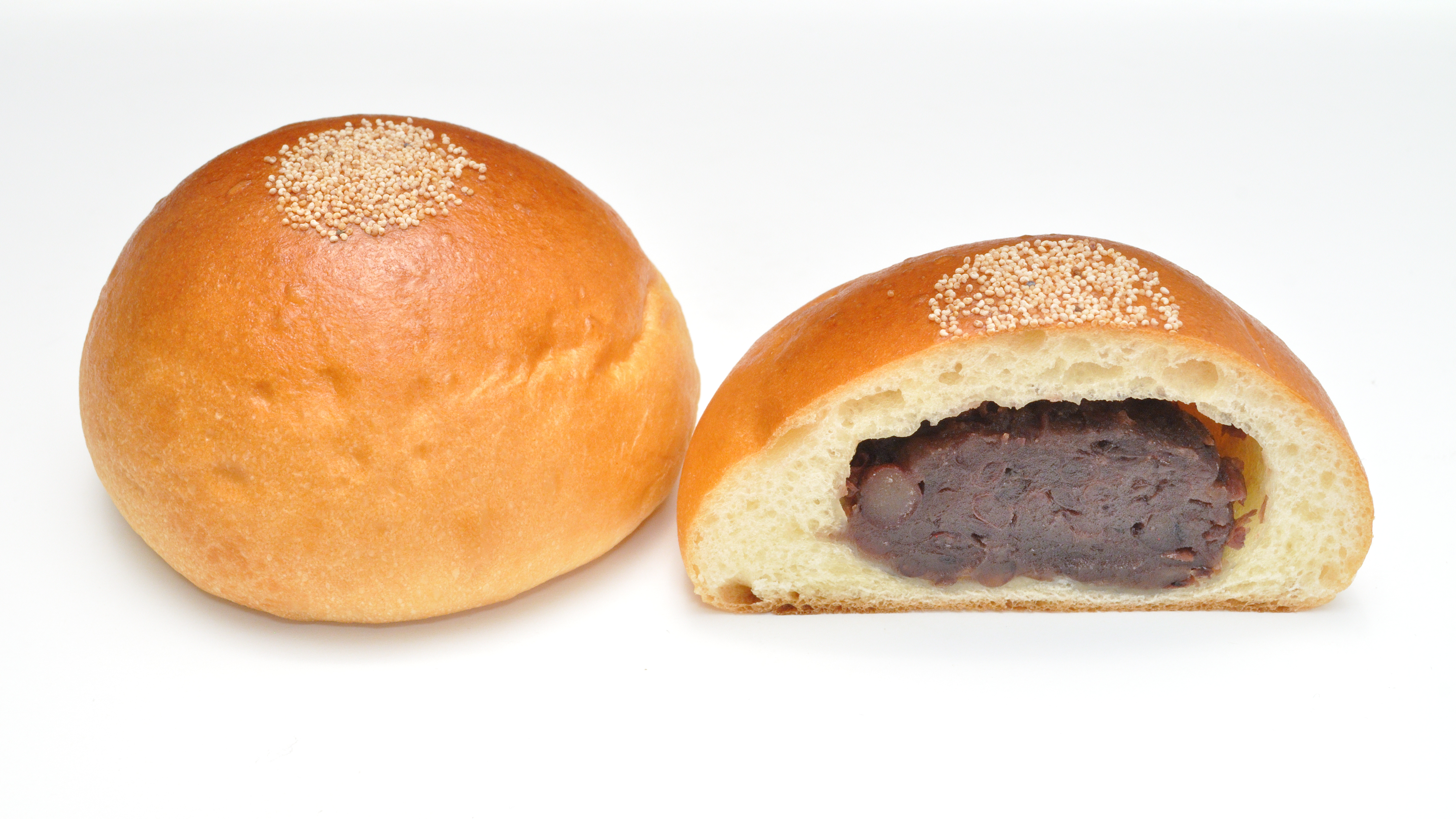
Anpan

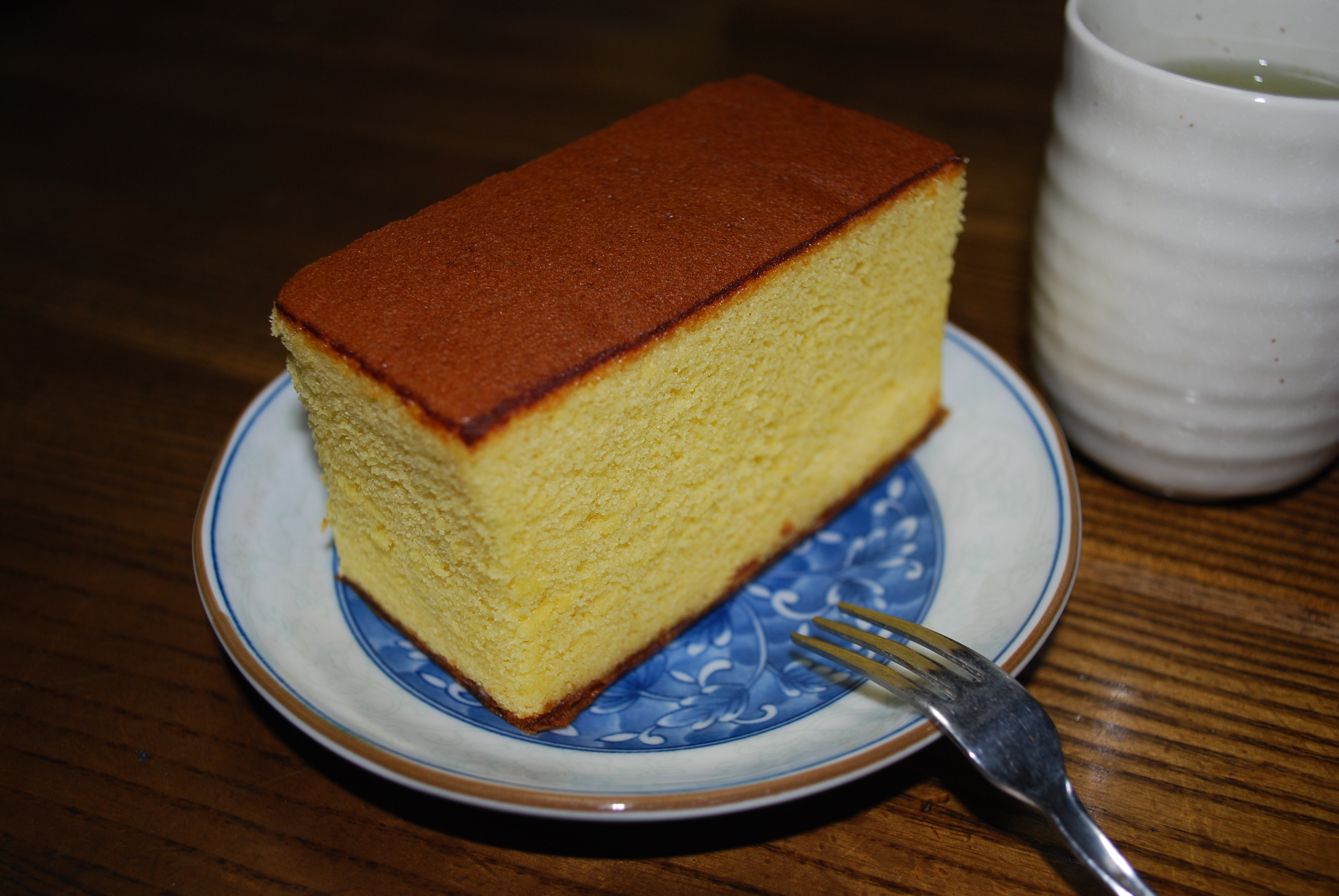
Castella

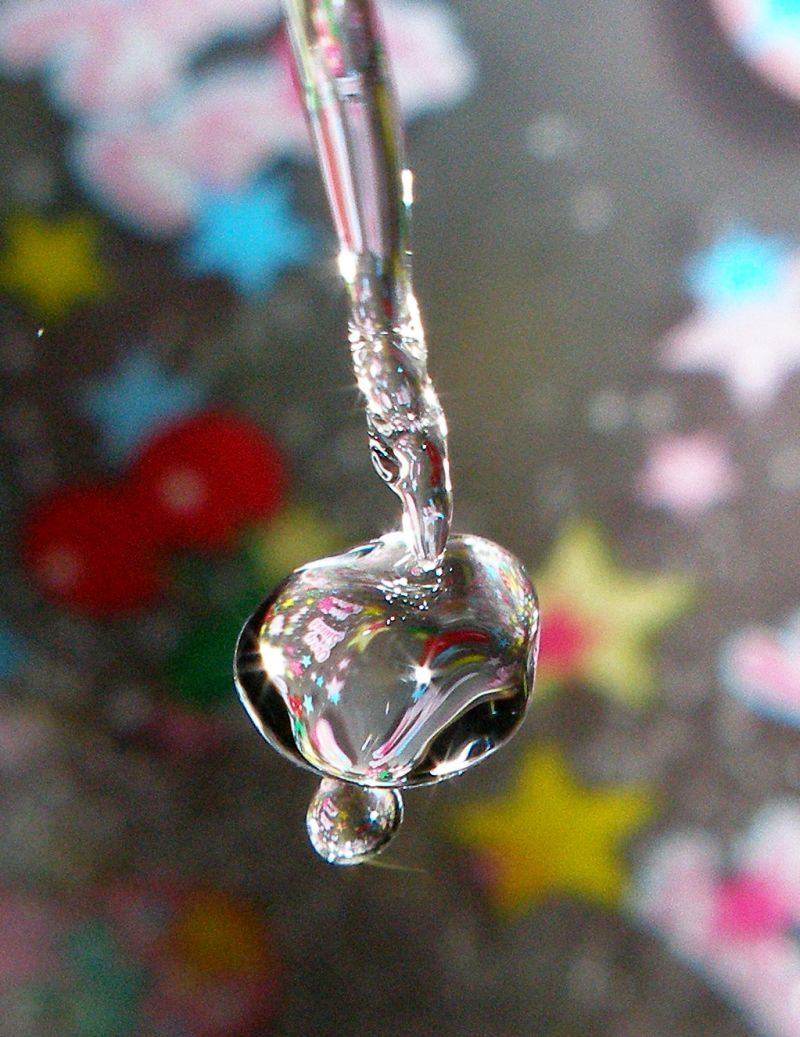
Mizuame

=== Other snacks ===
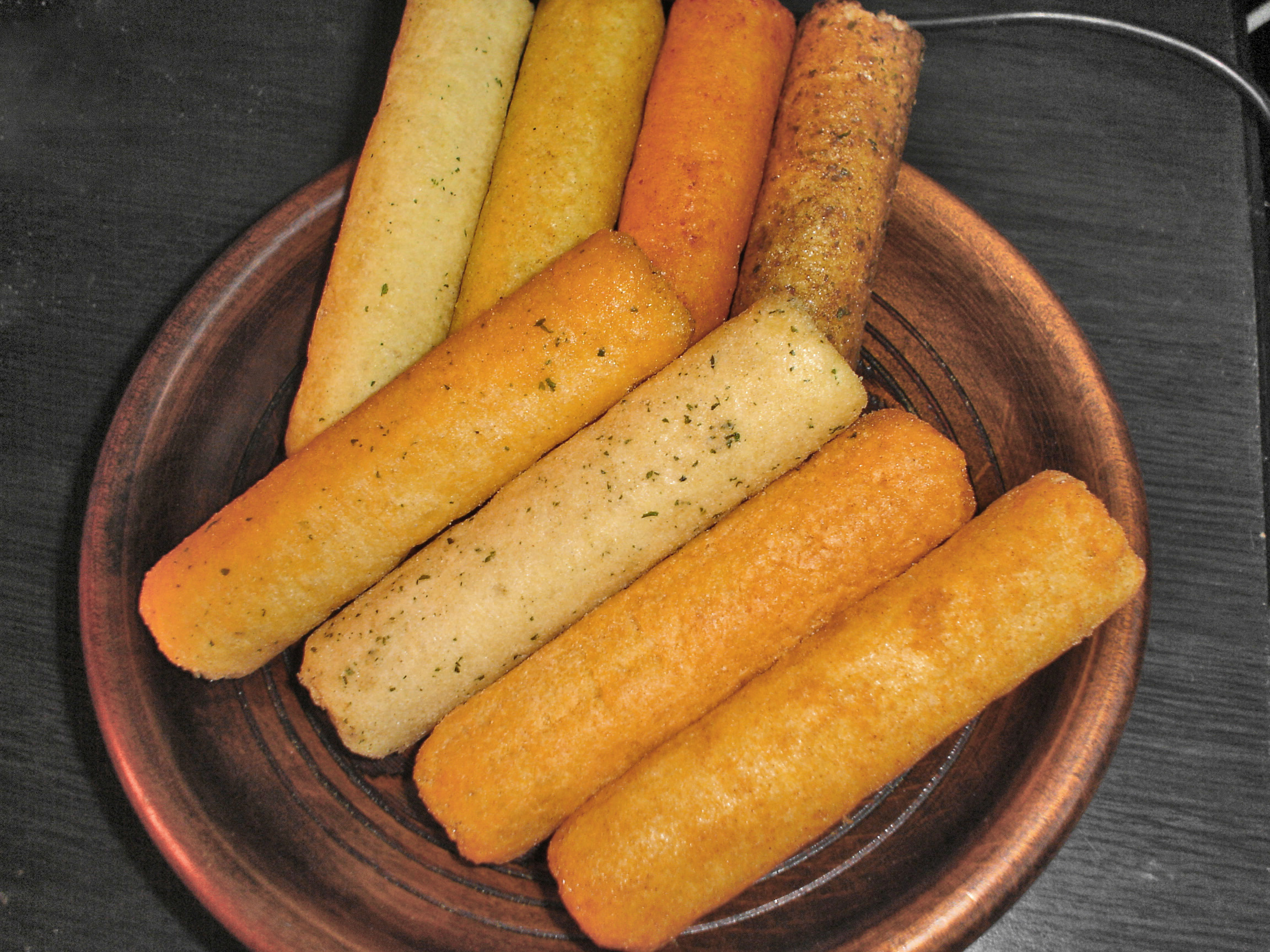
Umaibō

Snacks include:

- Azuki Ice - vanilla flavored ice cream with sweet azuki beans
- Koara no māchi
- Umai Bō - puffed corn food with various flavors
- Pocky
- Hello Panda
- Hi-chew
- Ice cream - usual flavors such as vanilla and chocolate are the most common. Distinctly Japanese ones include Matcha Ice (green tea ice cream), less common ones include Goma (black sesame seed) and sweet potato flavors.

== Tea and other drinks ==
=== Tea and non-alcoholic beverages ===
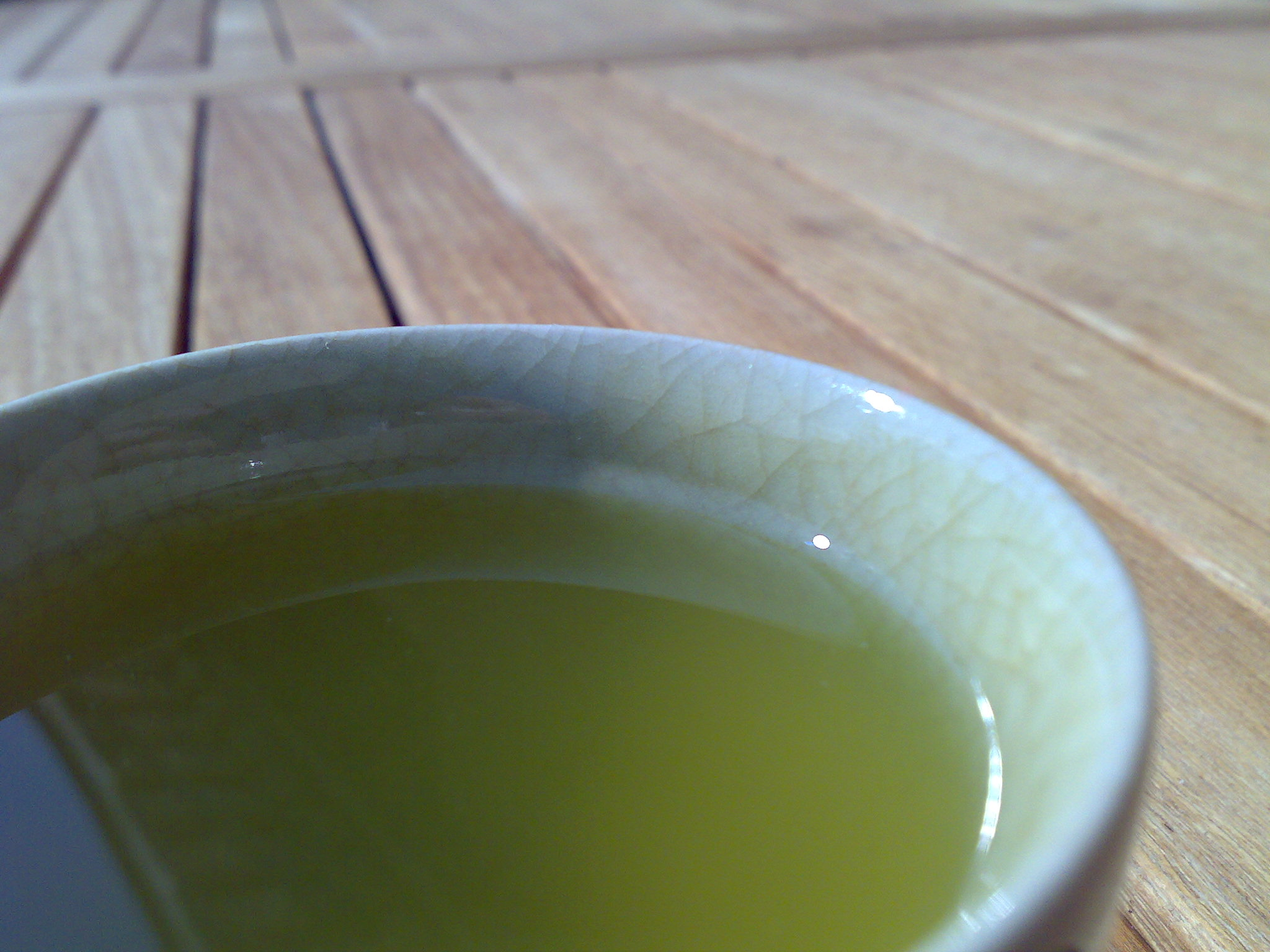
Japanese green tea

- Amazake
- Genmaicha is green tea combined with roasted brown rice.
- Gyokuro: Gyokuro leaves are shaded from direct sunlight for approximately 3 weeks before the spring harvest. Removing direct sunlight in this way enhances the proportions of flavonols, amino acids, sugars, and other substances that provide tea aroma and taste. After harvesting the leaves are rolled and dried naturally. Gyokuro is slightly sweeter than sencha and is famous for its crisp, clean taste. Major growing areas include Uji, Kyōto and Shizuoka prefecture.
- Hōjicha: green tea roasted over charcoal
- Konbu-cha: specifically the tea poured with Kombu giving rich flavor in monosodium glutamate.
- Kukicha is a blend of green tea made of stems, stalks, and twigs.
- Kuzuyu is a thick herbal tea made with kudzu starch.
- Matcha is powdered green tea. (Green tea ice cream is flavored with matcha, not ocha.)
- Mugicha is barley tea, served chilled during summer.
- Sakurayu is an herbal tea made with pickled cherry blossoms.
- Sencha is steam treated green tea leaves that are then dried.
- Umecha is a tea drink with umeboshi, which provides a refreshing sourness.
- Kuwacha is a noncaffeinated tea made with white mulberry leaves.

==== Soft drinks ====
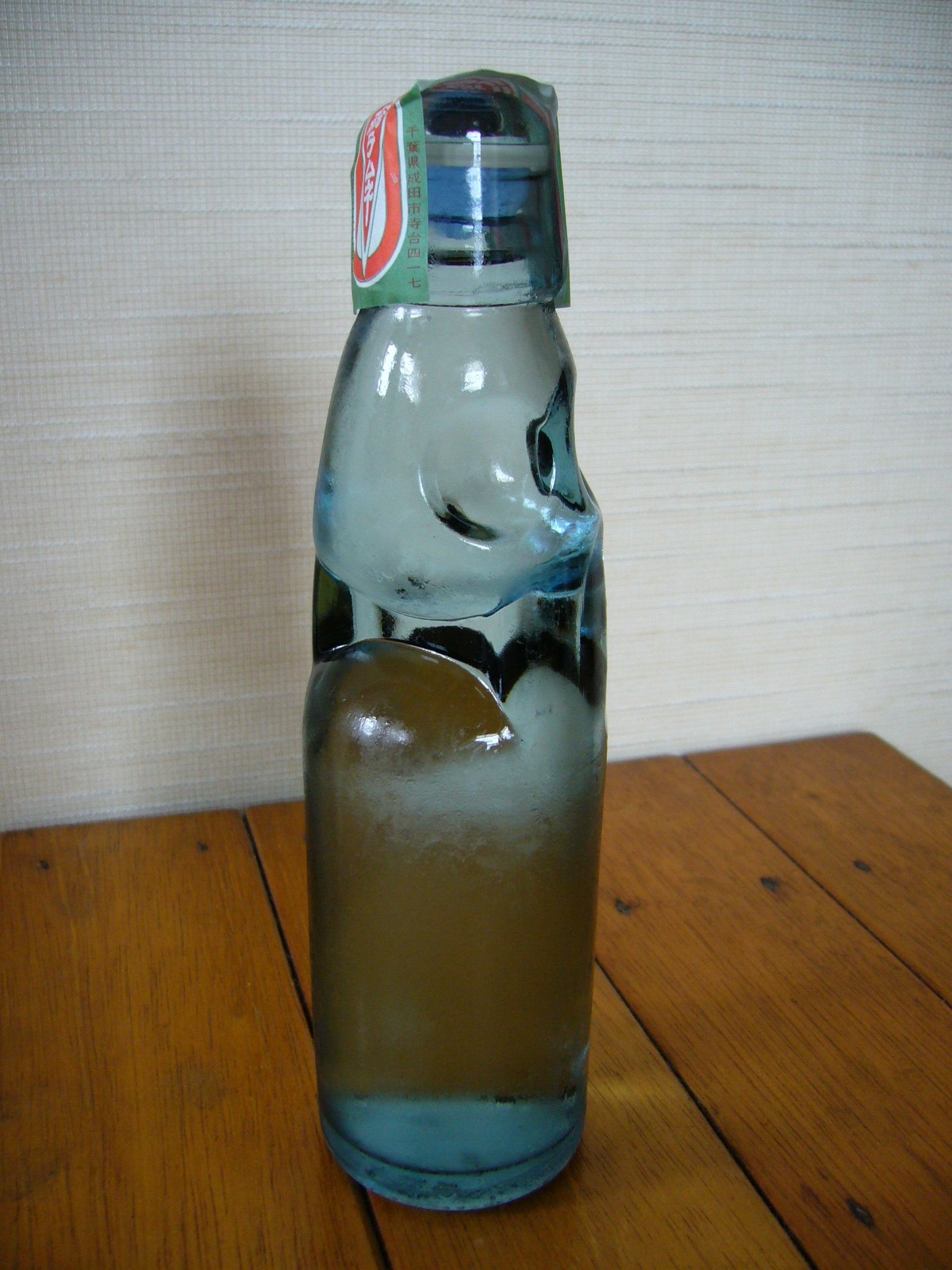
Lemonade-flavored Ramune

- Calpis
- C.C. Lemon
- Mitsuya Cider
- Oronamin C Drink
- Pocari Sweat
- Qoo
- Ramune
- Yakult

== Alcoholic beverages ==
Sake (酒) is a rice wine that typically contains 12–20% alcohol and is made by a double fermentation of rice. Kōji fungus is first used to ferment the rice starch into sugar. Regular brewing yeast is used in the second fermentation to make alcohol. At traditional meals, it is considered an equivalent to rice and is not simultaneously taken with other rice-based dishes. Side dishes for sake is particularly called sakana (肴, 酒菜), or otsumami おつまみ or ate あて.

Shōchū is a distilled beverage, most commonly made from barley, sweet potatoes, or rice. Typically, it contains 25% alcohol by volume.

- Awamori (泡盛)
- Sake (酒, 日本酒)
- Shōchū (焼酎)
- Umeshu (梅酒)
- Japanese beer (ビール) - leading brands are Sapporo, Asahi and Kirin
- Japanese whisky - Suntory and Nikka Whisky Distilling are the leading distilleries
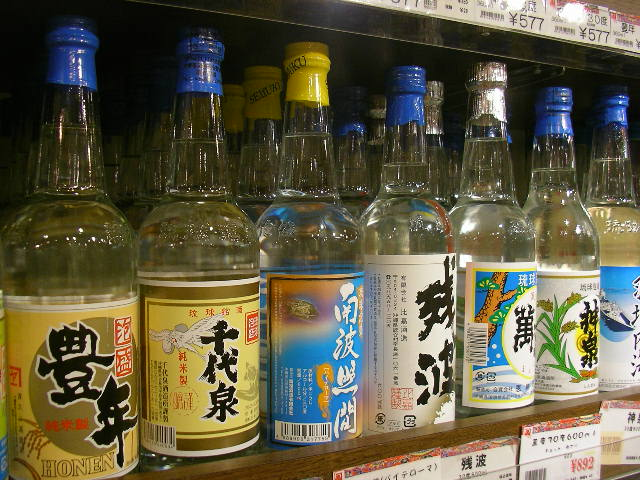
Awamori is an alcoholic beverage indigenous to and unique to Okinawa, Japan.

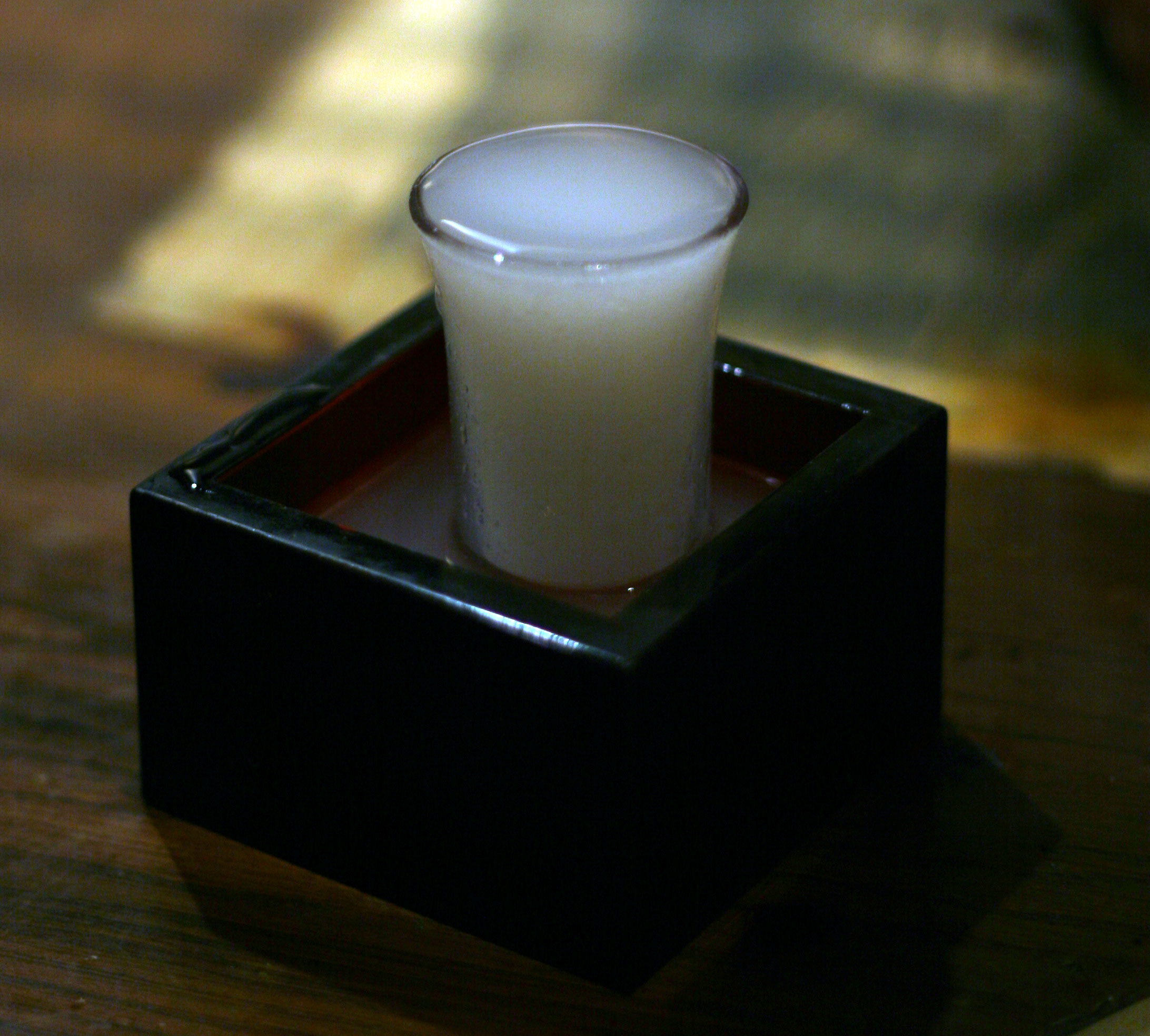
Nigori is an unfiltered sake, presented here in an overflowing glass within a traditional wooden box cup, symbolizing abundance.

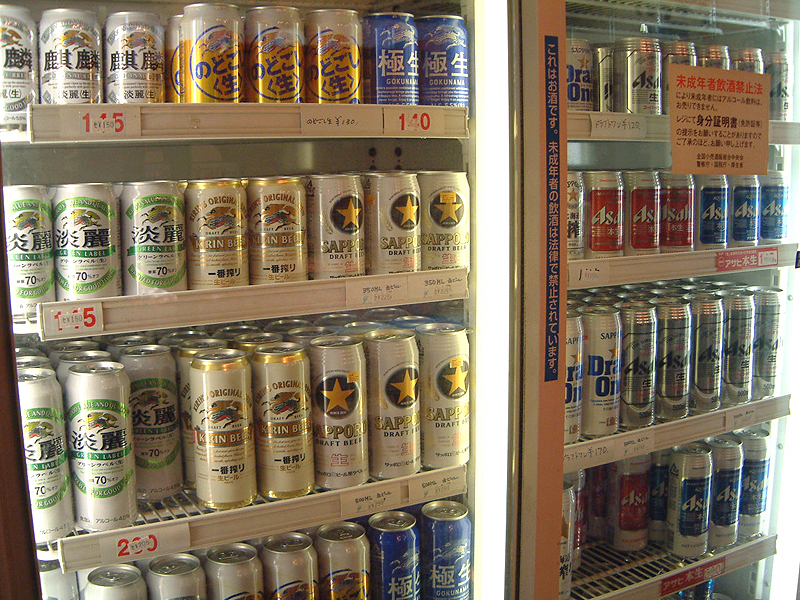
Japanese beer

Barrels of sake, a traditional Japanese alcoholic drink, on display as an offering at an Itsukushima Shrine

== Imported and adapted foods ==
Japan has incorporated imported food from across the world (mostly from Asia, Europe and to a lesser extent the Americas), and have historically adapted many to make them their own.

=== Foods imported from Portugal in the 16th century ===
- Kasutera — sponge cake, originating in Nagasaki.
- Konpeitō — star shaped sugar candy, the name comes from the Portuguese word confeito (comfit).
- Pan — bread, introduced from Portugal (the Portuguese for bread is pão). Japanese bread crumbs, panko, have been popularized by cooking shows.
- Tempura — so thoroughly adopted that its foreign roots are unknown to most people, including many Japanese. As such, it is considered washoku (和食, native food).

=== Yōshoku ===
Yōshoku (洋食) is a style of Western-influenced food.

- Breaded seafood or vegetables (furai, フライ, derived from "fry"), and breaded meat (katsuretsu, カツレツ, derived from "cutlet" and often contracted to katsu), are usually served with shredded cabbage and/or lettuce, Japanese Worcestershire or tonkatsu sauce and lemon. Tempura, a related dish, has been heavily modified since its introduction to Japan by use of batter and dashi-flavored dip, and is usually considered to be washoku.

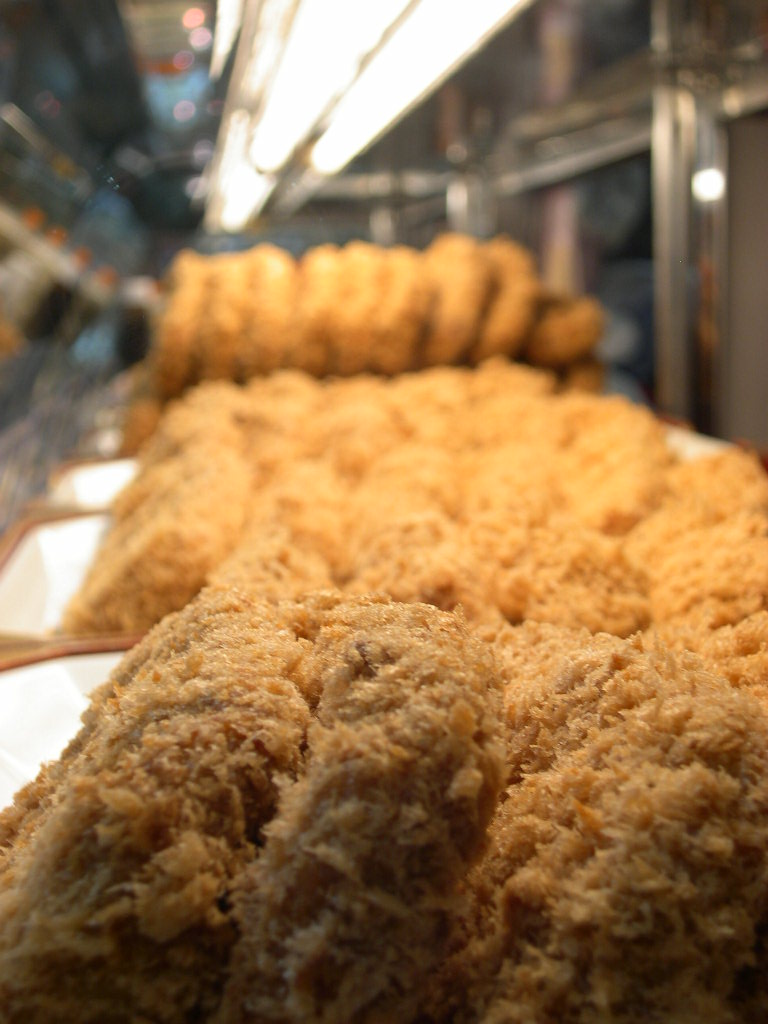
Korokke for sale at a Mitsukoshi food hall in Tokyo, Japan

- Kaki furai (カキフライ, 牡蠣フライ) - breaded oyster
- Ebi furai (エビフライ, 海老フライ) - breaded shrimp
- Korokke ("croquette" コロッケ) - breaded mashed potato and minced meat patties. When white sauce is added, it is called cream korokke. Other ingredients such as crab meat, shrimp, or mushrooms are also used instead of minced meat which are called kani-, ebi-, or kinoko-cream korokke, respectively.
- Tonkatsu, Menchi katsu, chicken katsu, beef katsu, kujira katsu - breaded and deep-fried pork, minced meat patties, chicken, beef, and whale, respectively.

- Japanese curry - rice - imported in the 19th century by way of the United Kingdom and adapted by Japanese Navy chefs. One of the most popular food items in Japan today. Eaten with a spoon. Curry is often eaten with pickled vegetables called fukujinzuke or rakkyo
  - Curry Pan - deep fried bread with Japanese curry sauce inside. The pirozhki of Russia was remodeled, and Curry bread was made.
  - Curry udon - is a hot noodle dish where the soup is made of Japanese curry and dashi. May also include meat or vegetables.

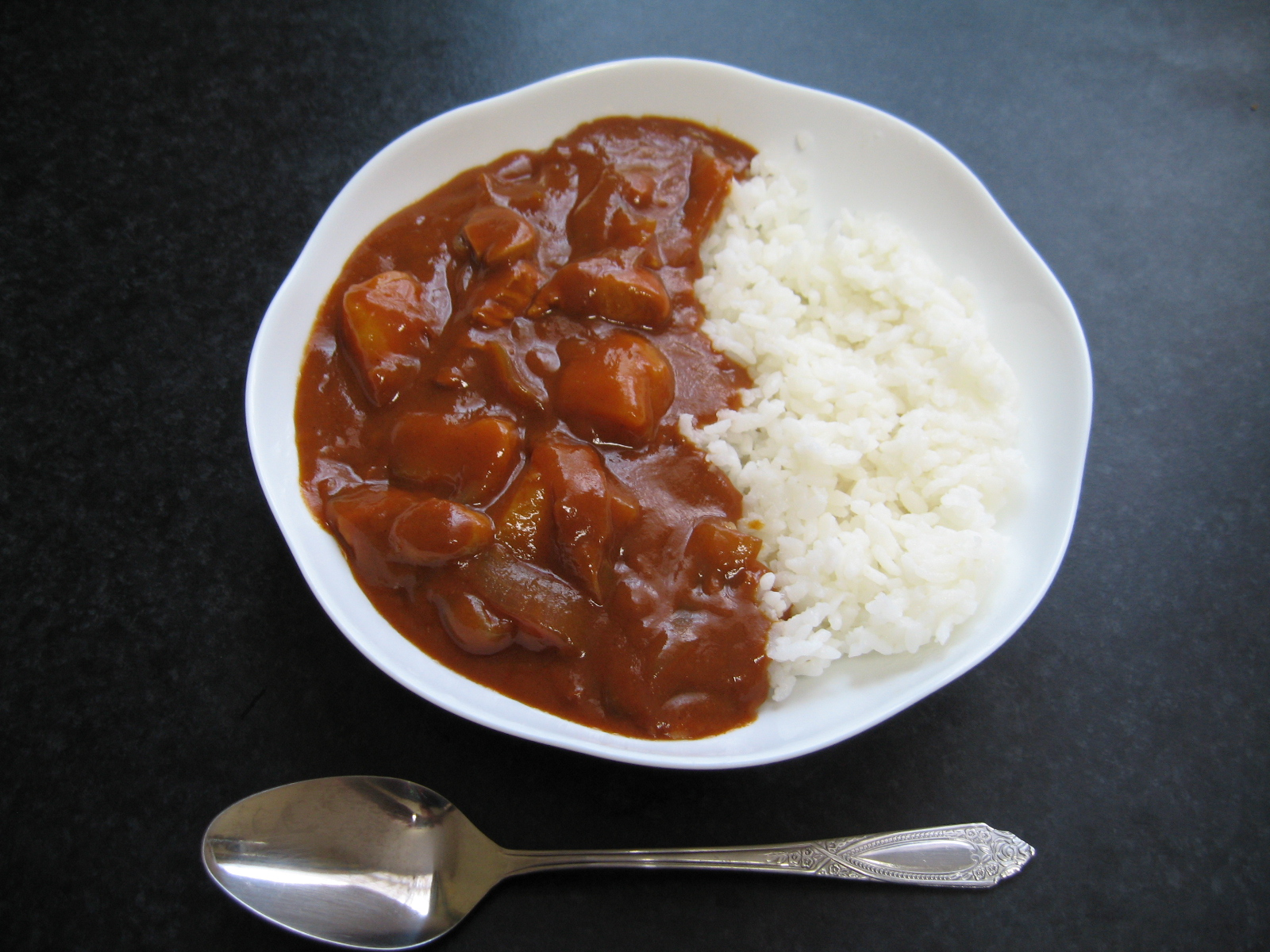
Hayashi rice

- Hayashi rice (ハヤシライス) - beef and onions stewed in a red-wine sauce and served on rice
- Nikujaga - soy sauce-flavored meat and potato stew that has been made in Japan to the extent that it is now considered washoku, but again originates from 19th century Japanese Navy chefs adapting beef stews of the Royal Navy.
- Omu raisu - ketchup-flavored rice wrapped in omelet.
- Toruko rice ("Turkish rice") - tonkatsu cutlet, spaghetti and pilaf rice.

Other items were popularized after the war:

- Hamburg steak - a ground beef patty, usually mixed with breadcrumbs and fried chopped onions, served with a side of white rice and vegetables. Often accompanied with demiglace sauce. Popular post-war food item served at homes. Sometimes eaten with a fork.

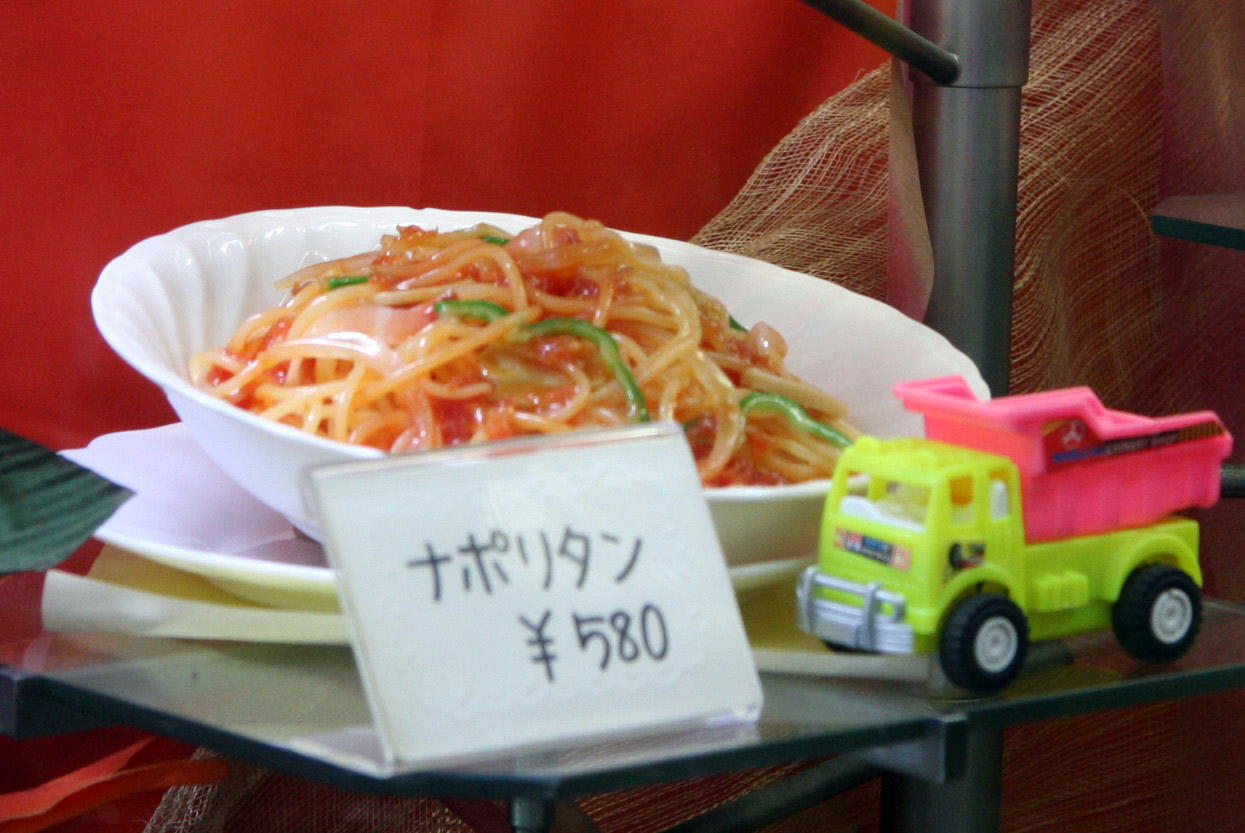
Fake food of naporitan in display window of a restaurant in Japan

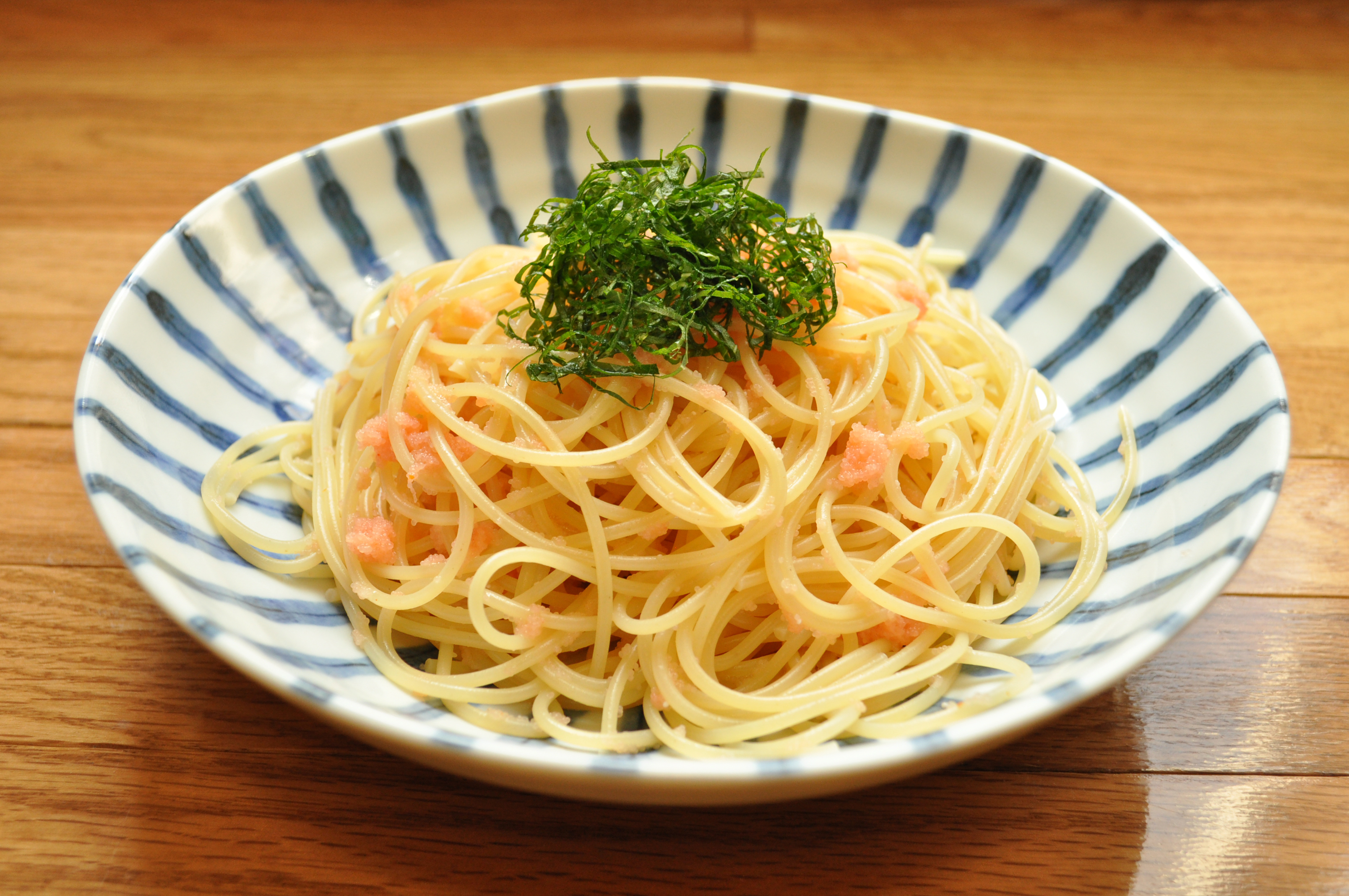
Tarako spaghetti (たらこスパゲッティ)

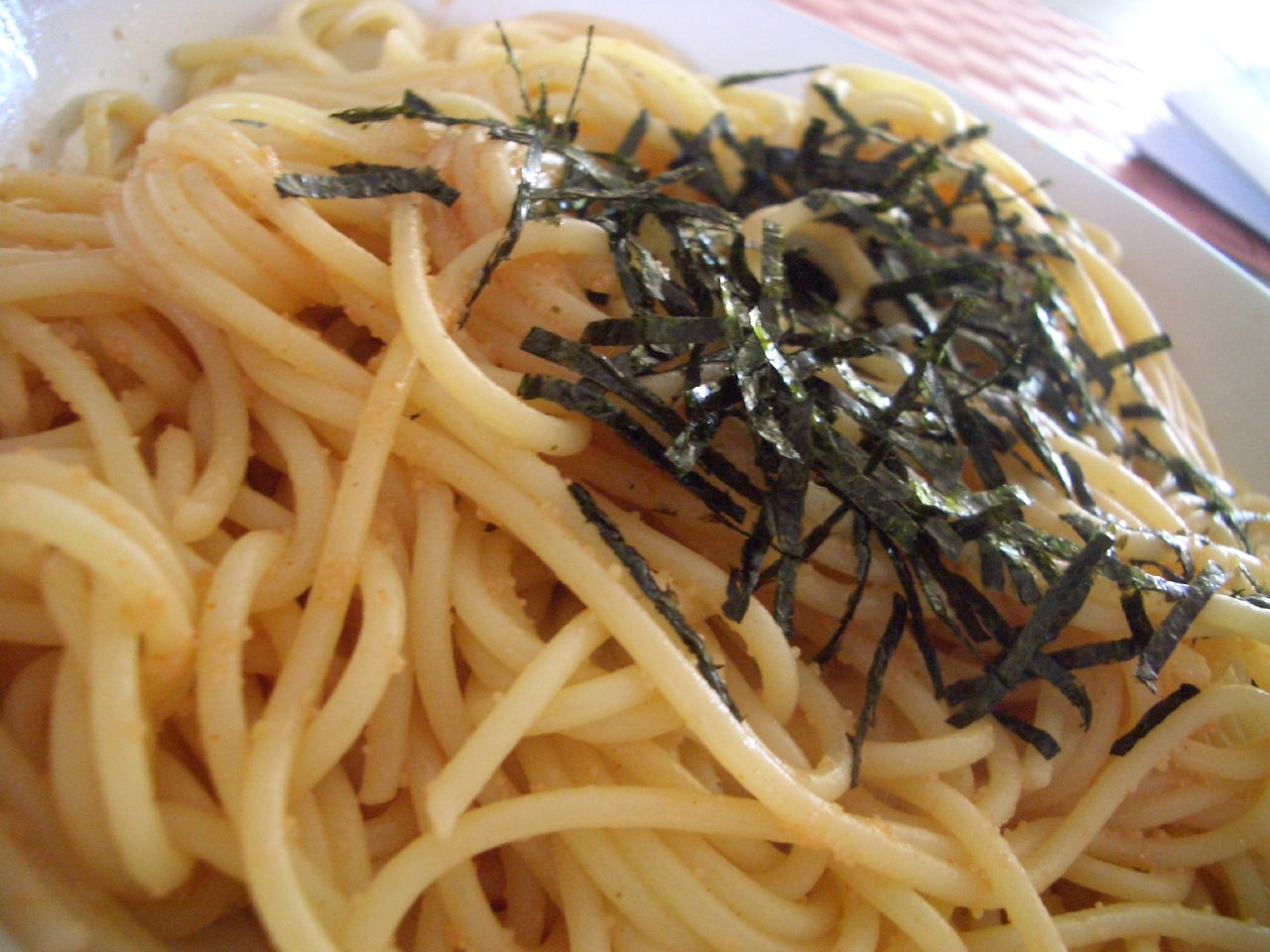
Mentaiko spaghetti (明太子スパゲッティ)

- Spaghetti - Japanese versions include:
  - with tomato ketchup, wieners, sliced onion and green pepper (called "naporitan" or "napolitan")
  - with mentaiko sauce topped with nori seaweed (tarako spaghetti, たらこスパゲッティ) (mentaiko spaghetti, 明太子スパゲッティ)
  - with Japanese curry
- Pizza - The popular American pizza companies Domino's, Pizza Hut and Shakey's all operate in Japan, but Japanese brands such as Aoki's and Pizza-La are higher-grossing and famous for catering to Japanese taste. Many pizza chains offer seasonal toppings. Japanese versions include:
  - with corn
  - with shrimp, squid, or other seafood
  - with mayonnaise, white sauce or Pesto basil sauce
  - with potato or eggplant
  - with Galbi beef or teriyaki chicken
  - with hard-boiled eggs
  - with macaroni, wieners or other prepared foods

=== Other homegrown cuisine of foreign origin ===
- Japanese American cuisine
  - Burgers have various variations in Japan. Domestic chains like MOS Burger and Freshness Burger cater to Japanese tastes with seasonal specials like Teriyaki Burgers and the kinpira rice burger.
- Korean cuisine
  - Kimchi from Korea is often served with Japanese Chinese cuisine, though the local variant may use thinner cabbage.
- Japanese Chinese cuisine
  - Gyoza are a very popular dish in Japan. Gyoza are the Japanese take on the Chinese dumplings with rich garlic flavor. Most often, they are seen in the crispy pan-fried form (potstickers), but they can be served boiled or even deep fried, as well.
  - Japanese-only "Chinese dishes" like ebi chili (shrimp in a tangy and slightly spicy sauce)
  - Mābō dōfu tends to be thinner than Chinese mapo doufu.
  - Nikuman, anman, butaman and the obscure negi-man are all varieties of mantou with fillings.
  - Ramen and related dishes such as champon and yaki soba
  - Yakisoba-pan is a sandwich with a filling that resembles chow mein noodles.
- Japanese English cuisine
  - Purin is a version of caramel custard.

=== Adaptations ===
- California roll - invented in Canada, then first introduced in California.
- Spam musubi - a snack from Hawaii resembling onigiri, made with Spam

== Seasonings ==
Many Japanese foods are prepared using one or more of the following:

- Kombu (kelp), katsuobushi (flakes of cured skipjack tuna, sometimes referred to as bonito) and niboshi (dried baby sardines) are often used to make dashi stock.
- Negi (Welsh onion), onions, garlic, nira (Chinese chives), rakkyō (Allium chinense) (a type of scallion).
- Sesame seeds, sesame oil, sesame salt (gomashio), furikake, walnuts or peanuts to dress.
- Shōyu (soy sauce), dashi, mirin, sugar, rice vinegar, miso, sake.
- Wasabi (and imitation wasabi from horseradish), karashi (hot mustard), red pepper, ginger, shiso (perilla or beefsteak plant) leaves, sansho, citrus peel, and honeywort (called mitsuba).
- A citrus fruit called yuzu is also a frequent condiment, mashed up into a relish, sold as yuzukoshō and is blended with pepper/chili and salt. Yuzukoshō is eaten with many dishes, adding a flavorful kick to broth/soup items such as oden, nikujaga, tonjiru, udon as well as other dishes. Yuzu is also seen to flavor teas, jams or zeri (jelly), and any number of sweets from yuzu-an (a type of bean paste) to yuzu-hachimitsu (yuzu-honey).

Less traditional, but widely used ingredients include:

- Monosodium glutamate, which is often used by chefs and food companies as a cheap flavor enhancer. It may be used as a substitute for kombu, which is a traditional source of free glutamate
- Japanese-style Worcestershire sauce, often known as simply "sauce", thicker and fruitier than the original, is commonly used as a table condiment for okonomiyaki (お好み焼き), tonkatsu (トンカツ), croquette ("korokke", コロッケ) and the like.
- Japanese mayonnaise is used with salads, okonomiyaki (お好み焼き), yaki soba (焼きそば) and sometimes mixed with wasabi or soy sauce.

== See also ==
- List of Japanese condiments
- List of Japanese cooking utensils
- List of Japanese desserts and sweets
- List of Japanese ingredients
- List of Japanese soups and stews
