= List of Japanese desserts and sweets =

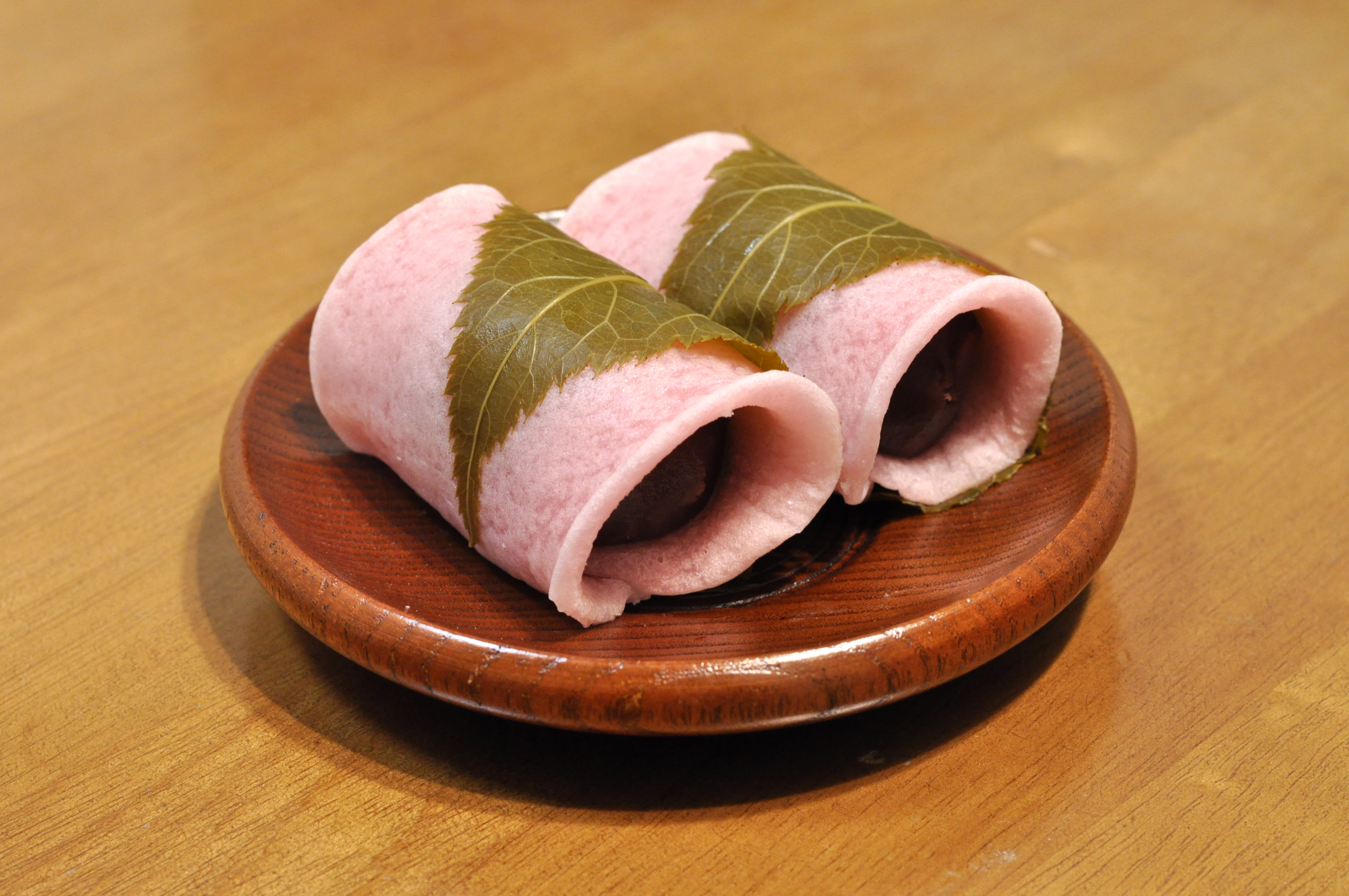
Sakuramochi

The Japanese had been making desserts for centuries before sugar was widely available in Japan. Many desserts commonly available in Japan can be traced back hundreds of years. In Japanese cuisine, traditional sweets are known as wagashi, and are made using ingredients such as red bean paste and mochi. Though many desserts and sweets date back to the Edo period (1603–1867) and Meiji period (1868–1911), many modern-day sweets and desserts originating from Japan also exist.

However, the definition of wagashi is ambiguous, and the line between wagashi and other types of Japanese confectionery is vague. For example, although the original kasutera (castella) was introduced from Portugal, it has been around for more than 400 years and has been modified to suit Japanese tastes, so it is classified as a wagashi. The raindrop cake, created in 2014, was developed by a wagashi shop as a derivative of shingen mochi and is recognized as a wagashi in Japan. In recent years, wagashi shops have developed and marketed many confections that are an eclectic mix of wagashi and Western confections, often referred to as "neo-wagashi".

== Japanese desserts ==
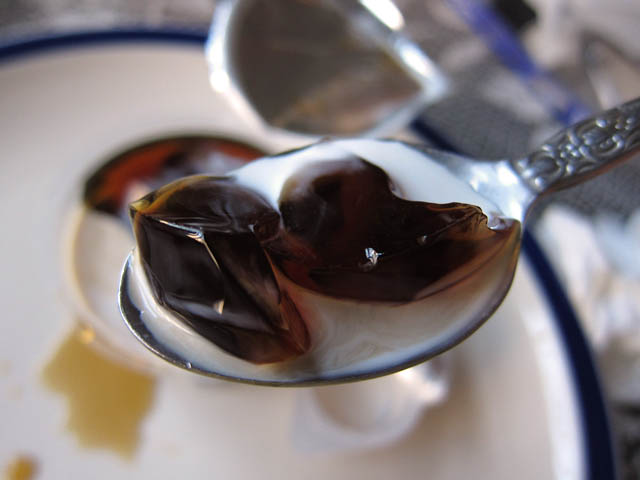
Coffee jelly is a popular gelatin dessert in Japan.

- Anpan
- Chinsuko
- Coffee jelly
- Green tea ice cream
- Hakuto jelly
- Kakigōri
- Melonpan
- Mochi ice cream
- Purin
- Sata andagi
- Tokyo Banana

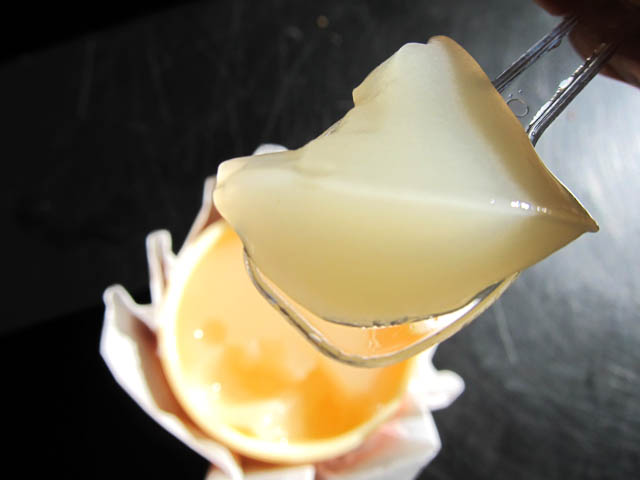
Hakuto jelly is a seasonal dessert in Japanese cuisine available in the summer.

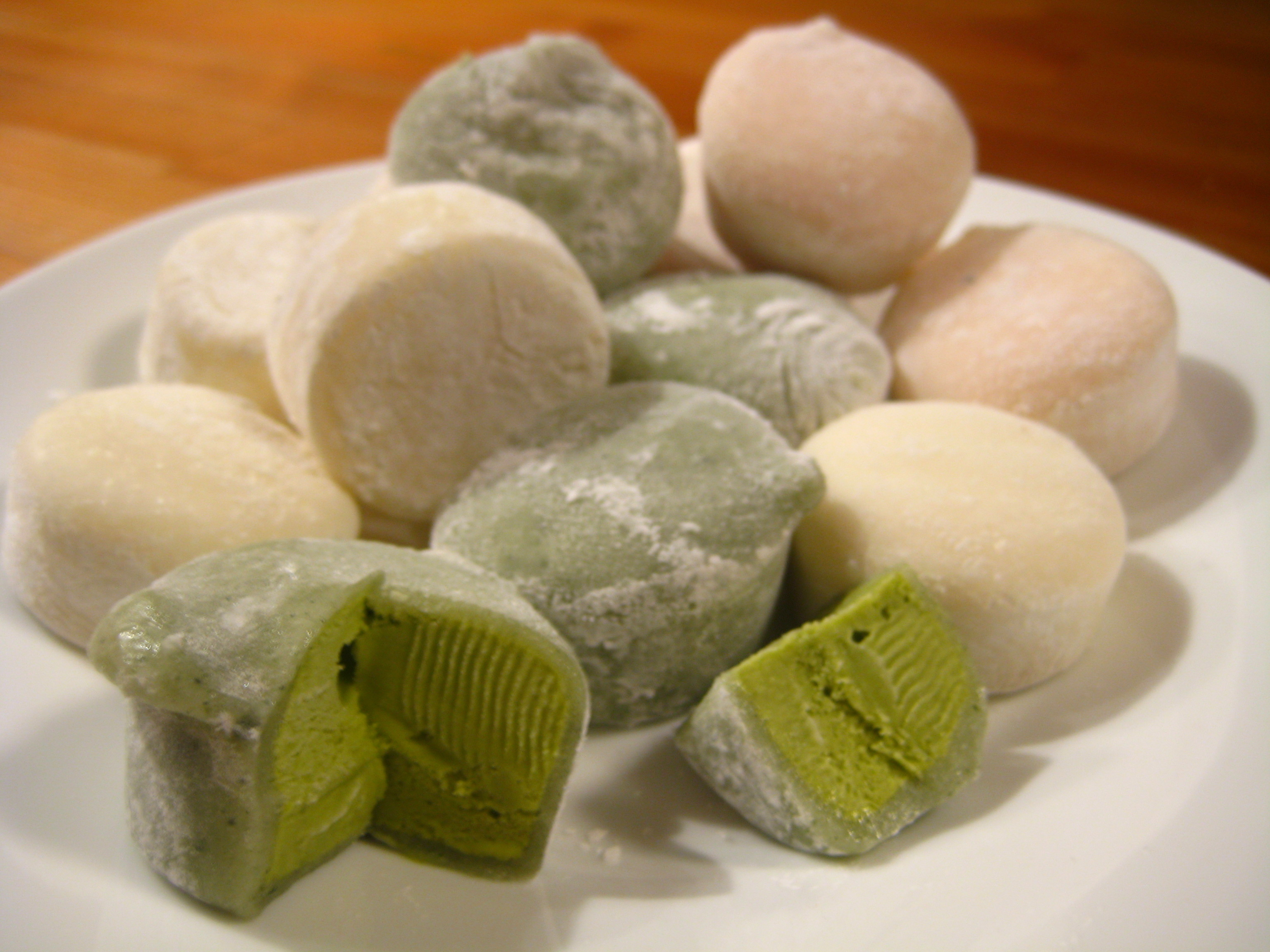
Mochi ice cream is a Japanese confection made from mochi (pounded sticky rice) with an ice cream filling.

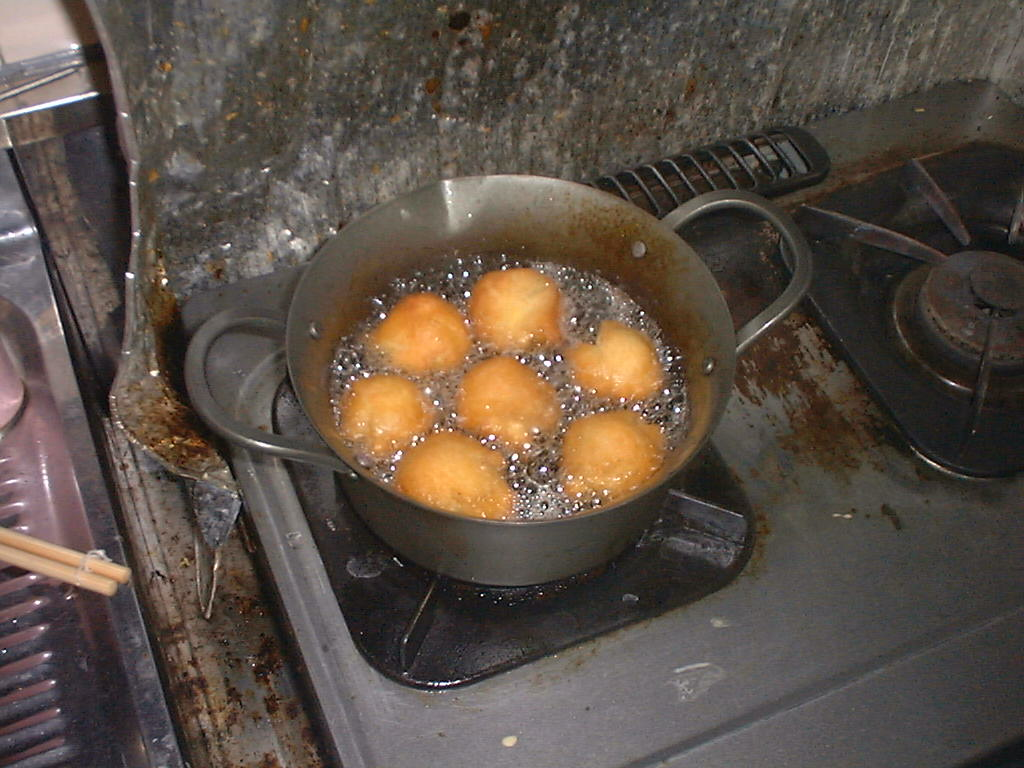
Sata andagi are sweet, deep-fried buns similar to doughnuts.

== Wagashi ==
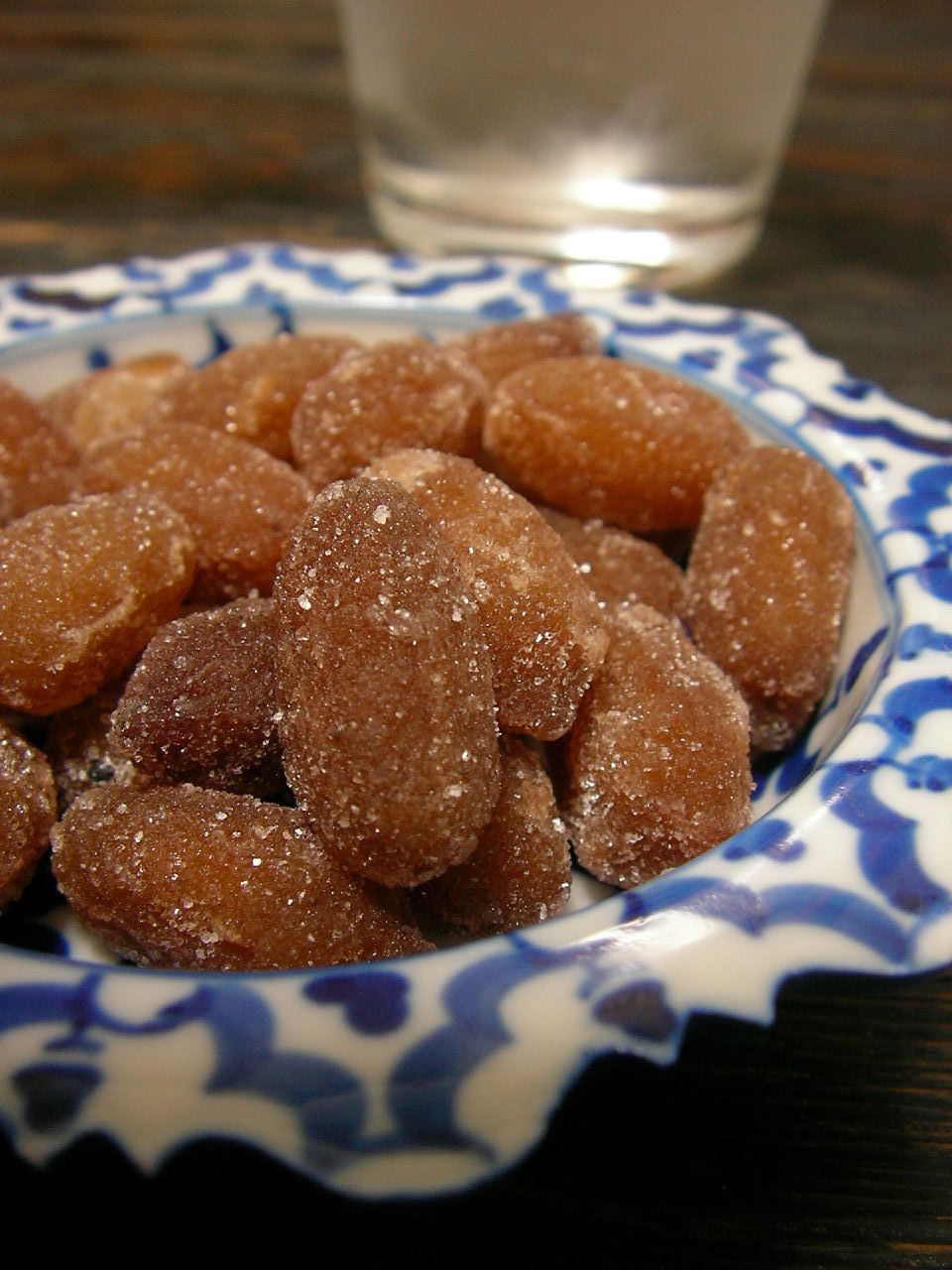
Peanut amanattō. Amanattō is a traditional Japanese confectionery that is made of azuki or other beans, covered with refined sugar after simmering with sugar syrup and drying.

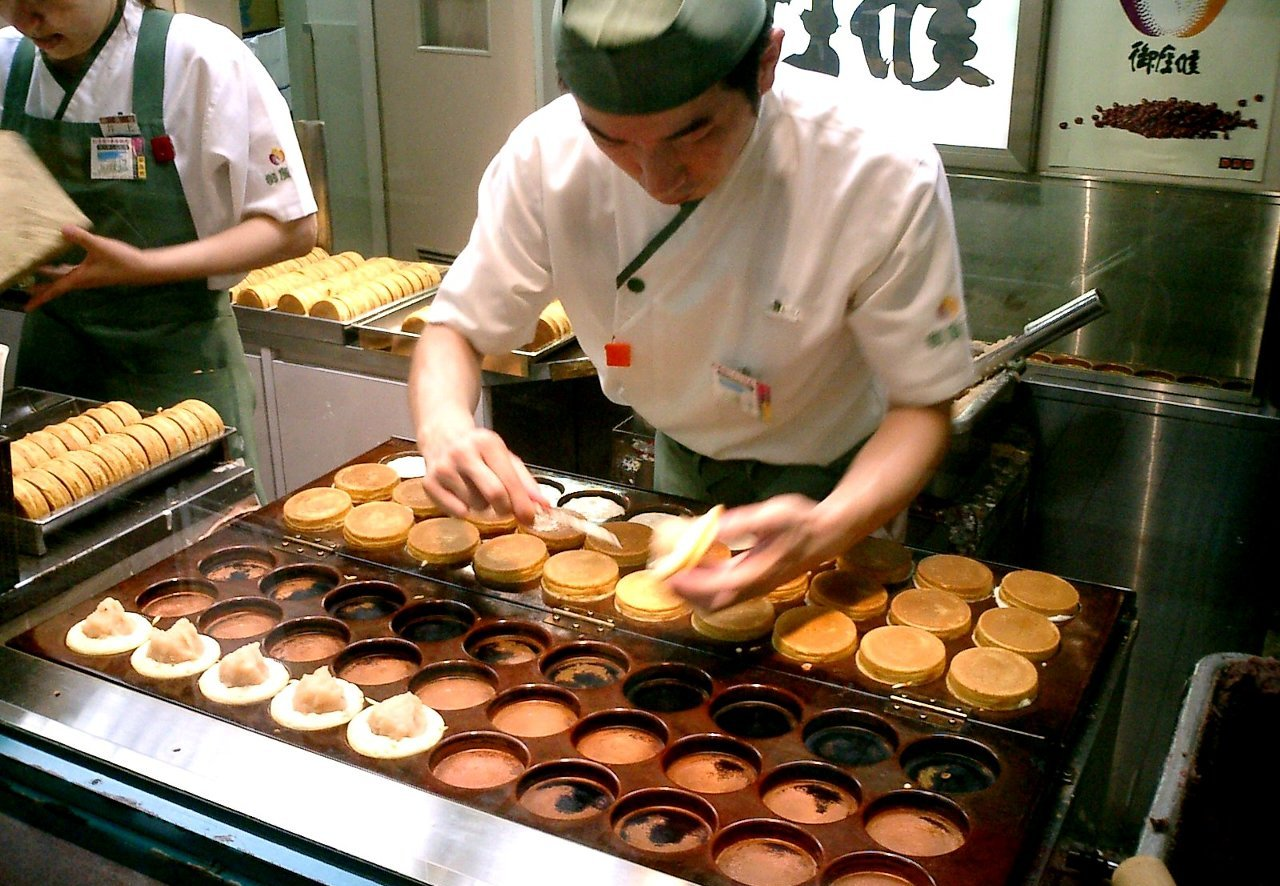
Imagawayaki (gozasōrō) being prepared in a store in Sannomiya, Kobe, Japan

Wagashi (和菓子) is a traditional Japanese confectionery which is often served with tea, especially the types made of mochi, anko (azuki bean paste), and fruits. Wagashi is typically made from plant ingredients. Wagashi are made in a wide variety of shapes and consistencies and with diverse ingredients and preparation methods. Wagashi are popular throughout Japan and each region has its specialties, but many products are regional or seasonal.

=== Types of wagashi ===
==== A ====
- Akumaki
- Amanattō
- Amezaiku
- Anmitsu
- Arare

==== B ====
- Botamochi
- Beika

==== C ====
- Castella
- Chitoseame

==== D ====
- Daifuku
- Dango
- Dorayaki

==== G ====
- Gokabou
- Gionbō
- Gyūhi

==== H ====
- Hanabiramochi
- Hatsuyumezuke
- Higashi
- Hishi mochi

==== I ====
- Imagawayaki

==== K ====
- Kanten
- Karintō
- Karukan
- Konpeitō
- Kusa mochi
- Kuzumochi
- Keiran Sōmen

==== M ====
- Manjū
- Mizuame
- Momiji manjū
- Monaka

==== N ====
- Namagashi
- Nerikiri

==== R ====
- Raindrop cake
- Red bean paste

==== S ====
- Sakuramochi
- Senbei
- Shiruko (red bean soup)
- Suama

==== T ====
- Taiyaki
- Tojiko mame
- Tokoroten

==== U ====
- Uirō

==== W ====
- Warabimochi
- Wasanbon

==== Y ====
- Yatsuhashi
- Yōkan
- Yubeshi

=== Gallery ===
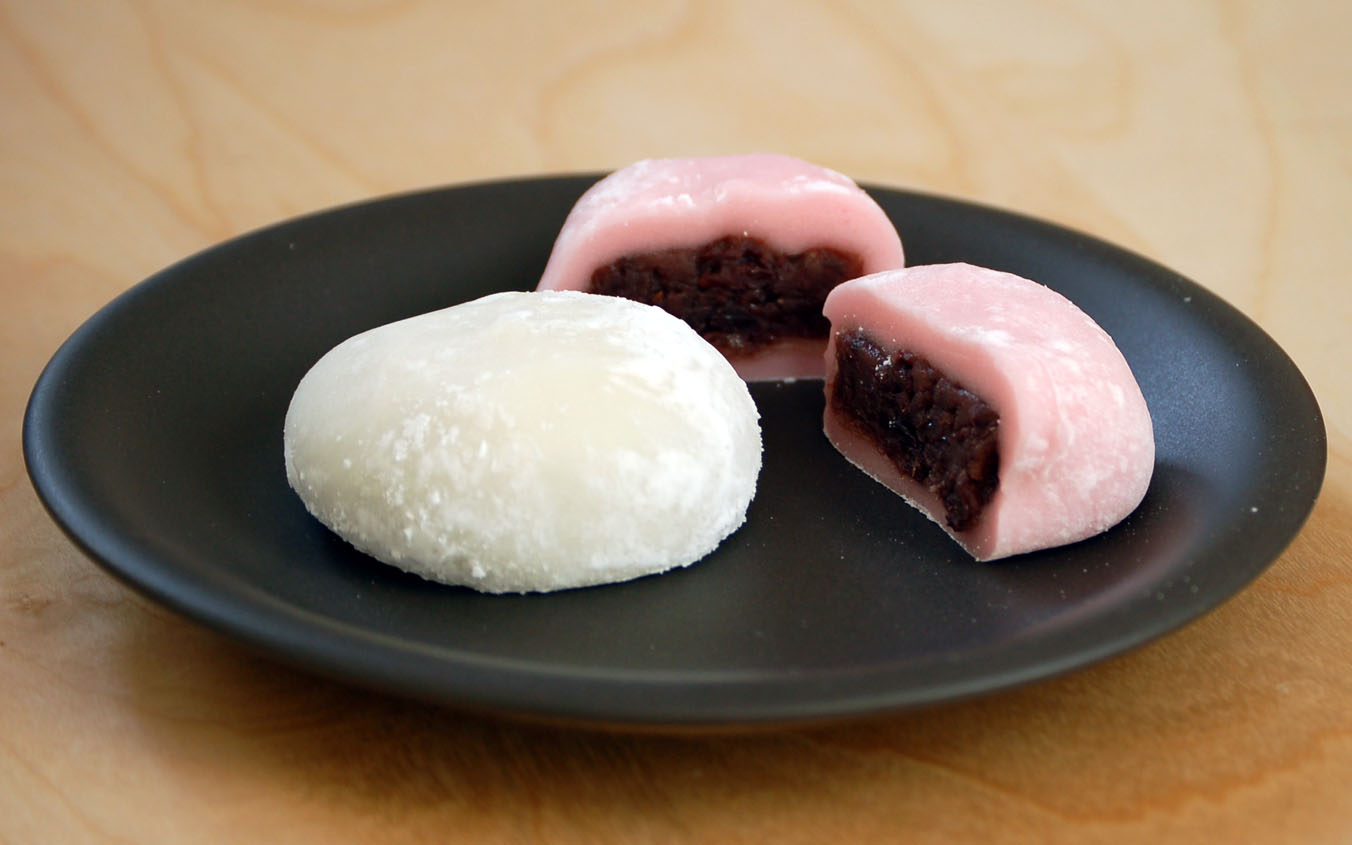
Daifuku is a glutinous rice cake stuffed with sweet filling, most commonly anko, sweetened red bean paste made from azuki beans.

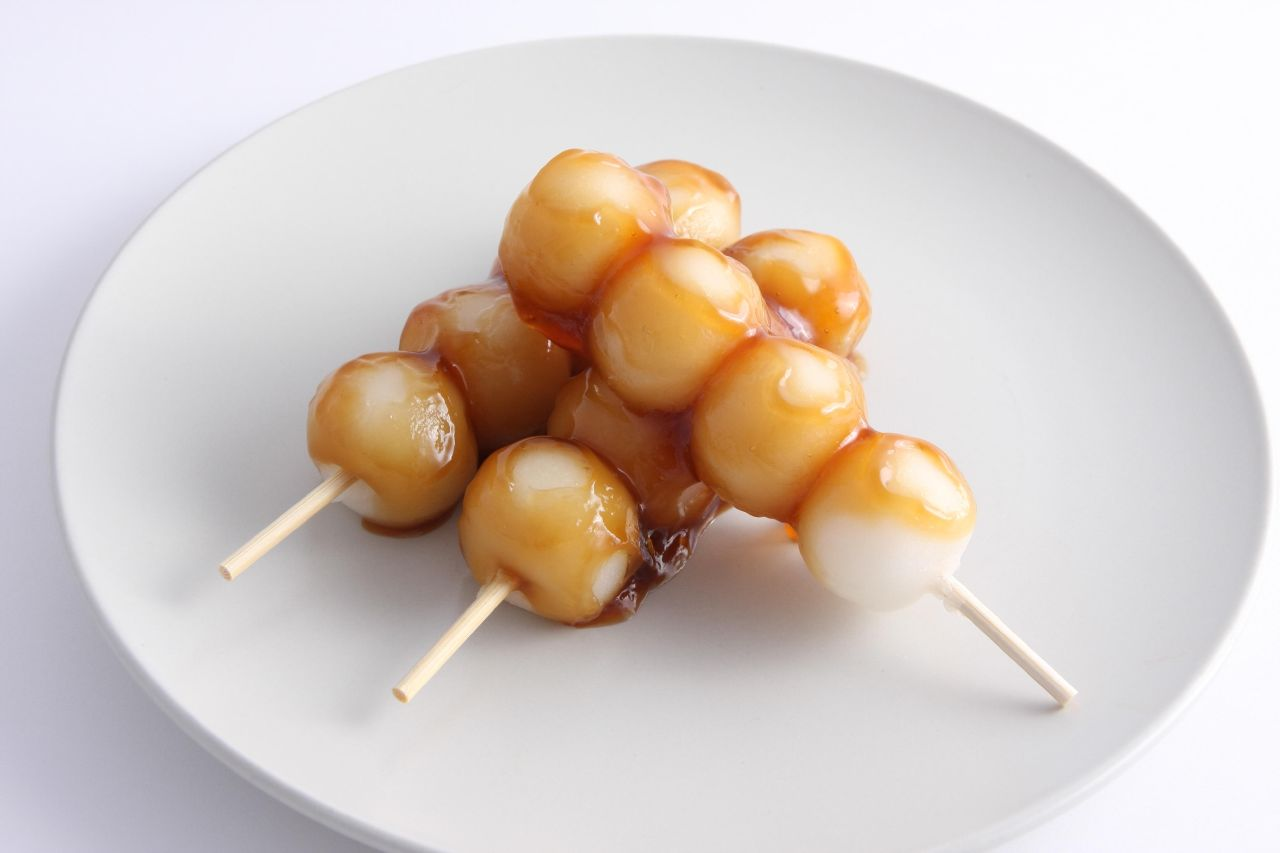
Dango is a dumpling and sweet made from mochiko (rice flour), related to mochi. It is often served with green tea.

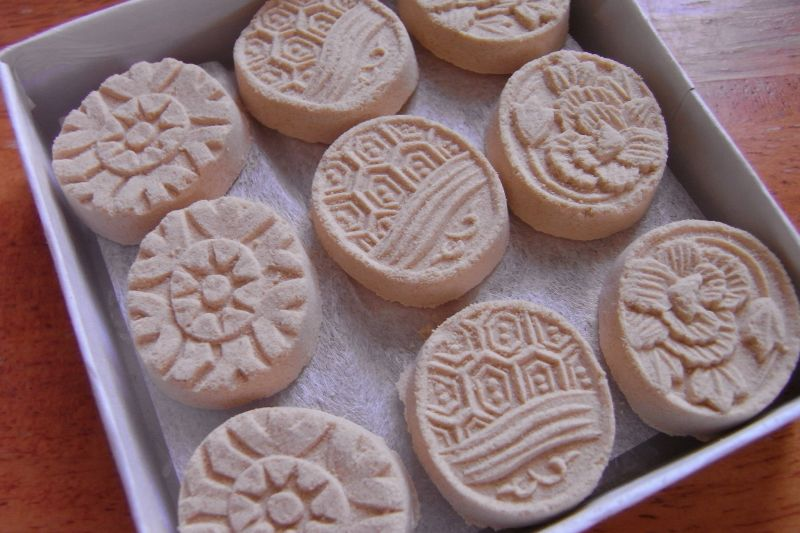
Higashi is dry and contains very little moisture, and thus keeps relatively longer than other kinds of wagashi.

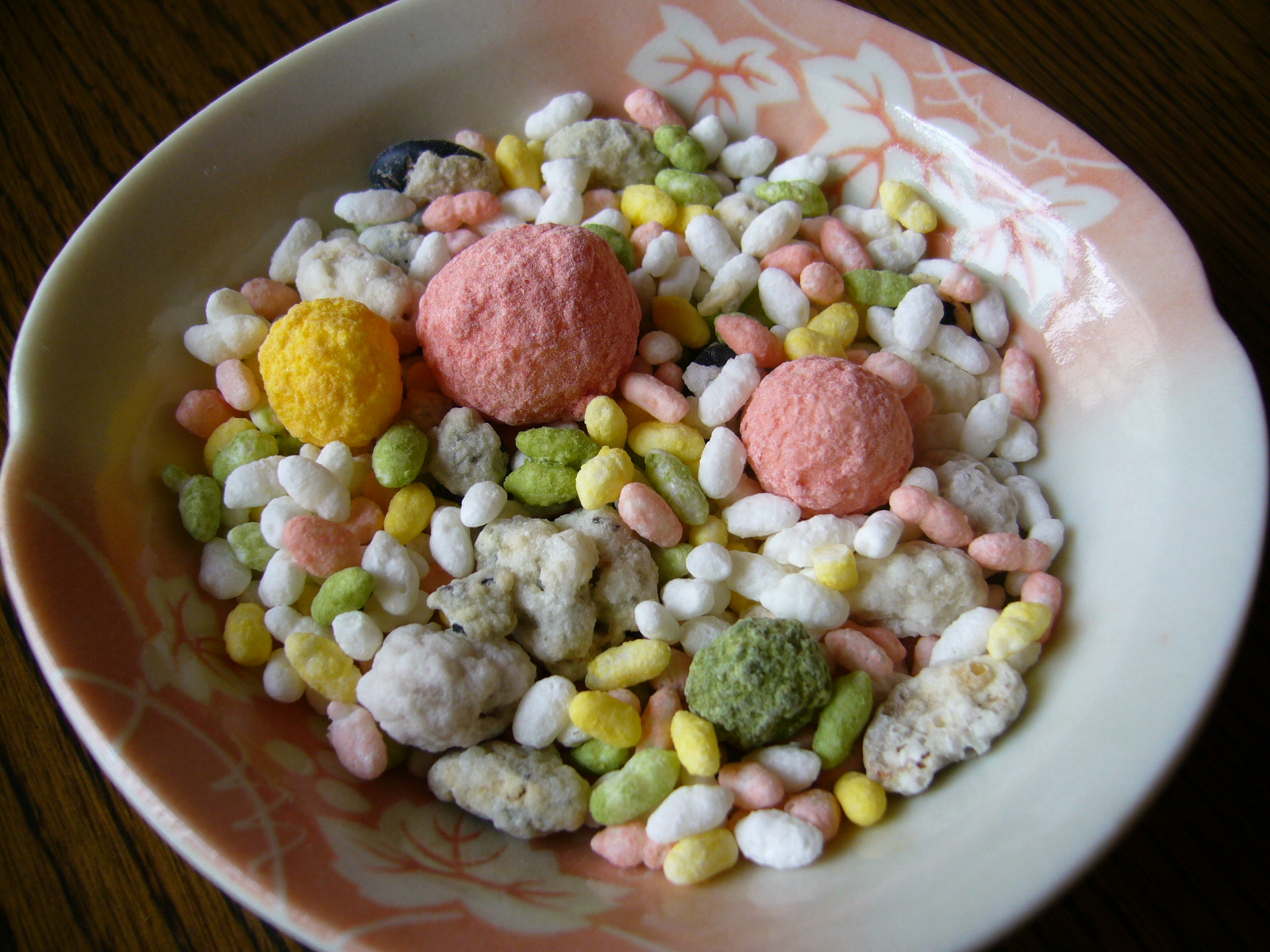
Arare is a type of bite-sized Japanese cracker made from glutinous rice and flavored with soy sauce. Sweet and savory varieties are prepared.

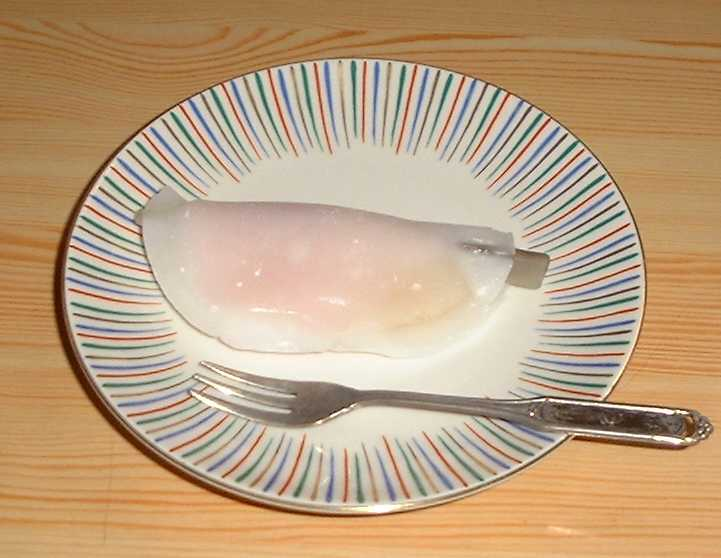
Hanabiramochi is a Japanese sweet usually eaten at the beginning of the year.

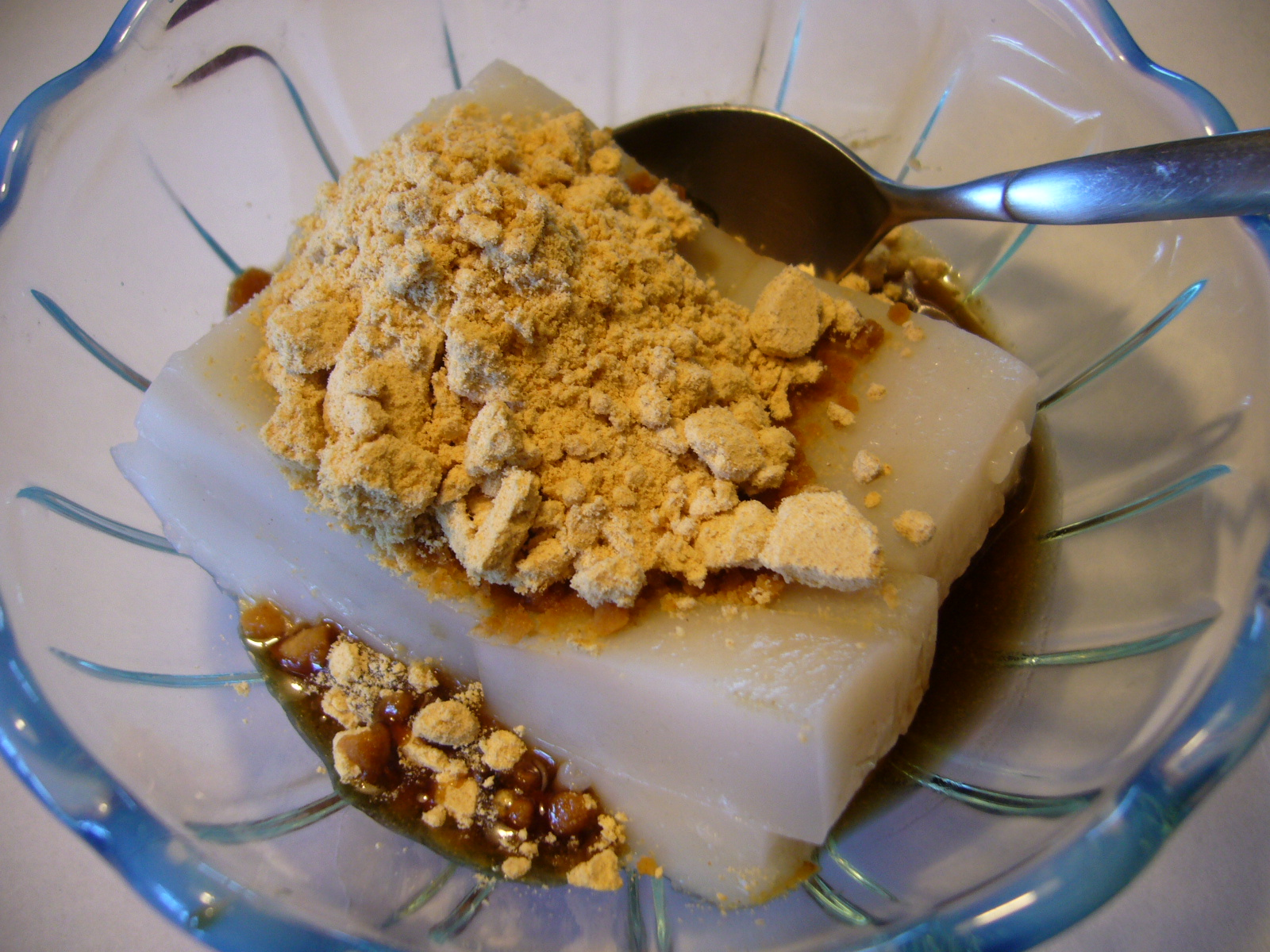
Kuzumochi are mochi cakes made of kuzuko.

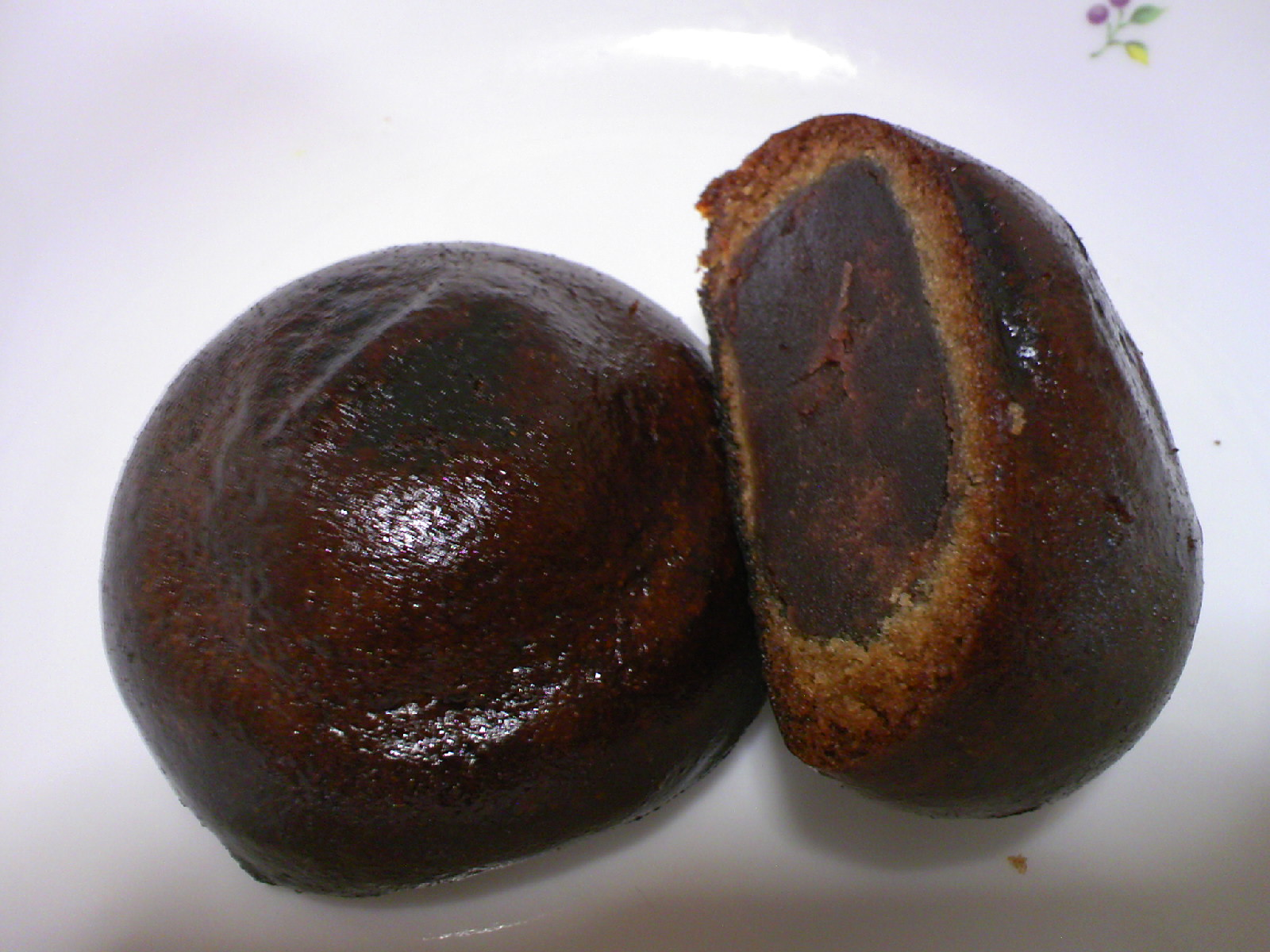
Manjū is a popular traditional Japanese confection; most have an outside made from flour, rice powder and buckwheat and a filling of red bean paste, made from boiled azuki beans and sugar.

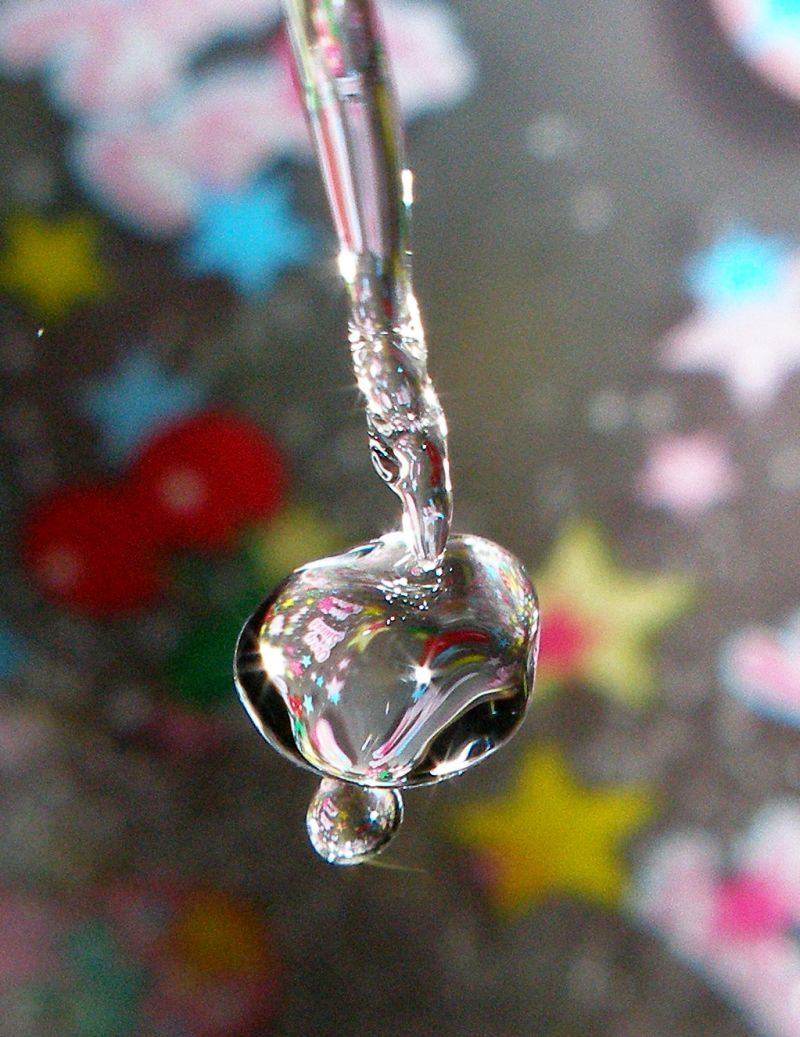
Mizuame is a sweetener from Japan which is translated literally to "water candy". A clear, thick, sticky liquid, it is made by converting starch to sugars.

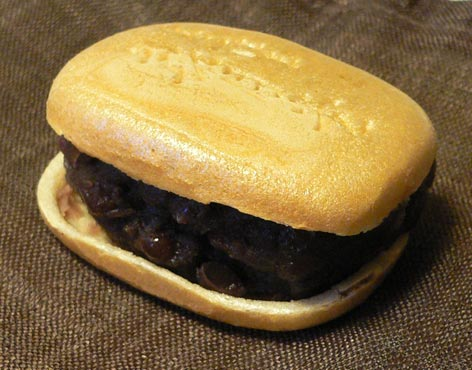
Monaka is prepared with azuki bean jam filling sandwiched between two thin crisp wafers made from mochi.

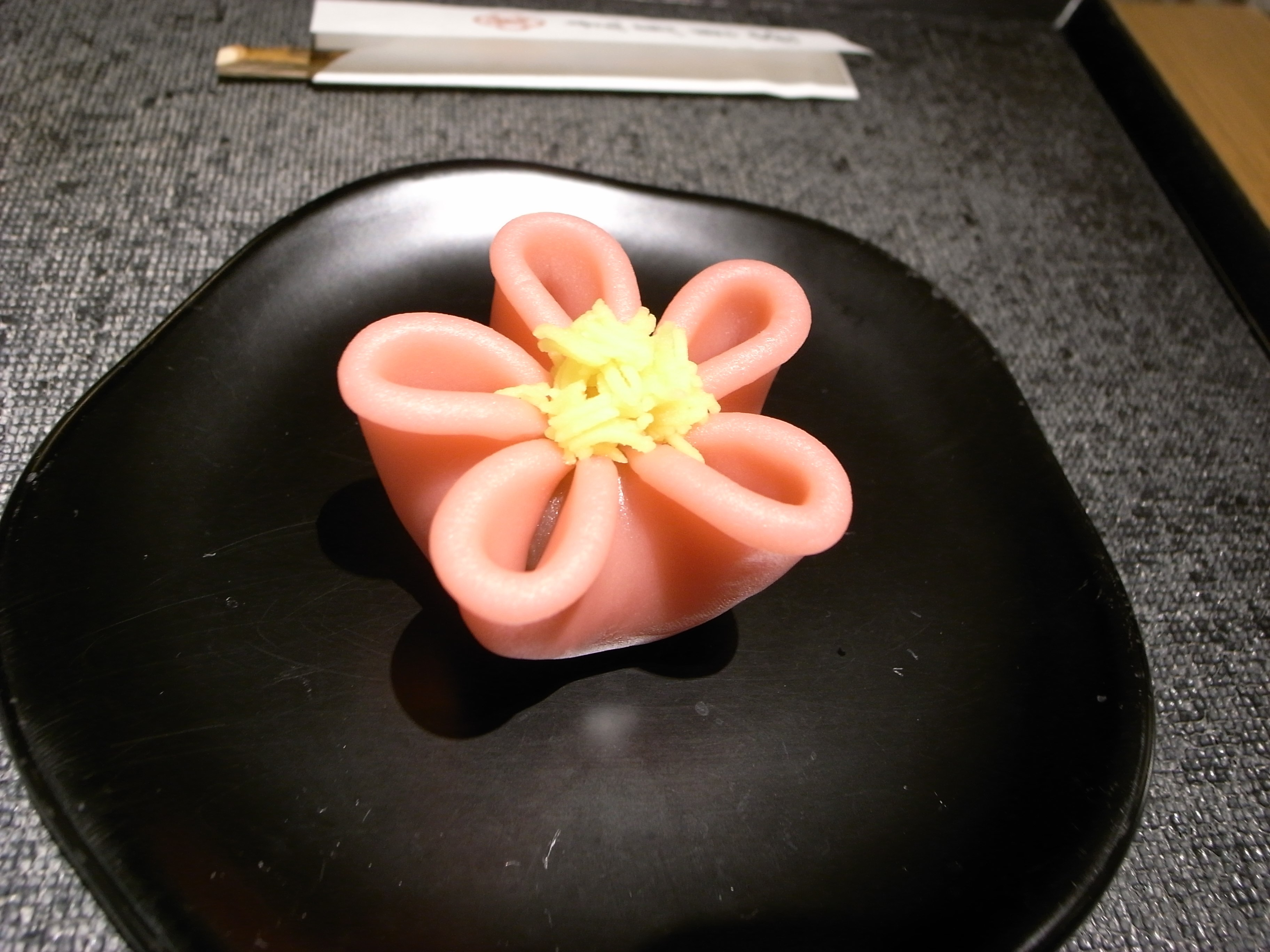
Namagashi are a type of wagashi, which is a general term for snacks used in the Japanese tea ceremony. Namagashi may contain fruit jellies, other gelatines such as Kanten or sweetened bean paste.

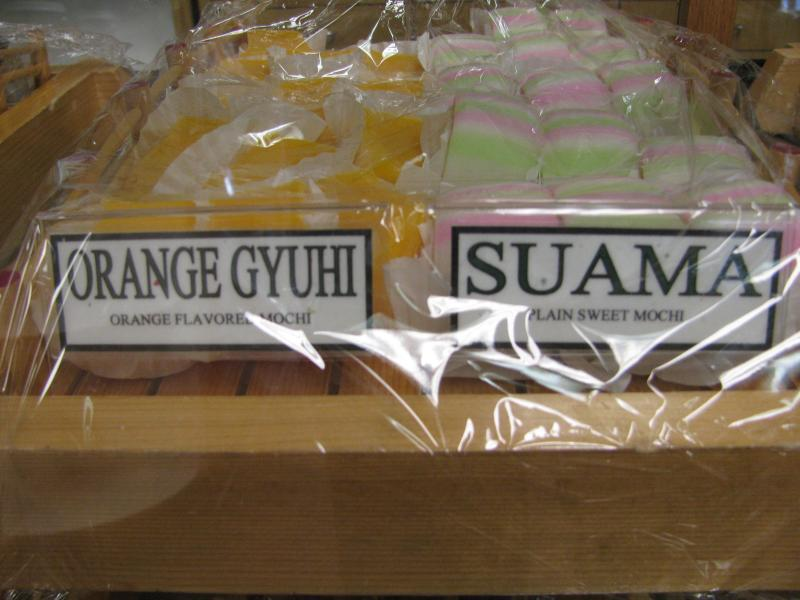
Suama (right) and orange gyūhi (left)

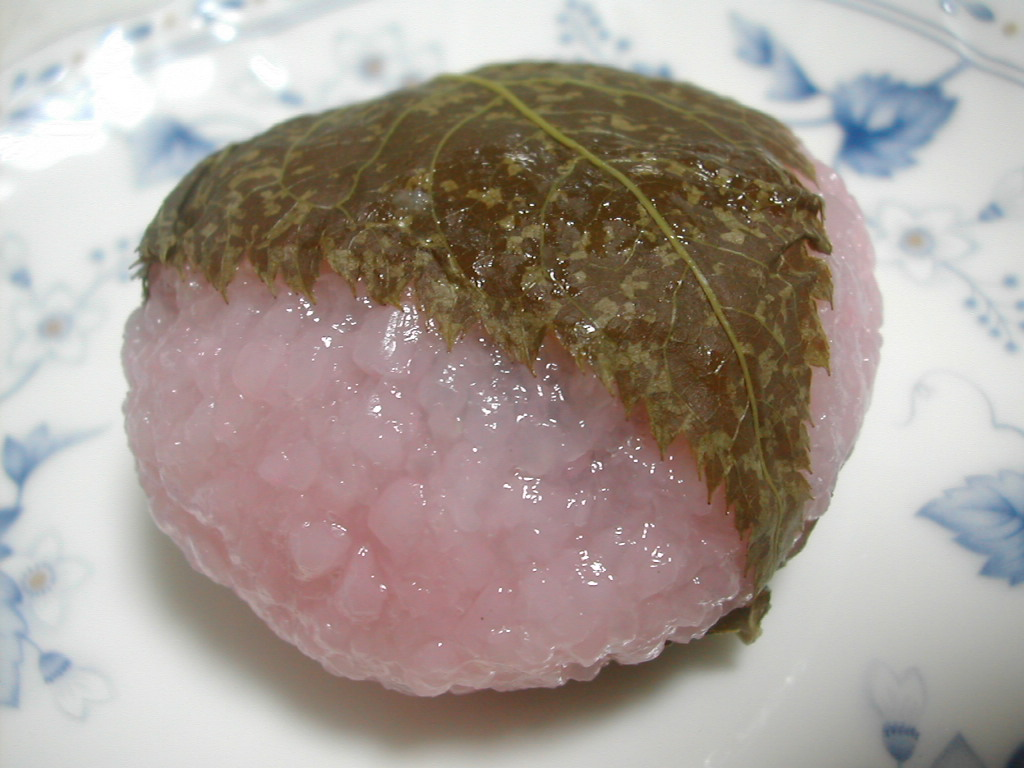
Dōmyōji consists of a sweet pink mochi and red bean paste, covered with a cherry blossom leaf.

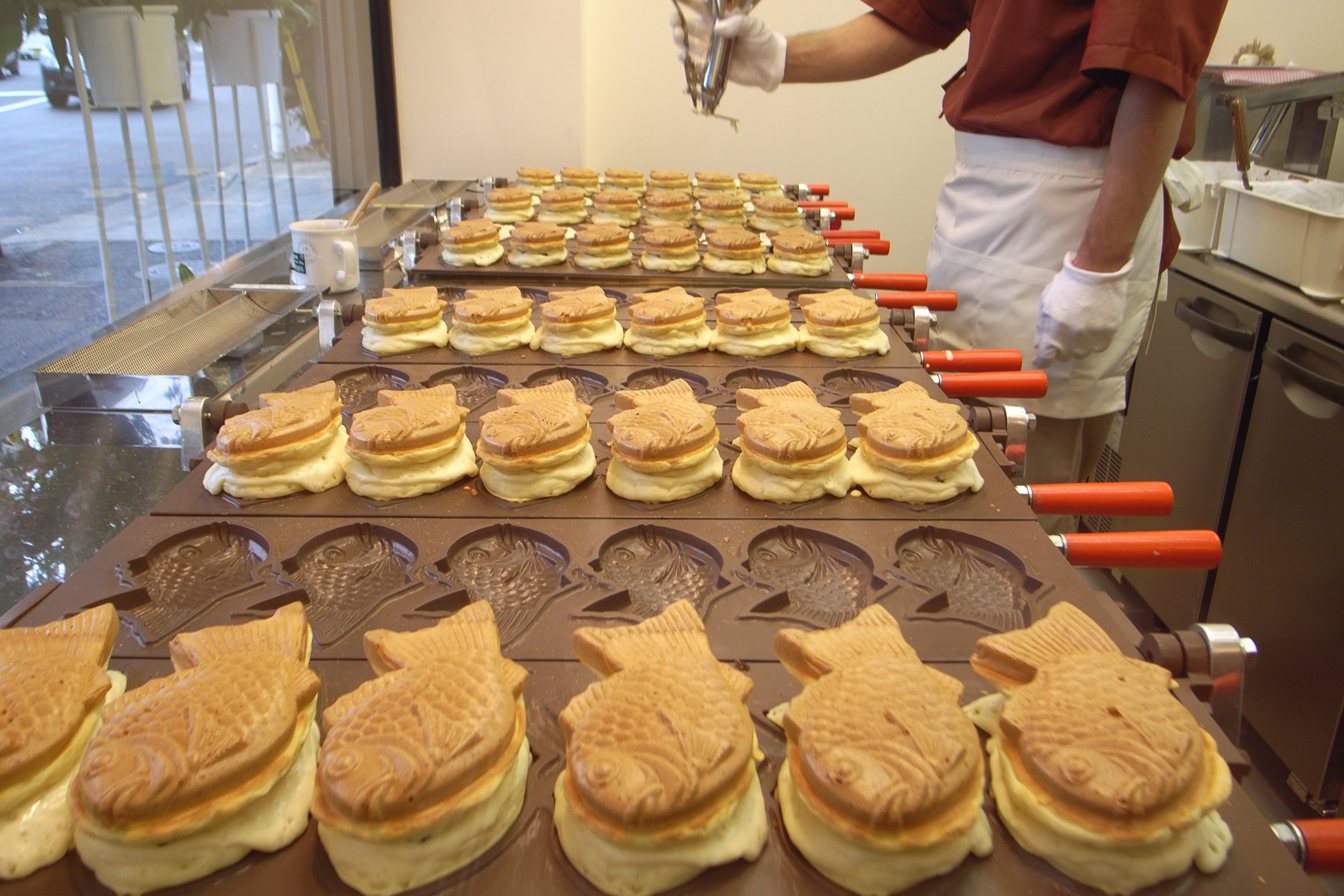
Taiyaki, literally "baked sea bream", is a Japanese fish-shaped cake.

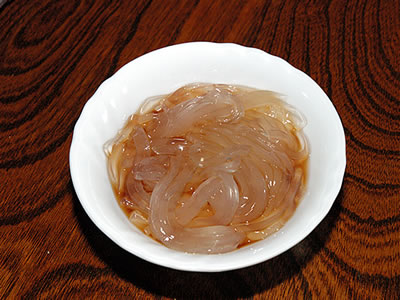
Tokoroten is prepared with jelly extracted from seaweeds such as tengusa (Gelidiaceae) and ogonori (Gracilaria) by boiling. Pressed against a device, jelly is shaped into noodles.

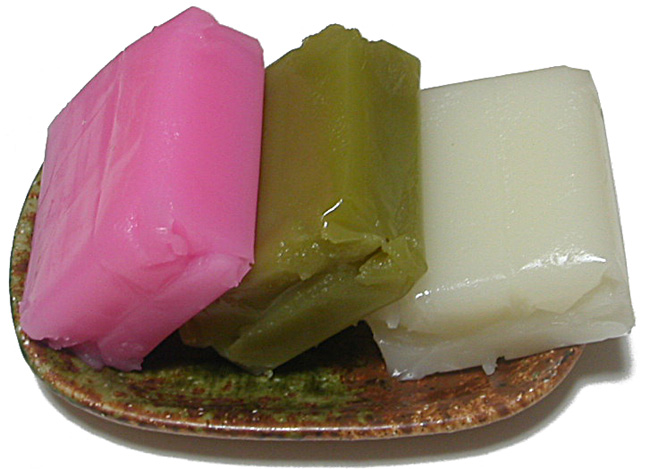
Uirō is a traditional Japanese steamed cake made of rice flour and sugar.

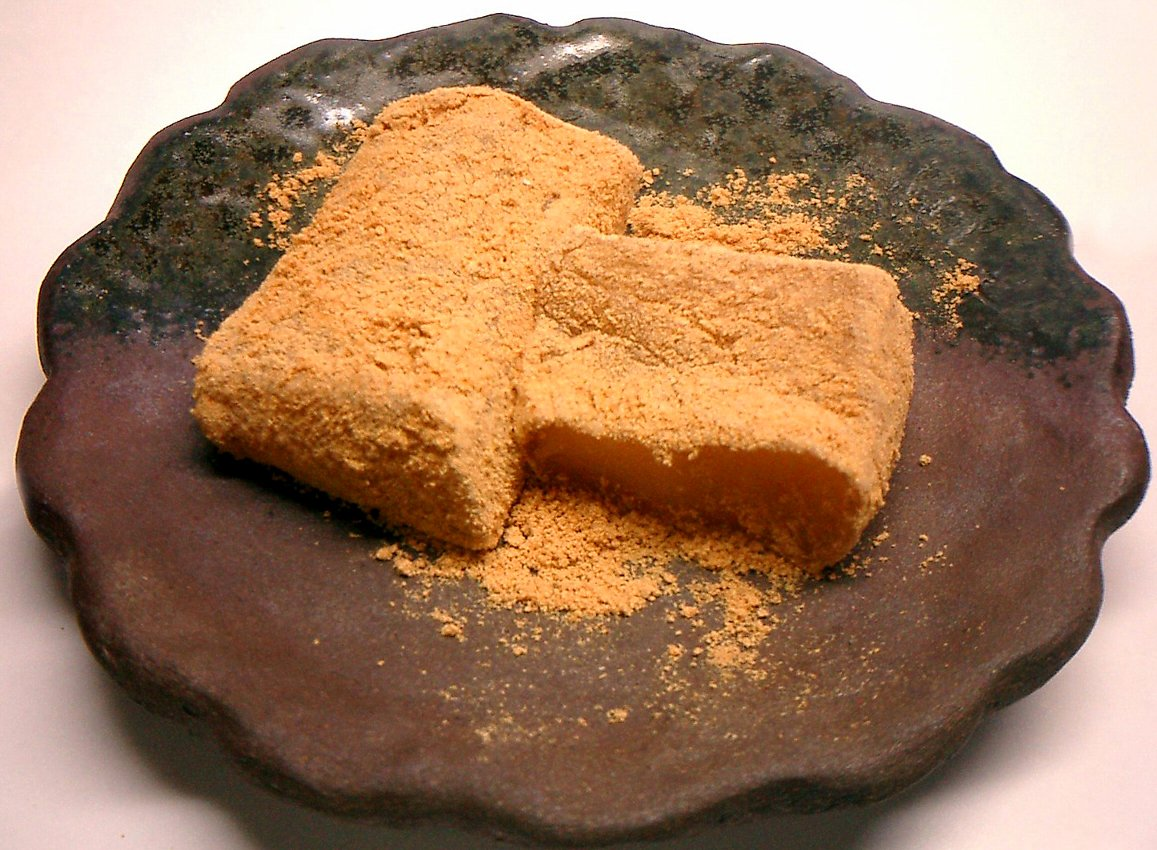
Warabimochi is a jelly-like confection made from bracken starch and covered or dipped in kinako (sweet toasted soybean flour).

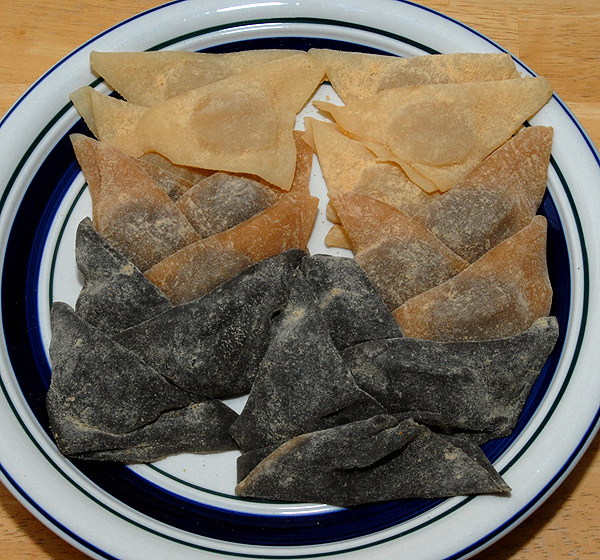
Assorted yatsuhashi. The flavors, from top to bottom, are tofu, cinnamon, sesame.

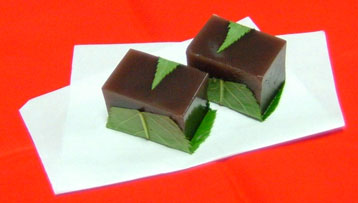
Yōkan is a thick, jellied dessert made of red bean paste, agar, and sugar. It is usually sold in a block form, and eaten in slices.

== Brands ==
- Black Thunder
- Fusen gum
- Hyōroku mochi
- Shiroi Koibito

== See also ==
- Japanese cuisine – Sweets
- List of Japanese dishes – Japanese-style sweets
- List of desserts
- Chocolate in Japan
