= Sugar in Japan =

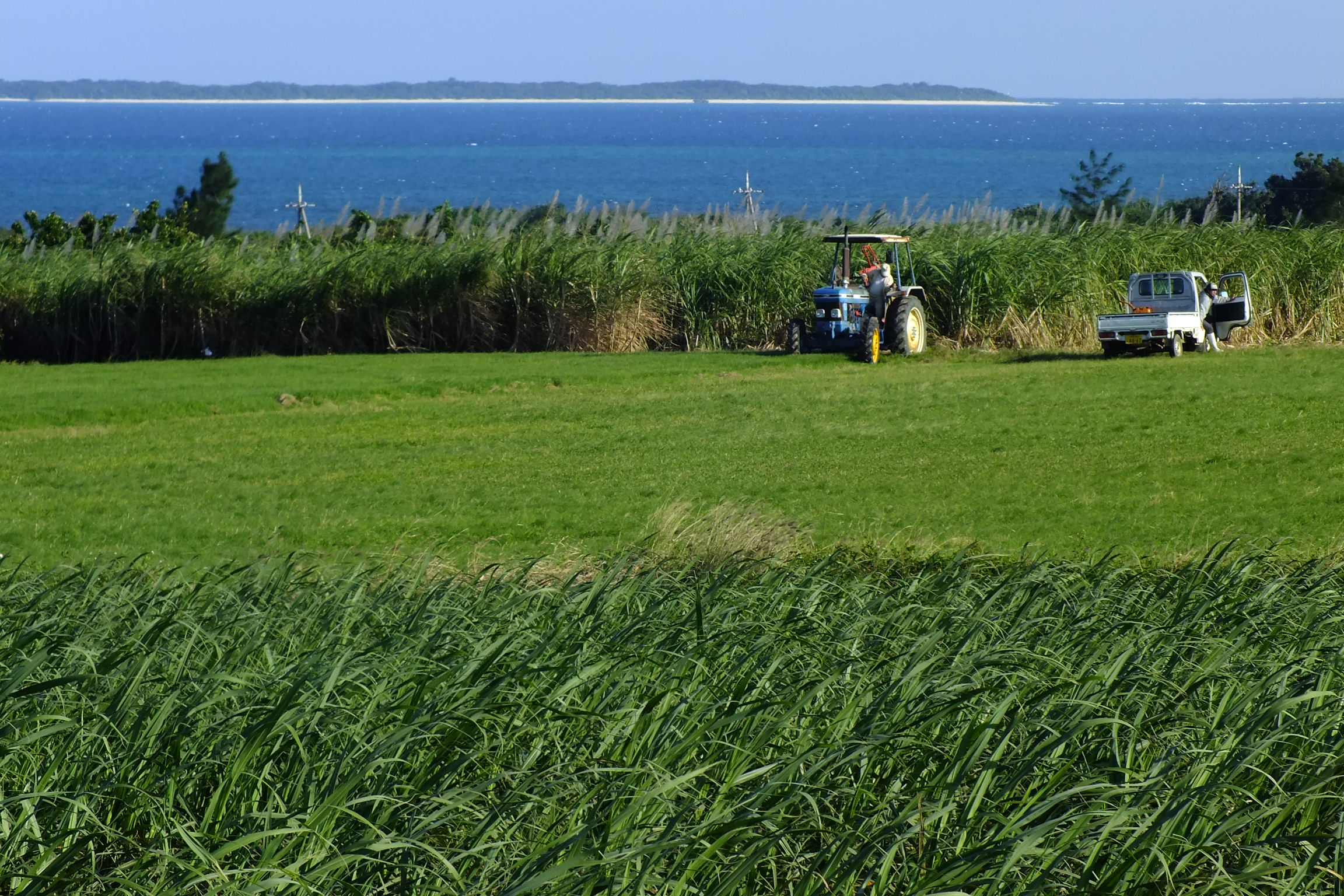
Fields of sugarcane on Iriomote Island, Okinawa Prefecture

Sugar is known in Japanese as satō (さとう) or simply tō. Although sugarcane entered Japan in the eighth century, sugar remained rare until sugarcane was reintroduced in the 16th century. Over the following centuries, sugar consumption and production, particularly in the late 19th century as Japan annexed Taiwan and new sugar processing technology was developed. In the 21st century, sugar features in much of the processed food consumed in Japan, but consumption remains low compared to other countries of similar economic development.

Most sugar in Japan is made from the Saccharum officinarum sugarcane variety. White sugar is the most common, though brown is also sold. In Japan's south, craftspeople on Shikoku island make a type of sugar named wasanbon from local sugarcane. It has a slight fragrance and soft texture, characteristics which make it sought after by Japanese confectioners in making the confection higashi.

== History ==
=== Early ===
Cane sugar entered Japan in the eighth century. Over the following millennium, Japanese people consumed it rarely, and when they did, primarily as a medicine. Rather than sugar, when cooks desired sweet flavors they used sweeteners like honey, rice glucose, or syrups made from vines called amazuru, or sweet arrowroot. Sugar was prized, such that when the Buddhist priest Eisai (1141–1215) wrote of sugar, he described its flavor as not only the most exceptional example of sweetness, but the greatest flavor of all.

=== Reintroduction ===
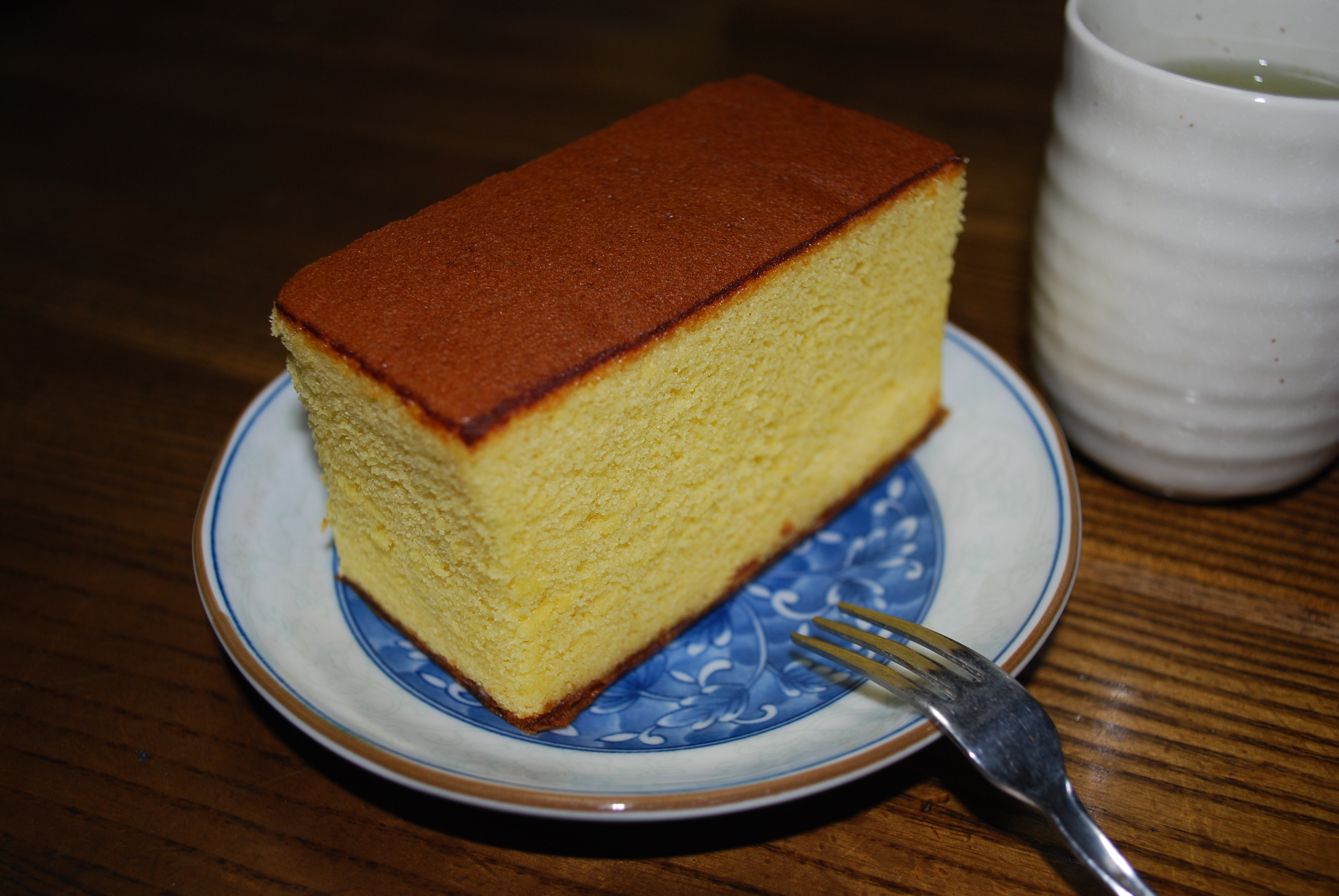
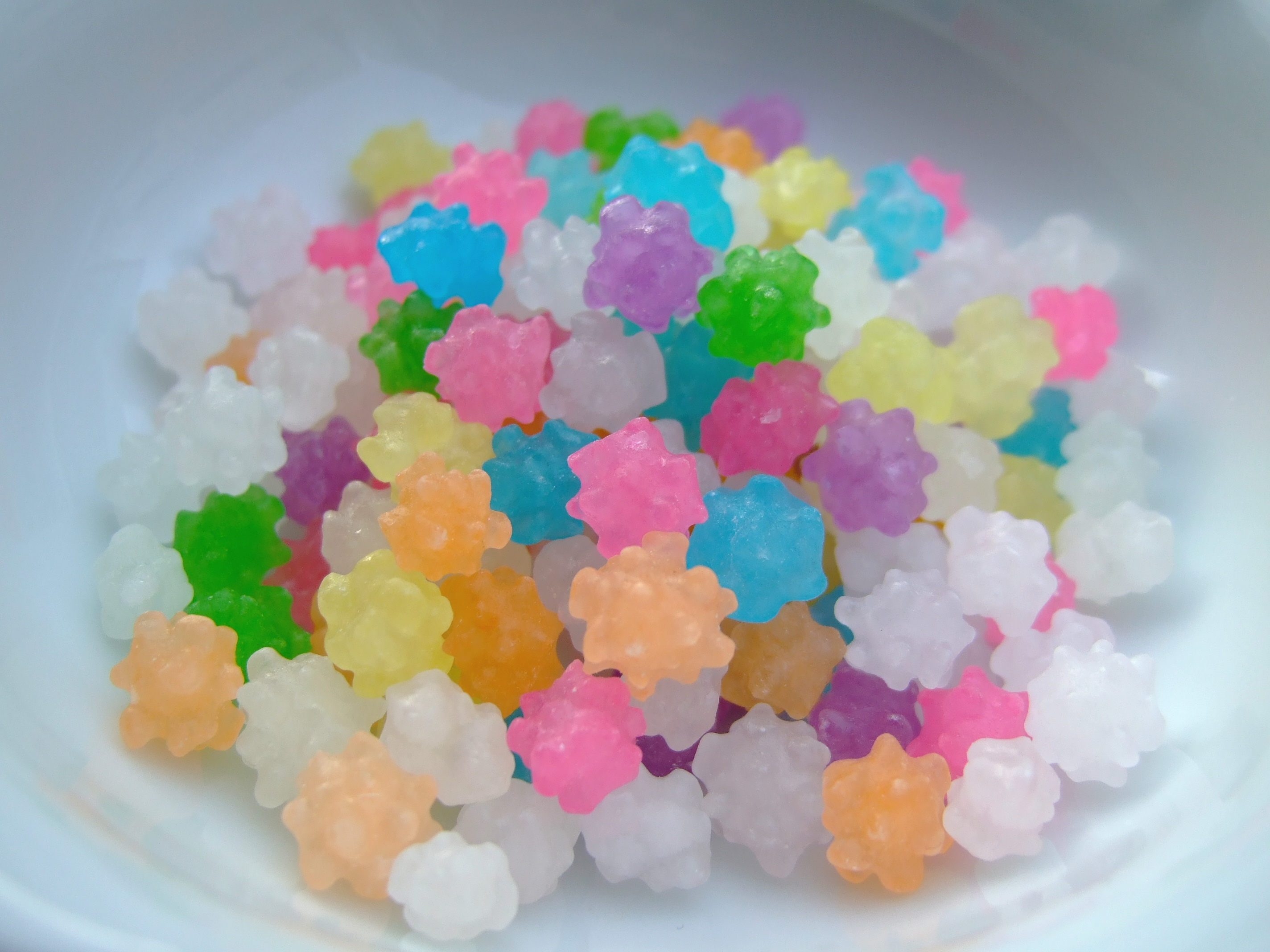
Castella and Konpeitō

By the time of the early sixteenth century, sweets in Japan contained little if any sugar. This began to change in the second half of the century, as European and Asian traders reintroduced cane sugar to Japan. Uptake was assisted by activity on the Ryukyu islands, where Chinese and Ryukyuan people established plantations and brought equipment that could process the ingredient. Simultaneously Spanish and Portuguese merchants and missionaries brought culinary information, introducing early versions of sugar-based desserts that persist in Japanese cuisine, such as the sponge cake castella and the hard candy konpeitō.

With new knowledge, savory Buddhist dishes were remade as sugary sweets, and the confection wagashi was created by combining refined sugar with colorings and glutinous rice. Sugar was still used sparingly, but now held the status of a luxury. Despite the creation of the new sweets, most consumption remained medicinal. When it did feature in savory cuisine, it flavored vegetables and sukiyaki, and never tea. In 1609, Japan invaded the Ryukyu islands, capturing the sugar industry. In the 1630s, the Japanese government imposed the system of Sakoku, a period of semi-isolationism that signaled the end of Portuguese influence. Sugar, still coveted by the Japanese, entered Japan through Nagasaki, the only place where trade was permitted. Much supply came from Dutch traders, who were fond of sugar shipments for the ballast they provided their ships. Other sources of sugar later in this period included China for white sugar, and the Ryukyu islands for brown. The international sourcing of sugar lent a perception of foreignness to it and sweets made with it. From the Edo period late into the Meiji era, vendors donned costumes they thought Chinese and sold sweets on the street, chanting songs in a language they thought sounded Chinese.

By the end of the 17th century, sweets made from sugar had become more widely consumed. Among the ruling elite, such sweets were eaten accompanying tea. These were made with imported sugar, by confectioners who controlled the supply. Brown sugar, sourced domestically was used by purveyors selling to a broad audience to make senbei. In the first half of the 18th century, Tokugawa Yoshimune promoted domestic production of sugar to reduce Japan's trade deficit, ordering that sugarcane be planted across Japan. By 1800 Japan was producing more sugar than it was importing. Some locations specialized in the sugars they produced, such as Okinawa and Amami Ōshima, which produced brown sugar, and the island of Shikoku, whose fine-grained sugar became known as wasanbon and gained favor among the elite for its use in making wagashi.

=== Wider adoption ===
Sugar consumption grew across the 19th century, as workers in Japan developed the habit of tea breaks, creating demand for snacks that could be served as accompaniments. Increasingly, sugar made appearances in media and advertisements which had children and adults eating sugar, often featuring the trope of sweet peddlers crying out their promotions. For much of this period, confectioners operated their stores independently of each other, with little coordination. Despite a growth in consumption, Japan consumed less sugar than Western countries in the 19th century, and regarded Western sweets with distaste, considering the smell of milk and butter off-putting.

Consumption began to increase dramatically at the end of the 19th century as technological developments permitting more efficient sugar processing, and the acquisition of new sources of sugar were responsible. In 1885, the industry composition of small, independent manufacturers shifted, as the Meiji government instituted taxes on the sale and manufacture of confectionery based on the perception that confections contributed nothing meaningful to the economy or people's health. In response, confectioners rallied together, forming industry associations across regions and the country that could agitate for a common interest. In their advocacy, associations described nutritional benefits of milk and butter, and attested that "sugar helped digestion and warmed the body".

In 1895, Japan annexed Taiwan and began developing industry and importing its sugar. According to historian Kubo Fumikatsu, the potential outcomes of success or failure in establishing industry in Taiwan was assigned great importance within Japan, with perceived impacts on international reputation and the greater imperialism project. The business began operations in late 1900. By 1903, almost all of Japan's sugar came from Taiwan, and the average annual consumption had increased in estimates to 12 pounds (5.4 kg) per capita from 5 pounds in 1888.

Making brown sugar in 1895 on Tokunoshima Island, Kagoshima.

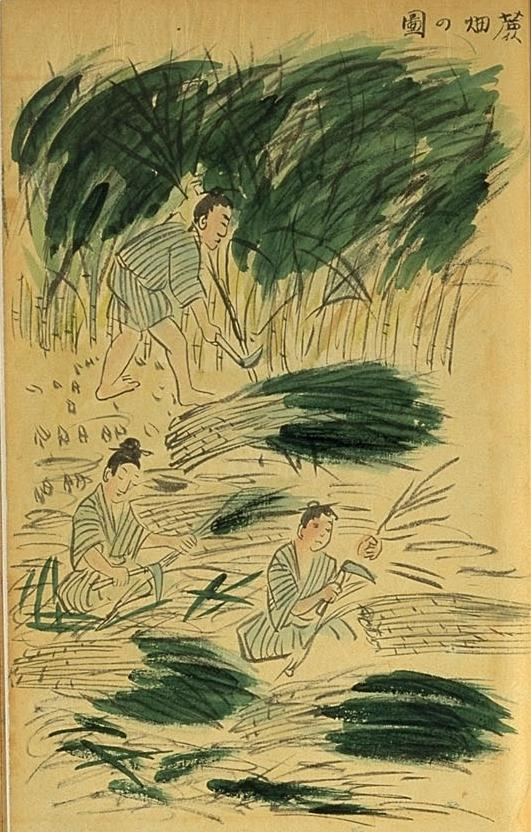

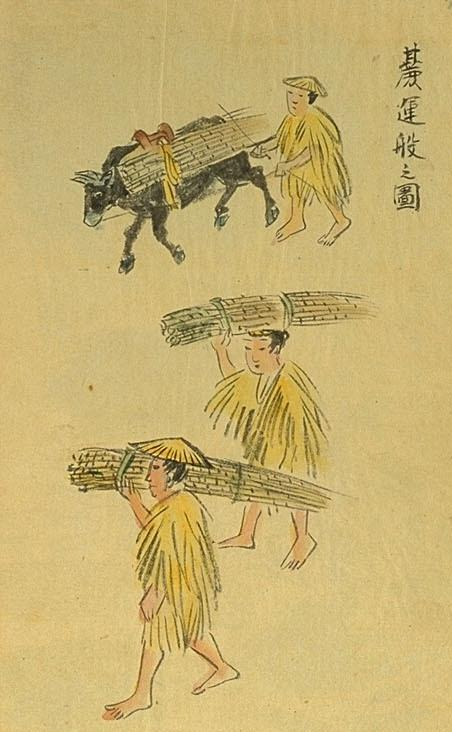

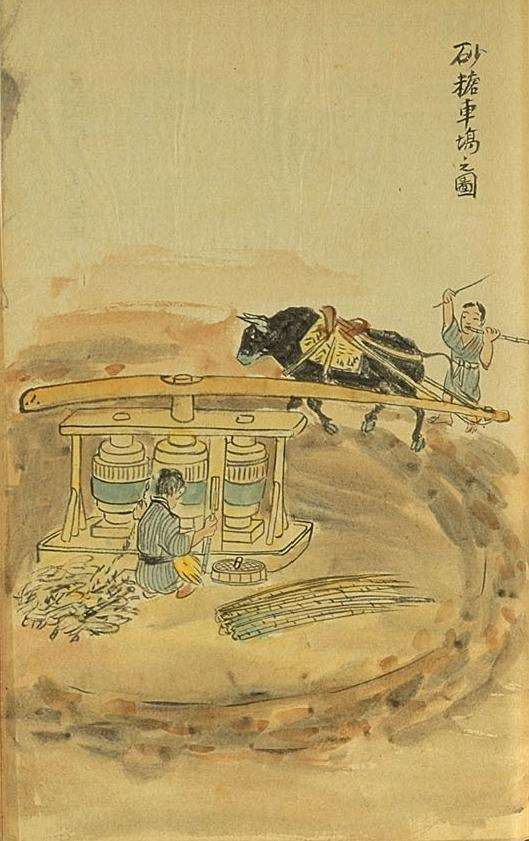

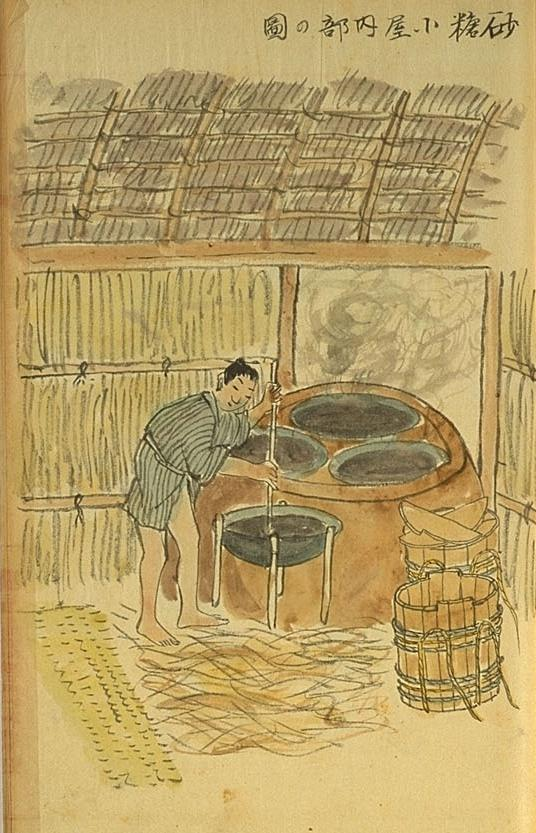

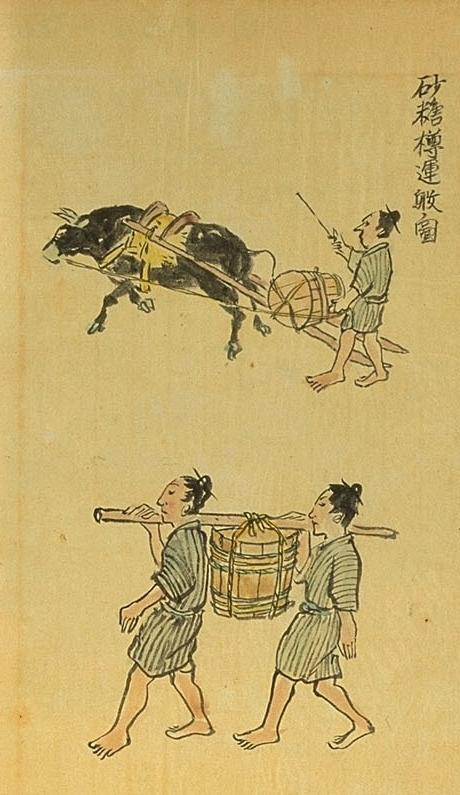

==== 20th century ====
With lower prices, chefs in the early 20th century began more often to use it in their savory cooking, including in sushi rice. Records from the 1920s show the Imperial army being fed a diet including main meals of curries and stews containing meat flavored with sugar and desserts of doughnuts. Sugar on toast became a popular breakfast, requiring much less time to prepare than the hours needed to cook rice. Over time, the combination developed a reputation as sophisticated. In a more broad sense, sugar became a symbol of civilized modernity, and rural cuisines lacking the ingredient became increasingly perceived as inferior. Nutritionists argued for greater sugar consumption among the public based on the calories it provided, particularly as the price of staples became increasingly expensive. In their advocacy, sugar was particularly suited for soldiers and mountaineers who needed food that was lightweight but calorie-dense. Outside of savory cooking, Western, the public consumed increasing amounts of sugary confections such as chocolates and caramels, and in 1919, the sugary-milk beverage Calpis was created.

Imports continued to increase in the first decades of the 20th century, and by 1935, 90% of Japan's sugar was being sourced from Taiwan. According to estimates by the Bank of Japan, by 1939 the average Japanese person was eating 33 pounds (15 kg) of sugar a year. In World War II, sugar became the first food rationed on a national level, though soldiers still consumed some confections purchased at soldiers canteens or sent by family members back home. For a few years following the war, sugar remained scarce, and some confections were made with sweet potato, but sugar consumption soon began to again increase, largely as processed foods and carbonated drinks made up more of the diet. In the 1970s, the sugar substitute Stevia was developed in Japan and began to be used as an ingredient in foods. Sugar today features in much of the processed food in the Japanese diet as a sweetener. Despite this, as of the 2010s sugar consumption in Japan remained significantly lower than what was typical in other high-income developed nations.

== Types ==
Most sugar in Japan is made from the Saccharum officinarum sugarcane variety. The majority of what is sold is pure white, and is sold in caster, crystal, cube, granulated, and syrup forms. Brown sugar (kurozatō) is also sold, historically in clumps of sugar. Today, it is available in multiple grades of lightness, and like white sugar is sometimes sold as a syrup.

=== Wasanbon ===
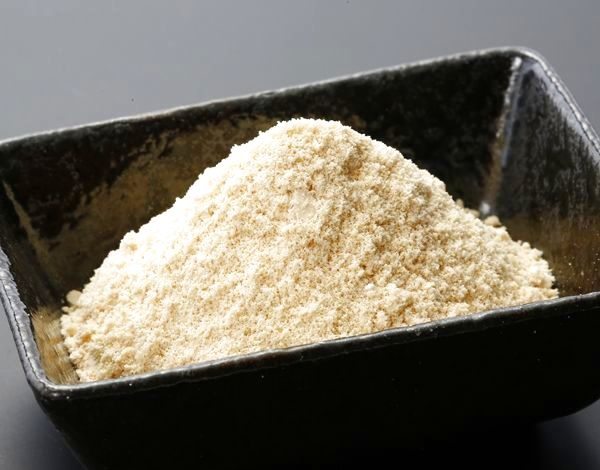
Wasanbon

Wasanbon is the most famous of Japan's sugars used by wagashi confectioners, and has a soft, fine texture, a slightly yellow appearance and a mild scent. It is made by craftspeople on Shikoku island in the Kagawa and Tokushima Prefectures, using the thin Saccharum sinense sugarcane (chi kuto or take kibi) that grows on the island. Each year from the middle of December, the sugarcane harvest begins, initiating the 20-day process of making wasanbon.

Craftspeople begin by crushing sugarcane, releasing a sweet juice, which they boil to evaporate water until the soft ball stage is reached. This liquid is poured into molds and left to set to form a mix of sugar crystals, treacle and molasses known as shirashita tō. From here, the process of isolating the sugar begins by wrapping the shirashita tō in cloth and placing it in a wooden box where it is compressed via a system of pulleys and heavy stones. By hand, the bag is then kneaded in water for two hours. Historically, this process of compression and washing was repeated three times, but is today more often done four times to remove more treacle. The resulting sugar is left for a week to dry.

The best known use confectioners have of wasanbon is in making higashi, a shaped and colored confection made by combining rice flour and fine sugar. These are eaten as part of the Japanese tea ceremony—the sweet flavor sought before the bitterness of matcha. In a food with only two ingredients, the flavor and texture of wasanbon becomes particularly prominent.

== See also ==
- Agriculture, forestry, and fishing in Japan
- Chocolate in Japan
- History of sugar
- List of Japanese desserts and sweets

== Sources ==
=== Books ===
- Cwiertka, Katarzyna; Yasuhara, Miho (2010). "Beyond Hunger: Grocery Shopping, Cooking, and Eating in 1940s Japan". In Rath, Eric C; Assmann, Stephanie (eds.). Japanese Foodways, Past and Present. Urbana, Chicago and Springfield: University of Illinois Press. ISBN 978-0252077524.
- Goldstein, Darra, ed. (2015). The Oxford Companion to Sugar and Sweets. New York: Oxford University Press. ISBN 978-0-19-931339-6.
  - Beranbaum, Rose Levy; Krondl, Michael. "Sugar". In Goldstein (2015).
  - Rath, Eric C (2015a). "Japan". In Goldstein (2015).
  - Rath, Eric C (2015b). "Wasanbon". In Goldstein (2015).
  - Warner, Deborah Jean. "Stevia". In Goldstein (2015).
- Holtzman, Jon D (2016). "Sweetness, Gender, and Identity in Japanese Culinary Culture". In Banerjee-Dube, Ishita (ed.). Cooking Cultures: Convergent Histories of Food and Feeling. New York: Cambridge University Press. ISBN 978-1-107-14036-3.
- Hosking, Richard (1996). A Dictionary of Japanese Food. Shinagawa-ku, Tokyo: Tuttle. ISBN 978-4-8053-1335-0.
- Kushner, Barak (2012). "Sweetness and Empire: Sugar Consumption in Imperial Japan". In Francks, Penelope; Hunter, Janet (eds.). The Historical Consumer: Consumption and Everyday Life in Japan, 1850-2000. Basingstoke, Hampshire: Palgrave Macmillan. ISBN 978-1-349-32413-2.
- Mitsuda, Tatsuya (2017). "'Sweets Reimagined': The Construction of Confectionary Identities, 1890–1930". In Niehaus, Andreas; Walravens, Tine (eds.). Feeding Japan: The Cultural and Political Issues of Dependency and Risk. Palgrave Macmillan Cham. ISBN 978-3-319-50552-7.
- Rath, Eric C (2016). Japan's Cuisines: Food, Place and Identity. London: Reaktion Books. ISBN 978-1-78023-643-8.
- Smil, Vaclav; Kobayashi, Kazuhiko (2012). Japan's Dietary Transition and its Impacts. Cambridge, Massachusetts: The MIT Press. ISBN 978-0-262-01782-4.
- Smith, Andrew F (2015). Sugar: A Global History. The Edible Series. London: Reaktion Books. ISBN 978-1-78023-434-2.

=== Journals ===
- Rath, Eric C (2008). "Banquets Against Boredom: Towards Understanding (Samurai) Cuisine in Early Modern Japan". Early Modern Japan. 16. hdl:1811/36286.
- Rath, Eric C; Watanabe, Takeshi (1 November 2023). "Amai: Sweets and Sweeteners in Japanese History". Gastronomica. 23 (4): 2. doi:10.1525/gfc.2023.23.4.1.
