= Ajigonomi =

Japanese snack food mix

- Japanese snack food
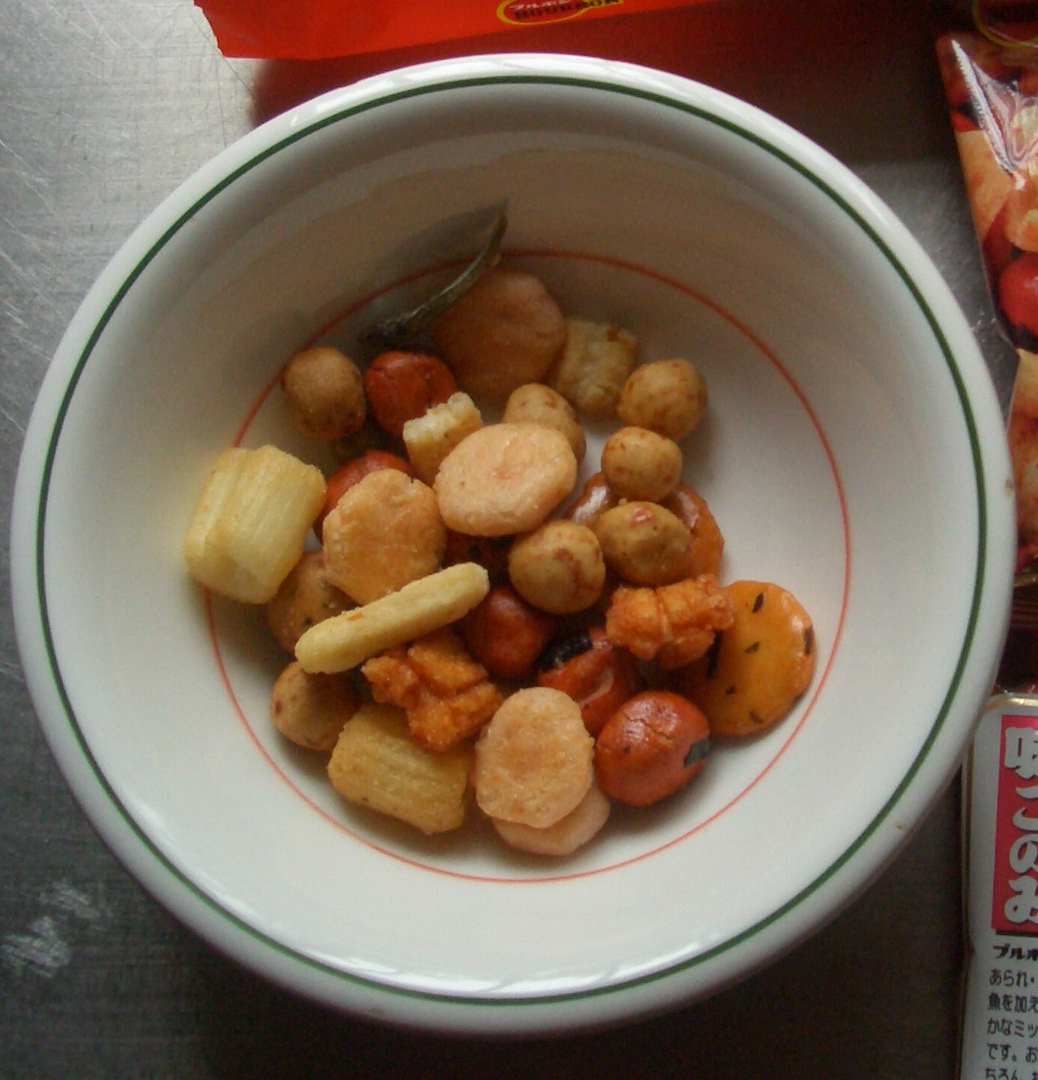
- Japanese name: 味ごのみ
- Maker: Bourbon
- Ingredients: glutinous rice flour, starch, peanuts, vegetable oil, flour, sugar, rice, beans, dried fish, soy sauce, salt, mizuame

Ajigonomi is a blend of Japanese arare produced by the Bourbon food company. It consists of various kinds of rice crackers and peanut based items together with tiny dried fish.

Three variations are sold:

1. Standard ajigonomi
2. Spicy ajigonomi (karakuchi ajigonomi)
3. Black ajigonomi (kuro ajigonomi)

Each 100g of ajigonmi contains 471 calories.

The gonomi, meaning "preference", in the name of the snack is the rendaku version of the konomi in okonomiyaki, although ajigonomi is not related to okonomiyaki.
