= List of registered intangible cultural properties (Japan) =

Registered intangible cultural properties (登録無形文化財, tōroku mukei bunkazai) are a category of the cultural properties of Japan introduced by a 2021 amendment to the 1950 Law for the Protection of Cultural Properties (Chapter IV, Articles 76f.).

As of 2 July 2026, seven properties have been registered.

| Property | Holder | Comments | Image | Ref. |
|---|---|---|---|---|
| Kaga Cuisine 加賀料理; Kaga-ryōri | Kaga Cuisine Techniques Preservation Association (加賀料理技術保存会, Kaga-ryōri gijutsu hozon-kai) | | | |
| Kadō 華道 kadō | Japan Ikebana Traditional Culture Association (日本いけばな伝統文化協会, Nihon ikebana dentō bunka kyōkai) | | | |
| Namagashi (Nerikiri・Konashi) 菓銘をもつ生菓子（煉切・こなし） kamei o motsu namagashi (nerikiri・konashi) | Master wagashi confectioners guild (優秀和菓子職会, Yūshū wagashi shoku kai) | | | |
| Kyoto Cuisine 京料理; Kyō-ryōri | Kyoto Cuisine Technology Preservation Association (京料理技術保存会, Kyō-ryōri gijutsu hozon-kai) | | | |
| Japanese Calligraphy 書道 shodō | Japan Shodō Culture Association) (日本書道文化協会, Nihon shodō bunka kyōkai) | | | |
| Hand-rolled Tea 手揉み製茶 te-momi-sei cha | Hand-rolled tea techniques preservation association) (手もみ製茶技術保存会, Te-momi-sei cha gijutsu hozon-kai) | | | |
| Traditional Sake Brewing 伝統的酒造り dentō-teki sake-zukuri | Japan traditional kōji-kin sake brewing techniques preservation association) (日本の伝統的なこうじ菌を使った酒造り技術の保存会, Nihon no dentō-teki-na kōji-kin o tsukatta sake-zukuri gijutsu no hozon-kai) | Traditional knowledge and skills of sake-making with koji mold in Japan was inscribed in 2024 on the Representative List of the Intangible Cultural Heritage of Humanity | | |

== See also ==
- List of Important Intangible Cultural Properties
- List of Important Intangible Folk Cultural Properties
- List of Registered Intangible Folk Cultural Properties
