= Gionbō =

Japanese confectionery

- Type: Wagashi
- Place of origin: Japan
- Main ingredients: Gyūhi, bean jam, sugar

Gionbō (祇園坊 or ぎおんぼう) is a wagashi (Japanese sweet). It resembles a dried persimmon, and is now made by filling a gyūhi (a soft form of mochi) with bean jam, then sprinkling white sugar over it.

In the time when sugar was an expensive rarity, dried persimmon, made by drying astringent persimmons (Japanese: shibugaki), was a precious sweetener, and it was very commonly used in many households. At that time, wagashi was made to showcase this fine fruit, and since then it has become one of the most familiar wagashi in Japan.

== See also ==
- Wagashi
- Gionbō-kaki (Gionbō persimmon): a type of astringent seedless Persimmon of a specialty of Akiōta, Hiroshima, Japan. Larger than Saijō persimmon (西条柿).
- Ampo kaki
