= List of registered intangible folk cultural properties =

Registered intangible folk cultural properties (登録無形民俗文化財, tōroku mukei minzoku bunkazai) are a category of the cultural properties of Japan introduced by a 2021 amendment to the 1950 Law for the Protection of Cultural Properties (Chapter V, Articles 90f.).

As of 2 July 2026, nine properties have been registered.

Property	Prefecture	Comments	Image	Ref.
Ōdate Tonburi Production Techniques 大館のとんぶり製造技術; Ōdate no tonburi seizō gijutsu	Akita			
Shōnai Sasamaki Production Techniques 庄内の笹巻製造技術; Shōnai no sasamaki seizō gijutsu	Yamagata			
Noto Ishiru-Ishiri Production Techniques 能登のいしる・いしり製造技術; Noto no ishiru・ishiri seizō gijutsu	Ishikawa			
Tsuruga Oboro-Kombu Production Techniques 敦賀のおぼろ昆布製造技術; Tsuruga no oboro-konbu seizō gijutsu	Fukui			
Ōmi Nare-zushi Production Techniques 近江のなれずし製造技術; Ōmi no nare-zushi seizō gijutsu	Shiga			
Yoshino Kudzu Production Techniques 吉野葛の製造技術; Yoshino-kuzu no seizō gijutsu	Nara			
Sanuki Shōyu Brewing Techniques 讃岐の醤油醸造技術; Sanuki no shōyu jōzō gijutsu	Kagawa			
Tosa-bushi Production Techniques 土佐節の製造技術; Tosa-bushi no seizō gijutsu	Kōchi			
Satsunan Islands Black Sugar Production Techniques 薩南諸島の黒糖製造技術; Satsunan-shotō no kokutō seizō gijutsu	Kagoshima			

== See also ==
- List of important intangible cultural properties
- List of important intangible folk cultural properties
- List of registered intangible cultural properties
