= Hanabiramochi =

Japanese sweet

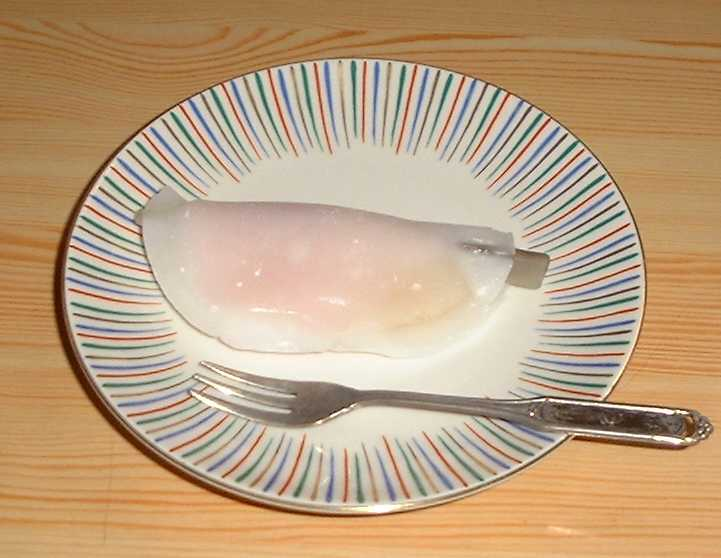
- Type: Wagashi
- Place of origin: Japan
- Main ingredients: Mochi, miso, Gyūhi, burdock

Hanabiramochi (葩餅) is a Japanese sweet (wagashi), usually eaten at the beginning of the year. Hanabiramochi are also served at the first tea ceremony of the new year.

== Origin ==
The name "hanabiramochi" literally means "flower petal mochi". The original form of Hanabiramochi is Hishihanabira, a dessert that was eaten by the Imperial family at special events coinciding with the beginning of the year.

Hanabiramochi was first made in the Meiji Era, and is now a familiar New Year wagashi.

== Form ==
The exact shape of hanabiramochi is strictly defined by tradition. The white mochi covering is flat and round, folded over to form a semicircular shape, and must have a pink color showing through in the center of the confection, fading to a white at the edge. Unlike a daifuku, the mochi must not completely seal the insides.

In the center of a hanabiramochi is a layer of anko, a sweet bean paste, commonly the white kind made from sweetened mung beans. In the very center is a thin strip of sweetly flavoured gobo (burdock), which protrudes from the mochi on both sides.

== Significance and symbolism ==
Each element of the hanabiramochi is significant:

The red colour showing through the white mochi is not only appropriate to the celebration of the new year, but also evokes the Japanese apricot/plum (ume) blossom, which in turn represents the purity, perseverance, and renewal associated with the New Year.

The gobo represents pressed ayu, a fish exclusive to East Asia, and a prayer for a long life.

== See also ==
- Sakuramochi
- Hwajeon
- Japanese New Year
