= Raindrop cake =

Japanese dessert

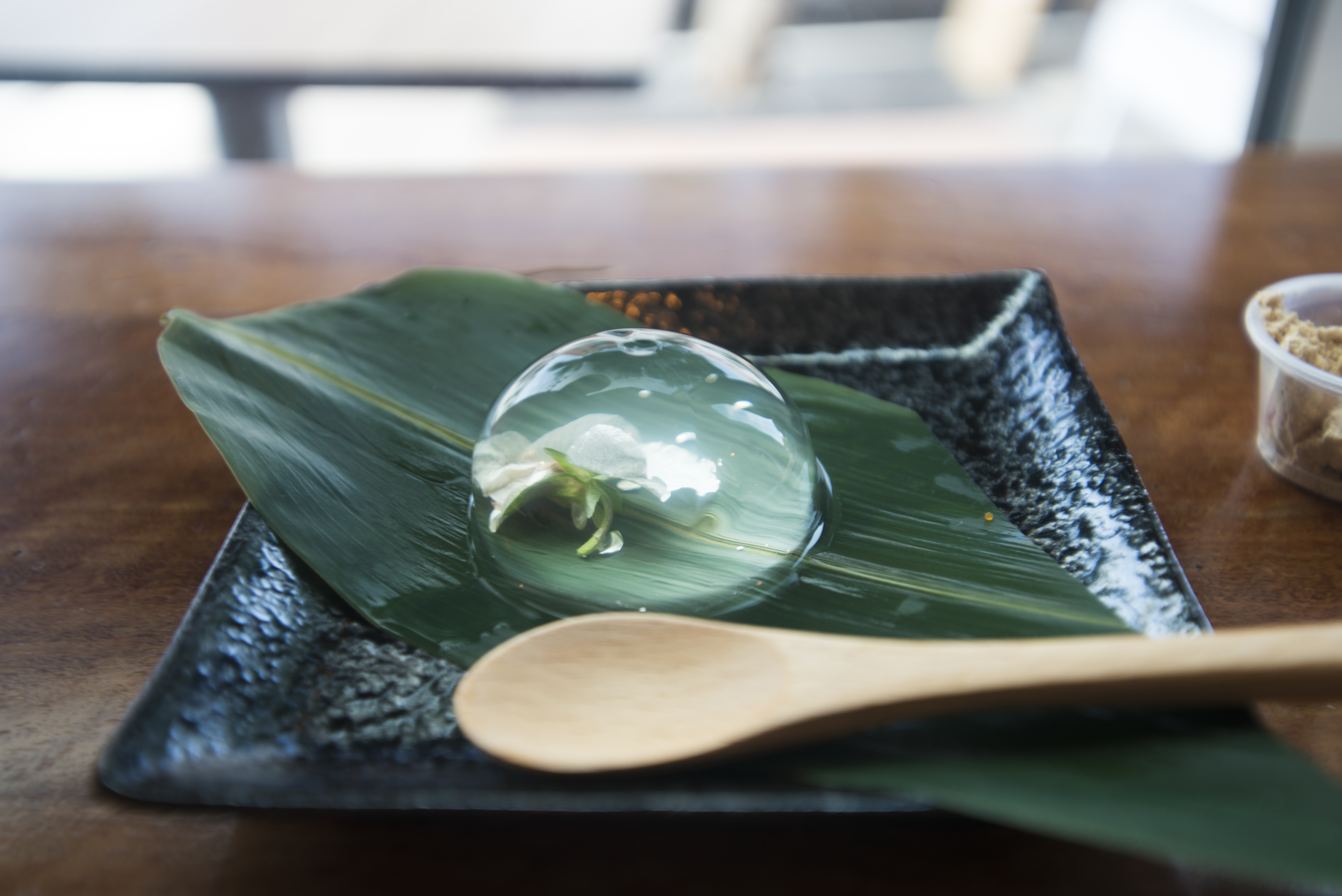
- Type: Wagashi (confection)
- Place of origin: Japan
- Main ingredients: Water, agar

Raindrop cake is a wagashi (Japanese confection) made of water and agar that resembles a large raindrop. It first became popular in Japan in 2014 and later gained international attention.

== History ==
In Japan the dessert is known as mizu shingen mochi (水信玄餅). The dish is an evolution of the Japanese dessert shingen mochi (信玄餅). Shingen mochi was developed in the 1960s and inspired by the locally made abekawa mochi (安倍川餅), which is traditionally eaten during the Obon festival in Yamanashi and Shizuoka prefectures.

Shingen mochi, like abekawa mochi, is mochi (rice cake) covered with kinako (roasted soybean flour) and brown sugar syrup. It is named after Takeda Shingen, a famous daimyo who ruled over Yamanashi during the Sengoku era. He is said to have used mochi which consisted of rice flour and sugar as an emergency ration during the warring periods.

=== Mizu shingen mochi ===
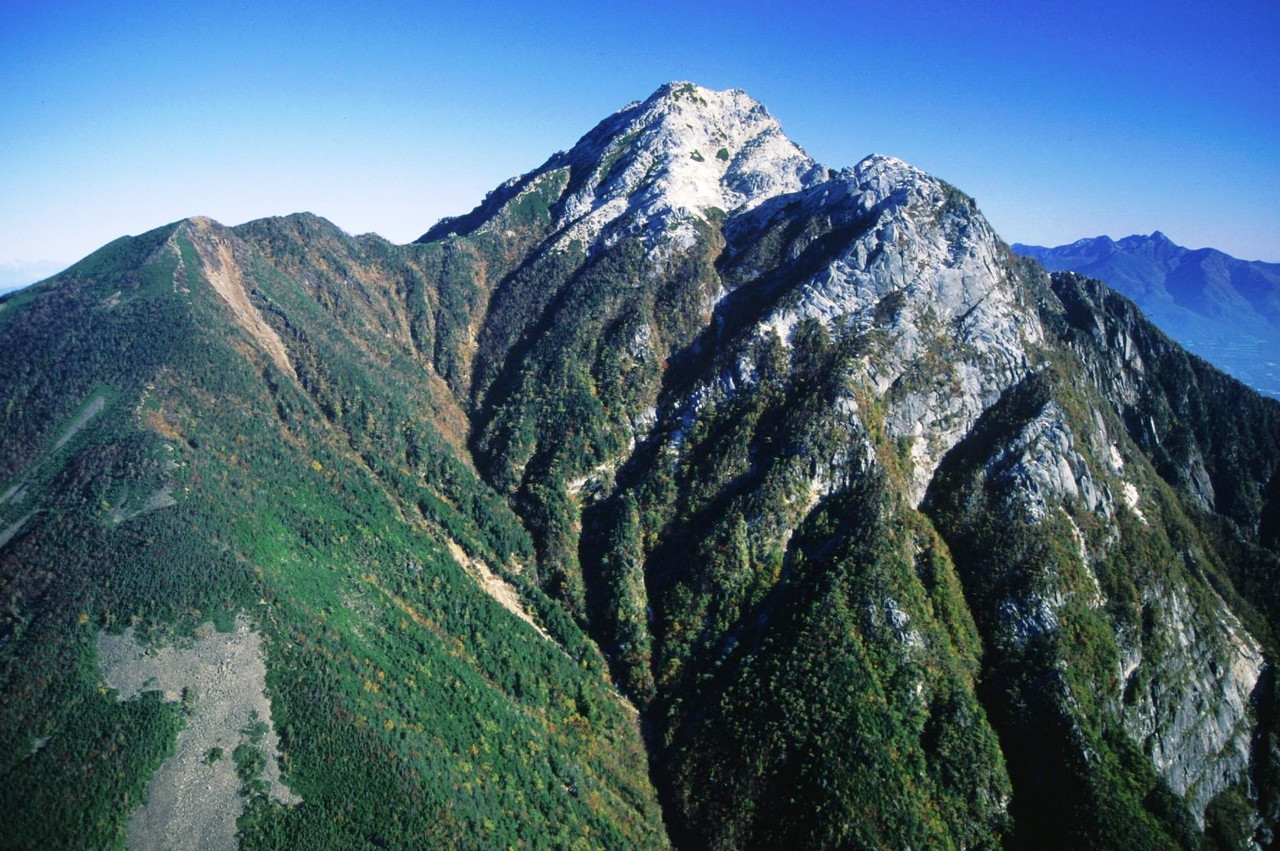
Mount Kaikoma, the water source of mizu shingen mochi

Kinseiken came up with the idea of mizu shingen mochi. The company is located in Hakushu, Yamanashi, which is known for its fresh mineral water. The area is one of the largest producers of mineral water in Japan.

Mizu (水) means water and shingen mochi (信玄餅) is a type of mochi made by the Kinseiken company. In 2013, the creator wanted to explore the idea of making edible water. The dessert became a viral phenomenon and people made special trips to the region to experience the dish.

Darren Wong introduced the dish to the United States in New York City at the April 2016 Smorgasburg food fair. Shortly after, London restaurant Yamagoya worked four months to develop another version. The dessert is also sold in kits to be made at home.

== Description ==
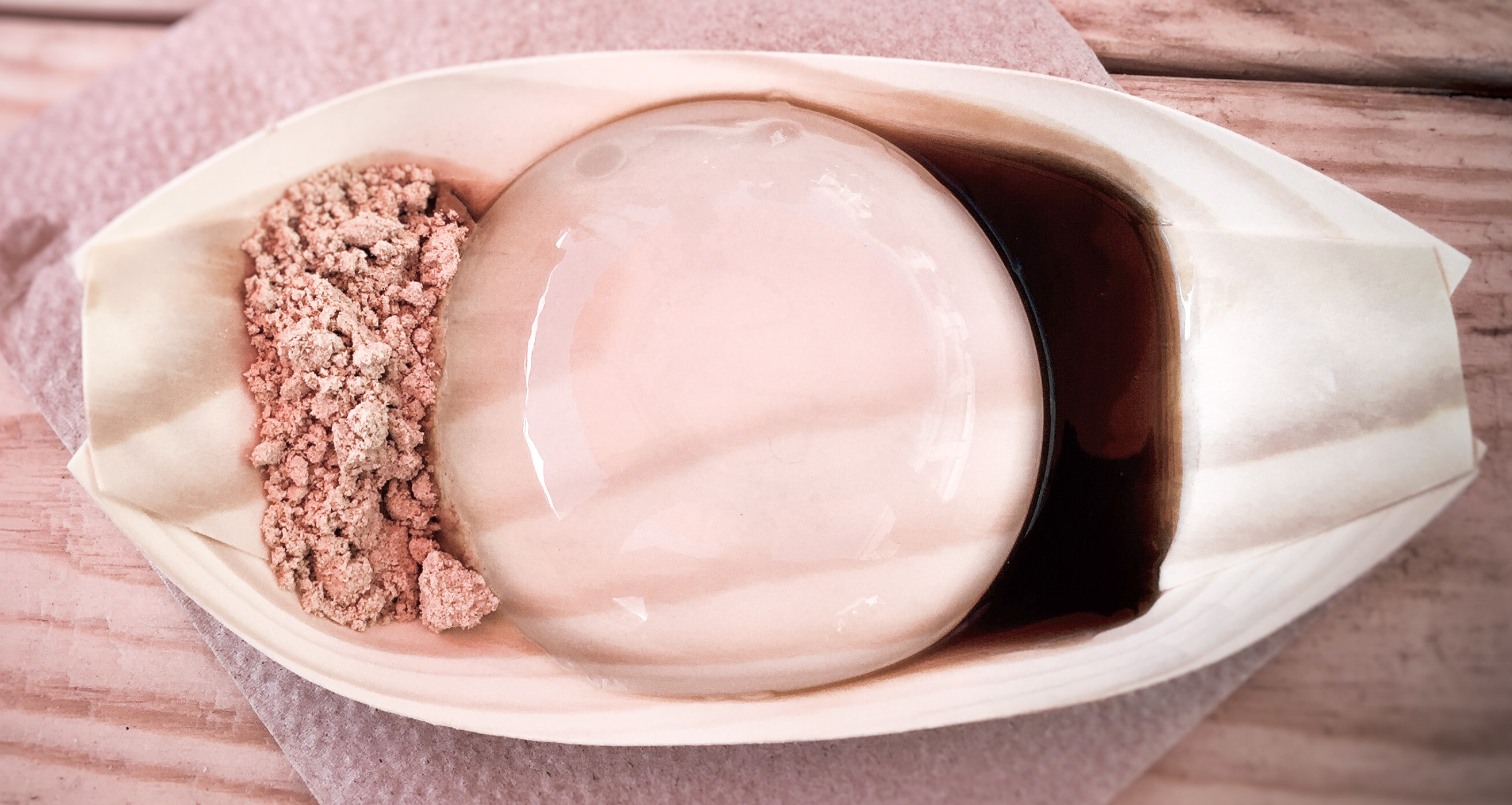
Raindrop cake with kinako and kuromitsu

The dish is made from mineral water and agar; thus, it has virtually no calories. The water of the original dish is obtained from Mount Kaikoma of the Southern Japanese Alps, and it has been described as having a mildly sweet taste. Agar is a vegan alternative to gelatin that is made from seaweed.

After heating the water and agar, the liquid is molded and cooled. A molasses-like syrup, called kuromitsu, and soybean flour, called kinako, are used as toppings. The dish appears like a transparent raindrop, although it has also been compared to breast implants and jellyfish. The largely tasteless dessert melts when it enters the mouth and must be eaten immediately, or it will melt and begin to evaporate after twenty to thirty minutes.

== See also ==
- Japanese cuisine
- List of Japanese desserts and sweets
