= Tojiko mame =

Japanese confectionery

Tojiko mame (とじこ豆) is a traditional confectionery from Kyushu, Japan, particularly associated with Kumamoto Prefecture.

== Overview ==
Tojiko mame is a local sweet mainly produced and consumed in Kumamoto Prefecture. It consists of a sweet dough made from wheat flour and sugar, into which roasted soybeans or peanuts are mixed. The mixture is shaped and firmed up using a bamboo mat, then cut into slices approximately one centimeter wide before serving.

This confection is commonly prepared for annual events and festivals, and in the Kikuka area of Yamaga City, Kumamoto, it is a staple treat served at ceremonial occasions such as weddings and funerals, as well as during New Year celebrations alongside other festive foods. Originally, Tojiko-mame was made as a preserved food for farmers, serving as a snack during busy farming seasons or as a gift. Traditionally, it was also enjoyed toasted over a charcoal fire.

The recipe and ingredients can vary by region and household. While the dough is typically sweetened with brown sugar, other types of sugar such as refined sugar or cane sugar, or blends thereof, may also be used to enhance the flavor. Although roasted soybeans were originally the standard ingredient, peanuts, which provide a pleasant crunch, have become increasingly common in recent years.

== Etymology ==
The name "Tojiko-mame" is derived from the Japanese words meaning "to enclose beans" within the sweet wheat-flour dough. Alternative pronunciations include "Tochiko-mame" and "Toshiko-mame."

== Ingredients ==
Typical ingredients include:

- Wheat flour
- Sugar (brown sugar, refined sugar, cane sugar, or blends)
- Roasted soybeans (or peanuts as a substitute)
- Water
- Oil
- Bamboo leaves (for wrapping)

Note: In some households or regions, yuzu citrus or ginger is added to the dough for extra flavor.

=== Preparation ===
1. Heat sugar and water in a pot until the sugar dissolves. Add roasted soybeans (or peanuts) and cook until softened.
2. Add wheat flour and mix, kneading the dough thoroughly.
3. Heat oil in a frying pan and continue kneading the dough until it becomes translucent.
4. Wrap the kneaded dough in bamboo leaves and steam until finished.

Alternatively, a simplified method involves shaping the dough using a bamboo mat without steaming.
