= Suama =

Japanese sweet

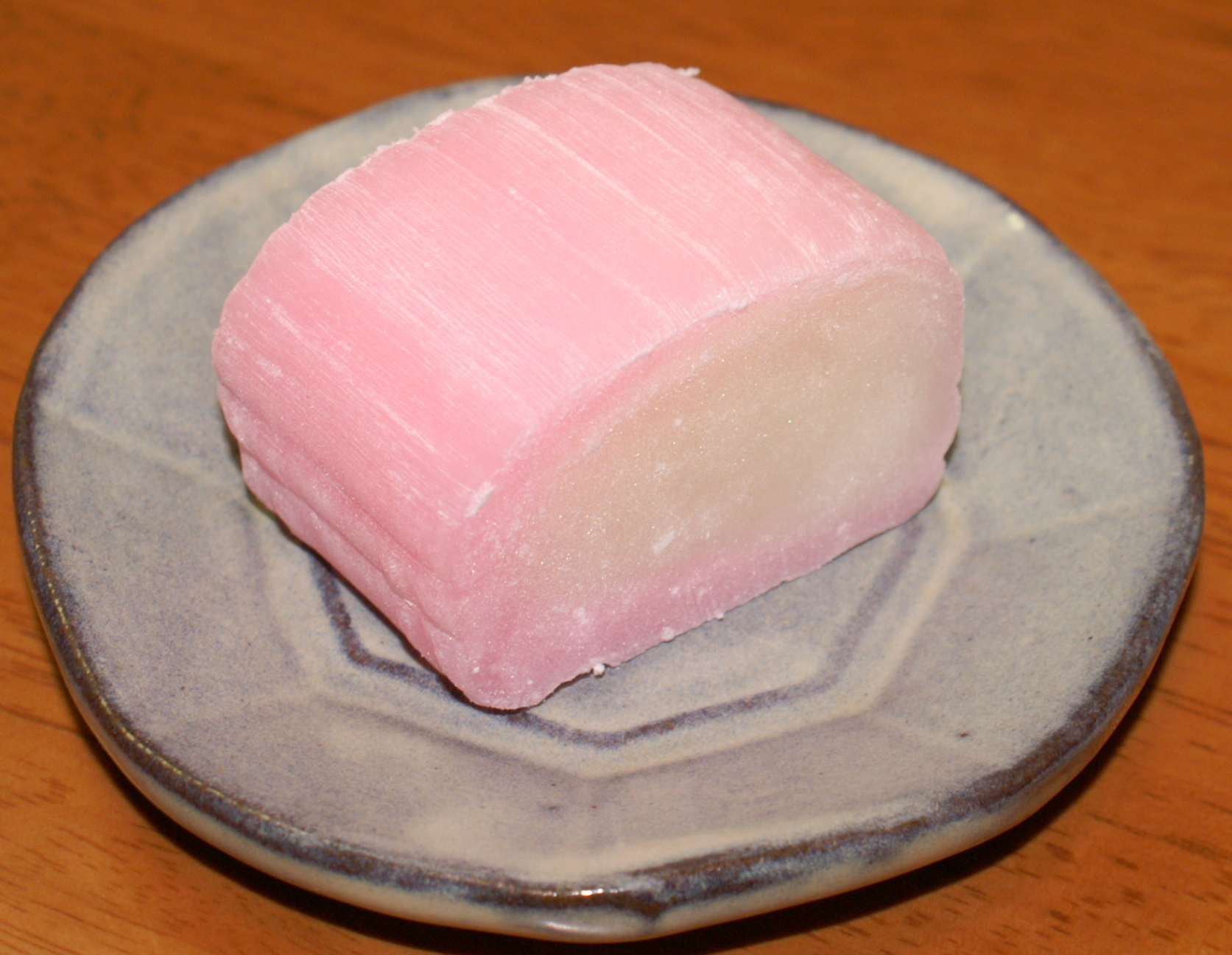
- Type: Wagashi
- Place of origin: Japan
- Main ingredients: Non-glutinous rice flour, hot water, sugar, red food dye

Suama (寿甘), a combination of the kanji for celebration "su" (寿) and sweet "ama" (甘), is a Japanese sweet made of non-glutinous rice flour, hot water, and sugar characterized by its red food dye. It is dyed red, because red and white symbolize celebration in Japanese tradition. It is kneaded and then optionally shaped by a sushi rolling mat (sudare), which gives the final product a textured, slightly bumpy surface.

Suama is similar to, but not the same as, two other rice-based Japanese snacks, mochi and uirō. Mochi uses glutinous rice flour; while uirō is not kneaded, but rather mixed, placed in a mold, and steamed.

== See also ==
- Japanese cuisine
- Wagashi
