= Hakuto jelly =

Japanese dessert

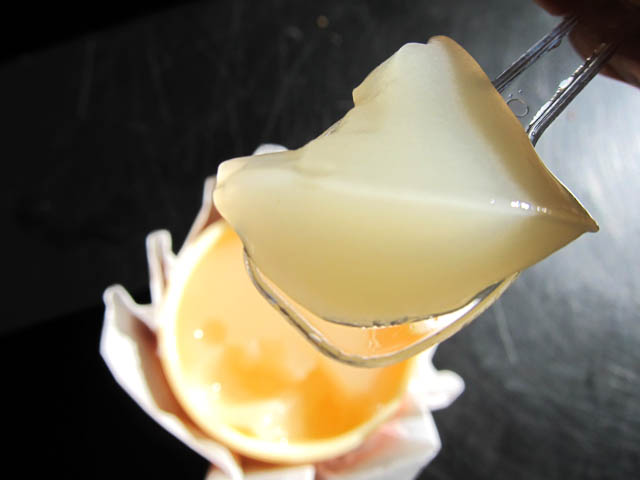
- Hakuto peach jelly
- Course: Dessert
- Place of origin: Japan
- Serving temperature: Cold
- Main ingredients: Hakuto peaches, spring water

Hakuto jelly (白桃ゼリー) is a seasonal Japanese dessert available in the summer. It is made using the juice of ripe hakuto peaches from Okayama and mineral-rich spring water. The texture is very smooth and soft, similar to the texture of the fruit itself. It has a light floral/peach aroma and taste. Hakuto jelly often comes in a container designed like the peach it was made from. Hakuto jelly can either be cut into cubes and served as such, or eaten with a spoon from the container. It is best served as a cold dish. Because it is a seasonal dessert, the taste of hakuto jelly differs slightly every year as the peaches do each season. Due to the quality of the peaches used to create it, hakuto jelly is very expensive.
