= Fusen gum =

Brand of chewing gum

Fusen Gum
- Type: Bubble gum
- Place of origin: Japan
- Food energy (per serving): 117 kcal (490 kJ)

Fūsen Gum (風船; balloon) is a brand of bubble gum manufactured by Japanese confectionery manufacturer Marukawa.

The product is exported around the world and is particularly popular in Kuwait, Bahrain, Oman, United Arab Emirates, Saudi Arabia, Qatar, Iran, Pakistan, and India. Fūsen is notable for the water-based temporary tattoo included in the product's wrapper, which comes in two styles and a variety of designs. The ingredients include sugar, gum base, glucose, corn syrup, artificial flavouring substances, citric acid, and added colors (including grape skin extracts). Each unit weighs 0.147 oz (4.15 g).

== Distribution ==
The brand is a private label exclusively distributed by Al Mahasen General Trading LLC, a Dubai-based trading company founded by brothers Ali and Khalil Hashemi.
