= Higashi (food) =

Type of wagashi

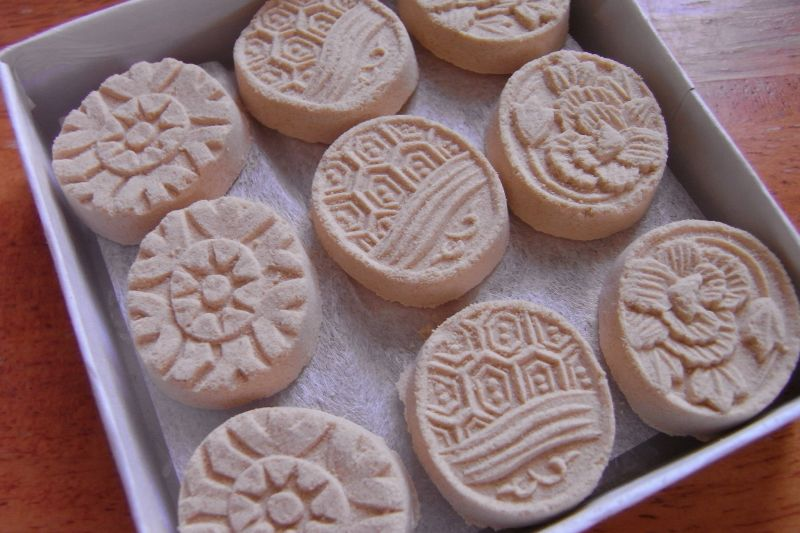
- Type: Wagashi
- Place of origin: Japan
- Main ingredients: Usually rice flour
- Variations: Goshikiitō (bainiku, hakka, nikkei, shōga, yuzu), hakusansekkei, hanakazura, mugirakushizuka, nininsuzuka, rakugan, Shigure no Matsu, suiko

Higashi (干菓子・乾菓子, lit. 'dry confectionery') or higasi is a type of wagashi containing very little moisture, and thus keeps relatively longer than other kinds of wagashi.

== Overview ==
Higashi, in contrast to namagashi, are a category of wagashi with any type of dry consistency. This can include rakugan, konpeitō (a type of hard candy), senbei (a type of rice cracker), arare (another type of rice cracker), and so on, though rice crackers are typically savoury, and thus not considered wagashi. Sweet higashi are roughly equivalent to Western cookies or biscuits.

A narrower definition of higashi may confine the recipe to one or more kinds of sugar, with a particular sort of flour, and some other additives, while there are some higashi made solely of sugar, with no flour content.

The flour used in higashi is usually made of rice, which has many different varieties of its own. Flours made of other ingredients, like azuki, soybean or green pea and starches are often used too.

Higashi made with wasanbon, Japanese premium traditionally-made fine-grained sugar, are commonly regarded as the finest higashi. The most common and well-known higashi is rakugan, but the definition of the word is somewhat vague and sometimes not suitable for a certain type of wagashi, so the word higashi would be better in some cases.

Higashi are often served at Japanese tea ceremonies.

== List of higashi ==
- Goshikiitō (五色糖) – Five flavors: bainiku (pickled plum), hakka (Japanese mint), nikkei (cinnamon), shōga (ginger), and yuzu (citron), each with distinct shapes.
- Hakusansekkei (白山雪渓)
- Hanakazura (花かずら)
- Mugirakushizuka (麦らく静)
- Nininsuzuka (二人静)
- Rakugan (落雁)
- Shigure no matsu (時雨の松)
- Suiko (推古) – Aka (pinkish red) and shiro (white) are available.
