= Wasanbon =

Japanese fine-grained sugar

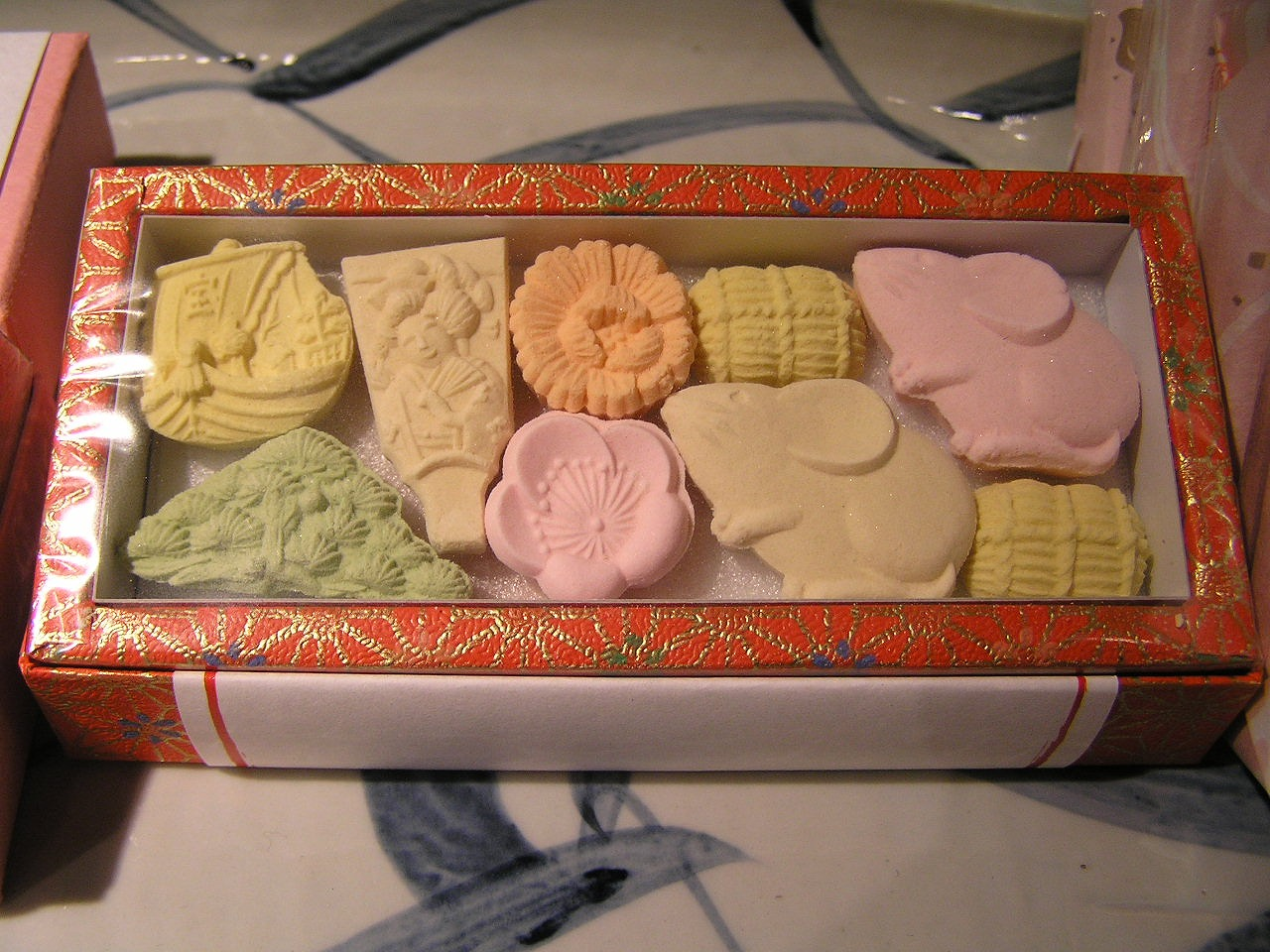
- Type: Sugar
- Place of origin: Japan
- Region or state: Tokushima Prefecture; Kagawa Prefecture; Shikoku
- Main ingredients: Sugarcane plants (taketō or chikusha)

Wasanbon (和三盆) is a fine-grained Japanese sugar, traditionally made in the Shikoku prefectures of Tokushima and Kagawa, centered to the towns of Kamiita-cho and Donari-cho in Tokushima, where it has been made since about the 1770s. The sugar is often used for Japanese sweets (wagashi). The sugar is made from thin sugarcane plants (Saccharum sinense) grown locally in Shikoku, called taketō (竹糖) or chikusha (竹蔗) (locally known as hosokiki).

== Use ==
It is a light golden colour, with granules slightly larger than icing sugar, and has a unique aroma and flavour, with butter and honey overtones. Wasanbon is used in making sweets and yōkan, as a coffee and tea sweetener, in dipping sauces at sushi restaurants, and in baking at home.

A grade of the sugar called "awa wasanbon toh" is considered by some people to be the highest grade.

== Production ==
The traditional manufacturing process of wasanbon involves 8 stages, and takes roughly 20 days as a whole. The sugarcane is harvested between December and February. It is harvested late in the year on purpose, to allow the sugar content of the cane to develop to its maximum, as the variety of sugarcane used produces less sugar than other varieties used elsewhere in the world.

The cane is pressed by machine to extract its juice. The juice goes into a tank; the crushed canes are used as cattle fodder, or fertilizer. The juice is then brought to a boil and boiled for about 30 minutes, producing a green foam, which is removed, as it contains a bitter green lye.

At the end of this process, the juice is a light yellow coloured, and is allowed to stand to allow sediment to settle to the bottom. The clarified juice is drained off, then boiled again to condense it, then cooled. The juice develops a light brown colour. It is allowed to stand for one week, during which time it mostly solidifies into crystalline masses. These solids are wrapped in a cloth and squeezed in a pressing tub for a day to press liquid out of those solidified pieces.

The pieces are then washed and kneaded with water 4 or 5 times, to refine the sugar in them and make it whiter.

The pieces are then dried quickly so that the sugar does not ferment, and then crushed and sieved into a fine sugar.

== See also ==
- Sugar in Japan
