= Namagashi =

Type of wagashi

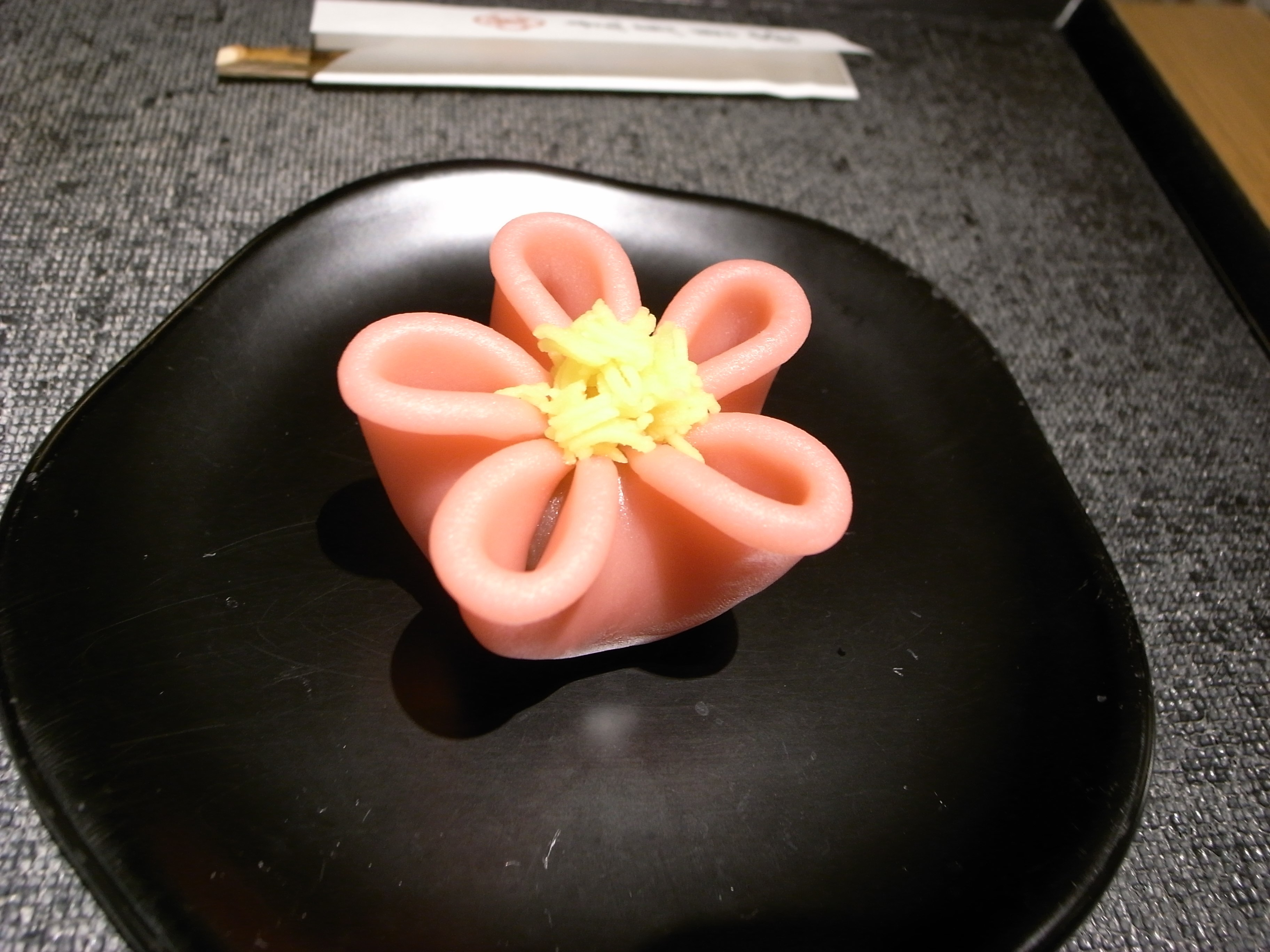
- Namagashi in Yokohama, Japan.
- Type: Wagashi
- Place of origin: Japan
- Main ingredients: Most commonly, fruit jellies or sweetened bean paste
- Variations: Han namagashi, which is half-cooked and less moist

Namagashi (生菓子) are a type of wagashi, which is a general term for traditional Japanese sweets and candies. Namagashi may contain fruit jellies, other gelatines such as Kanten, or sweetened bean paste. Namagashi are often detailed, designed using seasonal and natural motifs such as leaves and flowers to reflect the various objects of nature in Japan's four seasons. Namagashi are usually freshly made and are much more moist than other wagashi, like higashi. It generally contains 30% more water than other types. Like other wagashi, namagashi are made of natural ingredients; additives are rarely used. Namagashi is generally served with tea, and it's traditionally eaten on New Year's for good luck.

== See also ==
- Higashi
