= Mizuame =

Japanese starch-based sweetener

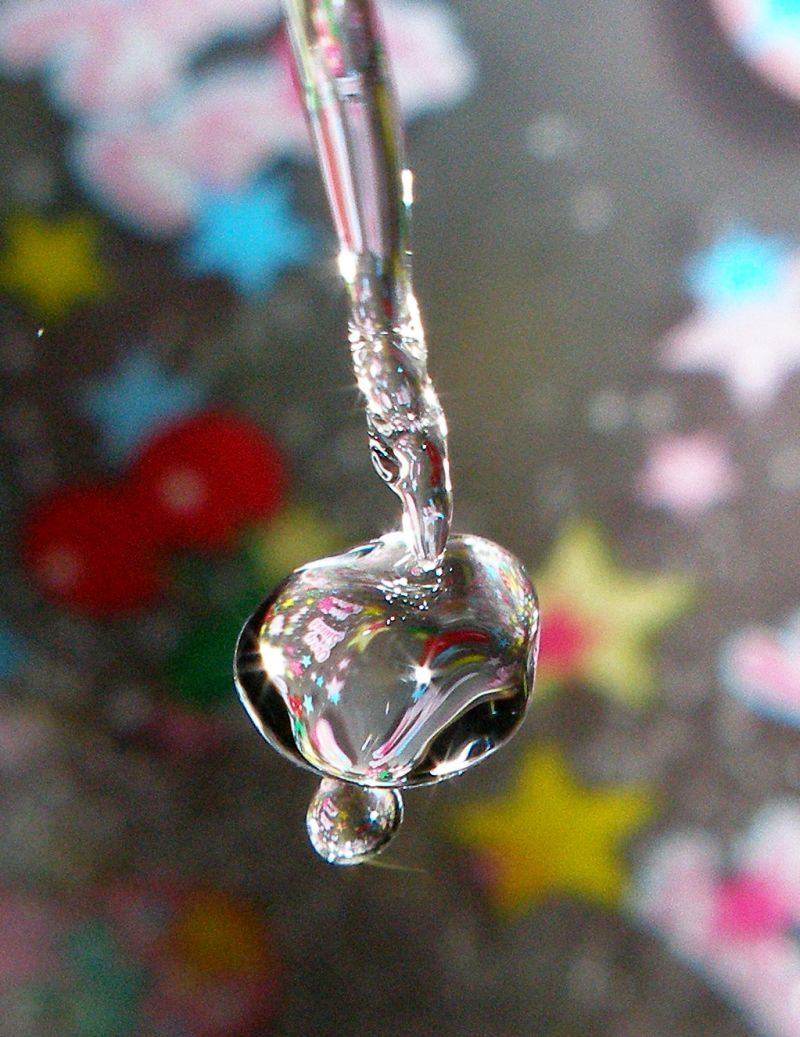
- Type: Sweetener
- Place of origin: Japan
- Main ingredients: Glutinous rice and malt or potatoes

Mizuame (水飴, literally "water candy", also known as millet jelly) is a Japanese sweetener. It is a clear, thick, sticky liquid and is made by converting starch to sugars. Mizuame is added to traditional Japanese confections called wagashi to give them a sheen. It is eaten in ways similar to honey and can be a main ingredient in sweets. Some mizuame are similar to corn syrup in both production process and taste.

Two methods are used to convert the starches to sugars. The traditional method uses glutinous rice mixed with malt and lets the natural enzymatic process convert the starch to a syrup consisting mainly of maltose. The more common method is acid hydrolysis of potato starch or sweet potato starch by adding acid, such as hydrochloric, sulfuric or nitric acids, to make glucose syrup. The resulting product from the traditional method is known as malt mizuame (麦芽水飴) and is considered more flavorful than the version made by acid hydrolysis. A similar product is called reduced starch syrup, which is a sweetener whose main ingredient is sugar alcohols processed from mizuame.

== Consumption ==
Mizuame can be eaten on its own. It was an essential part of Japanese street theater known as kamishibai, where children would stir the syrup with disposable chopsticks and eat it while playing. This was popular until around the 1960s.

It is also used as a cooking ingredient. It served as a main sweetener in Japan before sugar was introduced, and is still used today in traditional Japanese sweets. Some confections feature mizuame as one of the key ingredients, such as nanbu senbei, a rice cracker snack where the syrup is sandwiched between two pieces of rice cracker, and rakugan, a dry, molded sweet.

Mizuame is not classified as a food additive, but is often used like one due to its unique properties. It inhibits sugar crystallization, which helps to maintain a smooth texture in sugary foods. It also retains moisture and adds a glossy finish to Japanese sweets and dishes like teriyaki.

== Herbal candy ==
Malt mizuame is made primarily from glutinous rice and processed using enzymes found in malt juice that promote saccharification. This is dried and powdered to produce kouai, a substance used in certain traditional Japanese medicine, or kampo. Its main component is maltose, though other compounds are also present.

Herbal medicines that include mizuame as a key ingredient include Shokenchuto and Daikenchuto, in which it accounts for roughly half the total weight of the formula. Other examples include preparations like Ogikenchuto.

While mizuame is not typically used on its own in kampo, it is believed to have nourishing and strengthening properties, particularly for the stomach. One theory suggests that these benefits may stem from maltose’s influence on the intestinal flora.

== See also ==
- Barley malt syrup
- Brown rice syrup
- Corn syrup
- List of syrups
- Maltose
