= Gyūhi =

Traditional Japanese sweet

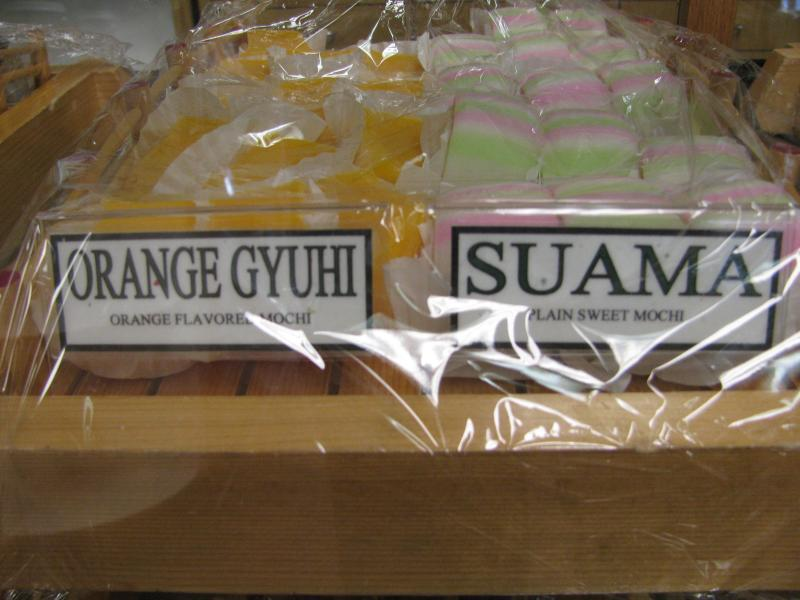
- Orange gyuhi (left) and suama (right)
- Type: Wagashi
- Place of origin: Japan
- Main ingredients: Glutinous rice or mochiko

Gyūhi (求肥) is a form of wagashi (traditional Japanese sweets). Gyūhi is a softer variety of mochi (餅), and both are made from either glutinous rice or from mochiko (餅粉, glutinous rice flour).

Because gyūhi is more delicate, it is usually less frequently made and served than mochi. It is sometimes featured in sweets that originated in the Kyoto area. Tinted gyūhi is the base of matsunoyuki, a wagashi that resembles a pine tree dusted with snow.

Gyūhi is also used as an ingredient in other wagashi such as nerikiri, which is made of a blend of gyūhi and shiroan, a white bean-based version of anko. Nerikiri is often tinted and molded in ways similar to the treatment of marzipan in Western desserts.

== Hyōroku mochi ==
Hyōroku mochi is a type of candy which is made and sold by Seika Foods in Kagoshima. This is made of gyūhi.
