= Kimia (disambiguation) =

Kimia or Kimiya is a Persian feminine given name. It may also refer to:

- Kimia (given name)
- Kimia Khatoon, Persian language novel by Saideh Ghods
- Kimia Farma, Indonesian pharmaceutical producer and distributor
- Kimia Aqqala F.C., or Shohadaye Aqqala F.C., Iranian football club
- Kimia (fly), a genus of flies in the family Culicidae

== See also ==
- Kimiya (Japanese given name)
