= Uirō (Japanese medicine) =

Japanese traditional medicine

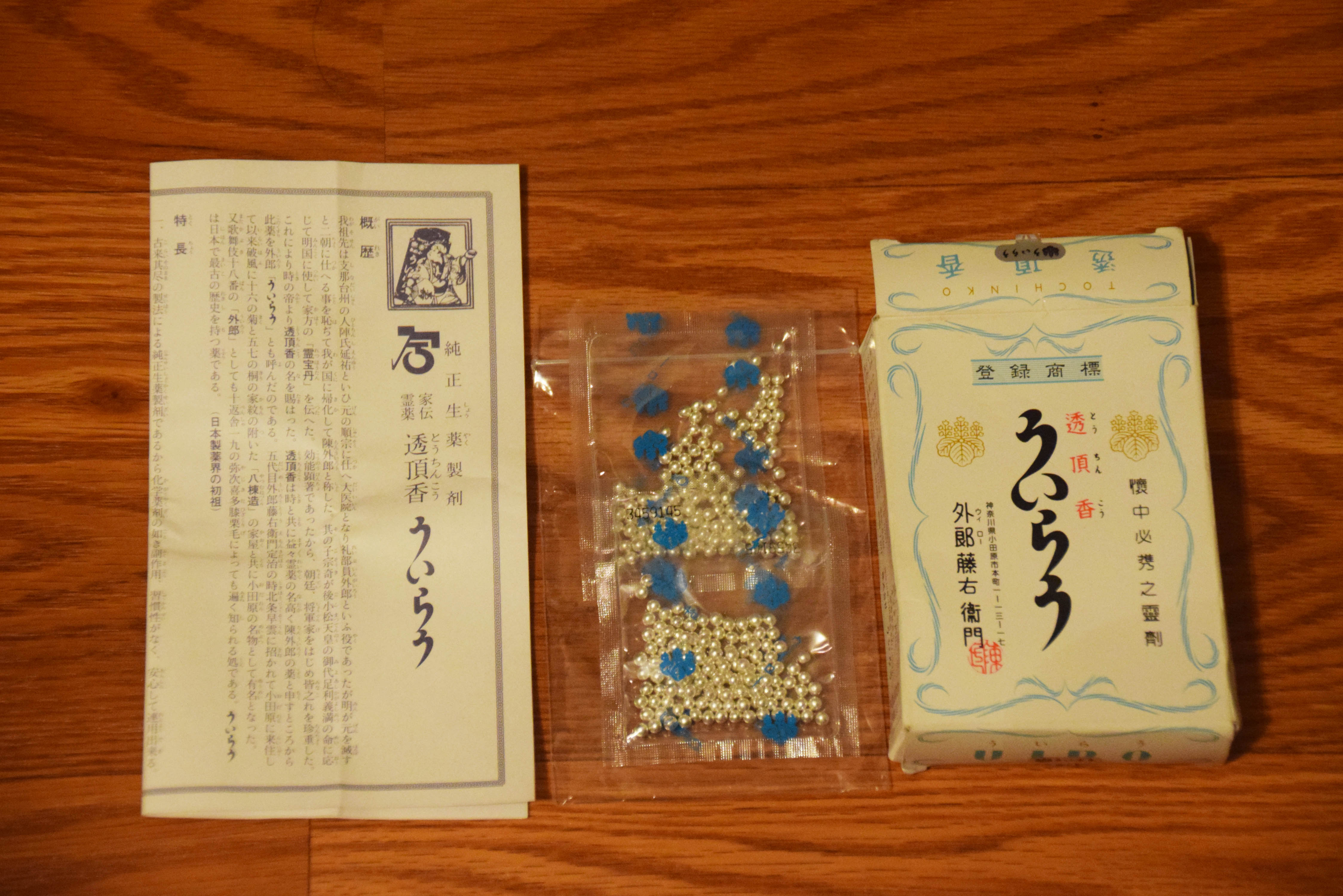
A typical package of Uirō Medicine

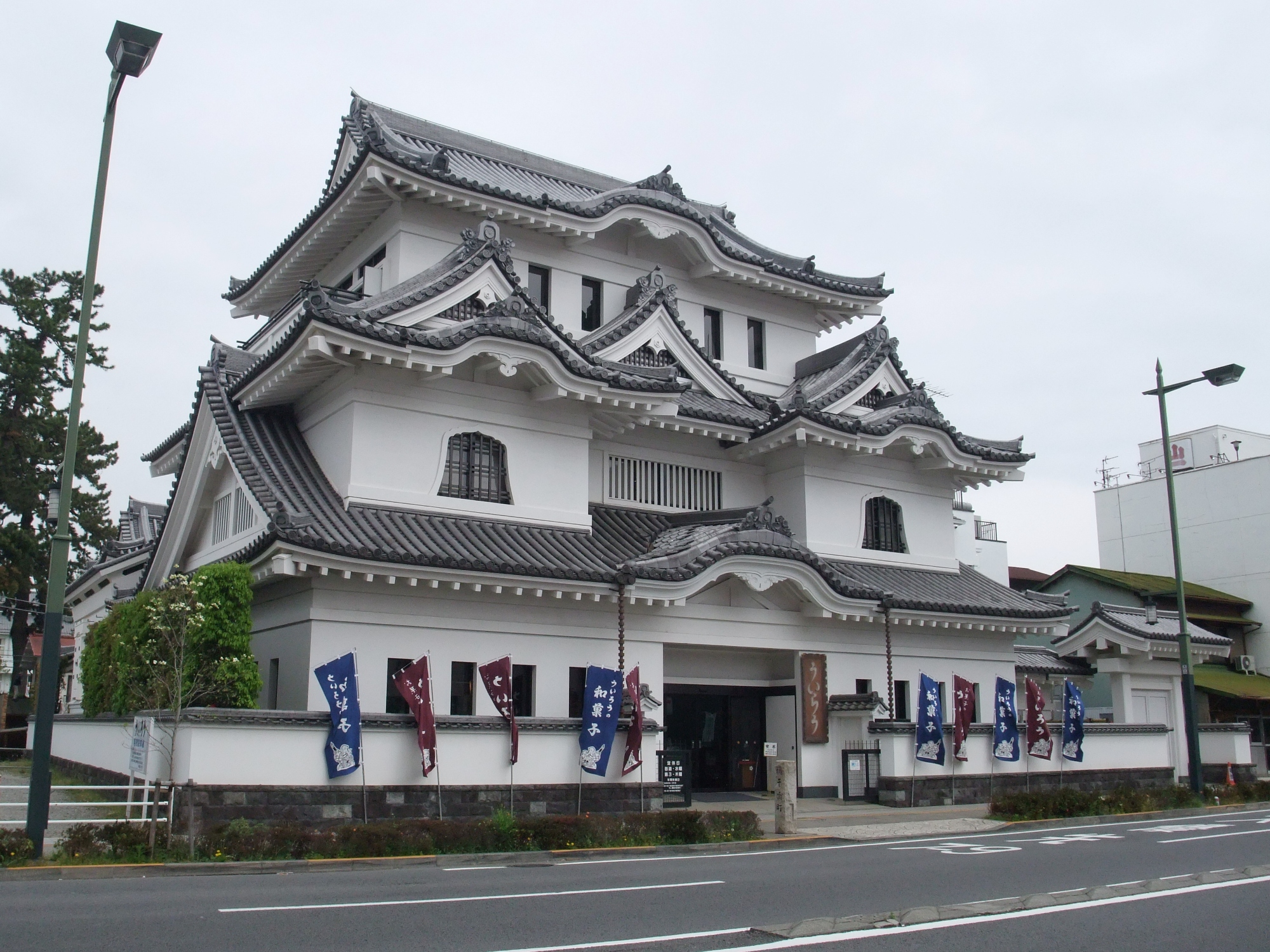
The Headquarters of Uirō Co., Ltd., Odawara

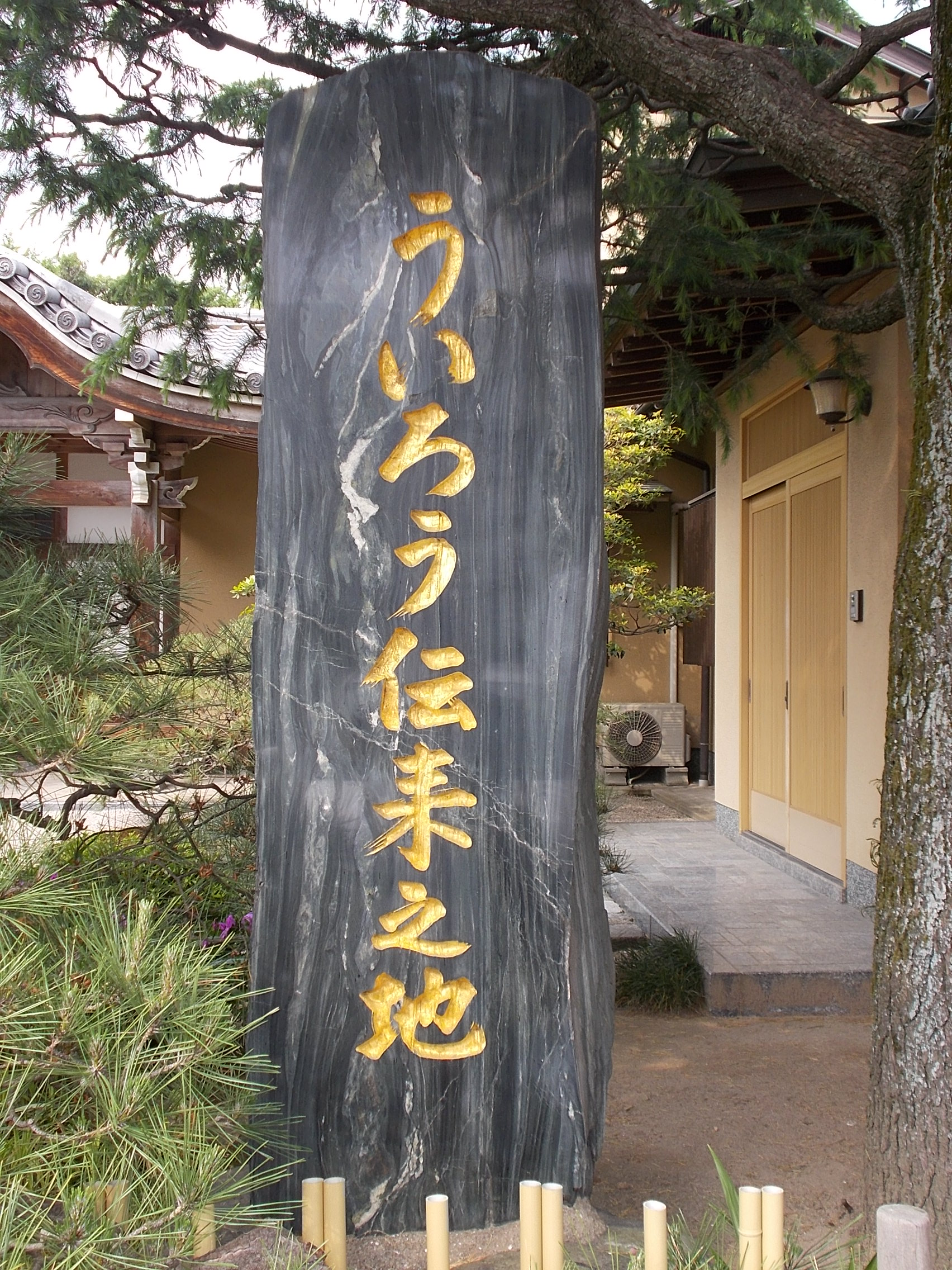
The stone monument commemorating the birth of Uirō at Myōraku-ji Temple, Hakata-ku, Fukuoka

Uirō (Japanese: ういらう or 外郎) sold by Uirō Company in Odawara, Kanagawa, usually is a well-known traditional Japanese medicine.

== Origin of uirō ==
The origin of uirō in Odawara goes back to 14th-century China. Chin En-yū (陳延祐, Chen Yanyou in Mandarin Chinese), a medical doctor in Taizhou, Zhejiang Province, moved to Japan as the Yuan Dynasty was replaced by the Ming Dynasty. He arrived in Hakata, and practiced medicine, calling himself Chin Gairō (陳外郎, Chen Wailang), using the title of his Yuan Dynasty government. He was invited several times to Kyoto to serve Ashikaga Yoshimitsu, the shōgun, but he declined. He later became a Buddhist monk, assumed the name of Sokei (宗敬), and died in Hakata.

His son, Sōki (宗奇), moved to Kyoto, and was sent to his father's home town of Taizhou, China. He brought the recipe for Reihōtan medicine (霊宝丹), which was such an effective medicine for many diseases that it was given the name of "Tōchinkō" (透頂香) by the emperor because of its special fragrance. It was also called Uirō, an alternative of the Zhejiang pronunciation of "Wailang", the government title of his father. Sōki entertained foreign guests with special cakes, which were called "Uirō cakes".

Jōyu, Sōki's son, was a man of high esteem. His son, Soden (祖田), was also so respected that Soden's eldest son, Sadaharu (定治), was given the family name of Uno (宇野) by shōgun Ashikaga Yoshimasa. Uno Sadaharu moved to Odawara in 1504 at the invitation of Hojo Soun and the descendants of Chin Gairō have made Uirō medicine there ever since.

Recent research shows that Uirō medicine was available in both Kyoto and Odawara until the Genroku Period of the late 17th century. Uirō cakes became available in Odawara during the Meiji Period in the late 19th century.

== Medicine ==
Uirō medicine comes in small silvery pills, much like Jintan pills. A typical package contains 428 pills in three plastic bags. It is considered a good remedy for stomachache, headache, giddiness, and other routine conditions. Its ingredients include ginseng, musk, borneol, and cinnamon bark.

== In Japanese culture ==
There are two famous mentions on Odawara's Uirō in the Japanese literature,

=== Uirō salesman in Kabuki ===
"Uirō Salesman" (Japanese: 外郎売り) is one of the Eighteen Popular Kabuki Scenes. It is from the Soga Brothers' Revenge, and is one of the brothers' rapid sales talk about the Uirō medicine and its merits.

=== Yaji and Kita's stay at Odawara Station ===
Jippensha Ikku wrote a famous, funny story of Yaji and Kita through the 53 stations of the old Tokaido Road, from Edo to Kyoto in Tōkaidōchū Hizakurige, published between 1802 and 1822. At Odawara Station, they buy Uirō, thinking it is a cake, but find it is medicine.

== See also ==
- Uirō (Japanese cakes sold in Nagoya and other cities)
- Jintan (Japanese medicine)
