= Matsukawaya Company =

Japanese confectionery company

- Native name: 松河屋老舗
- Industry: confectionery products
- Headquarters: 4-9-27, Sakae, Naka-ku 460-0008, Nagoya, Japan
- Area served: Aichi Prefecture and Washington, DC, USA
- Key people: Yoshitaka Nishino (CEO and head wagashi chef); Hisao Minabe, (Grand Master wagashi maker)
- Website: www.matsukawaya.jp

Matsukawaya Co., Ltd. (松河屋老舗) is a Japanese confectionery company that makes wagashi (和菓子, wa-gashi).

== History ==
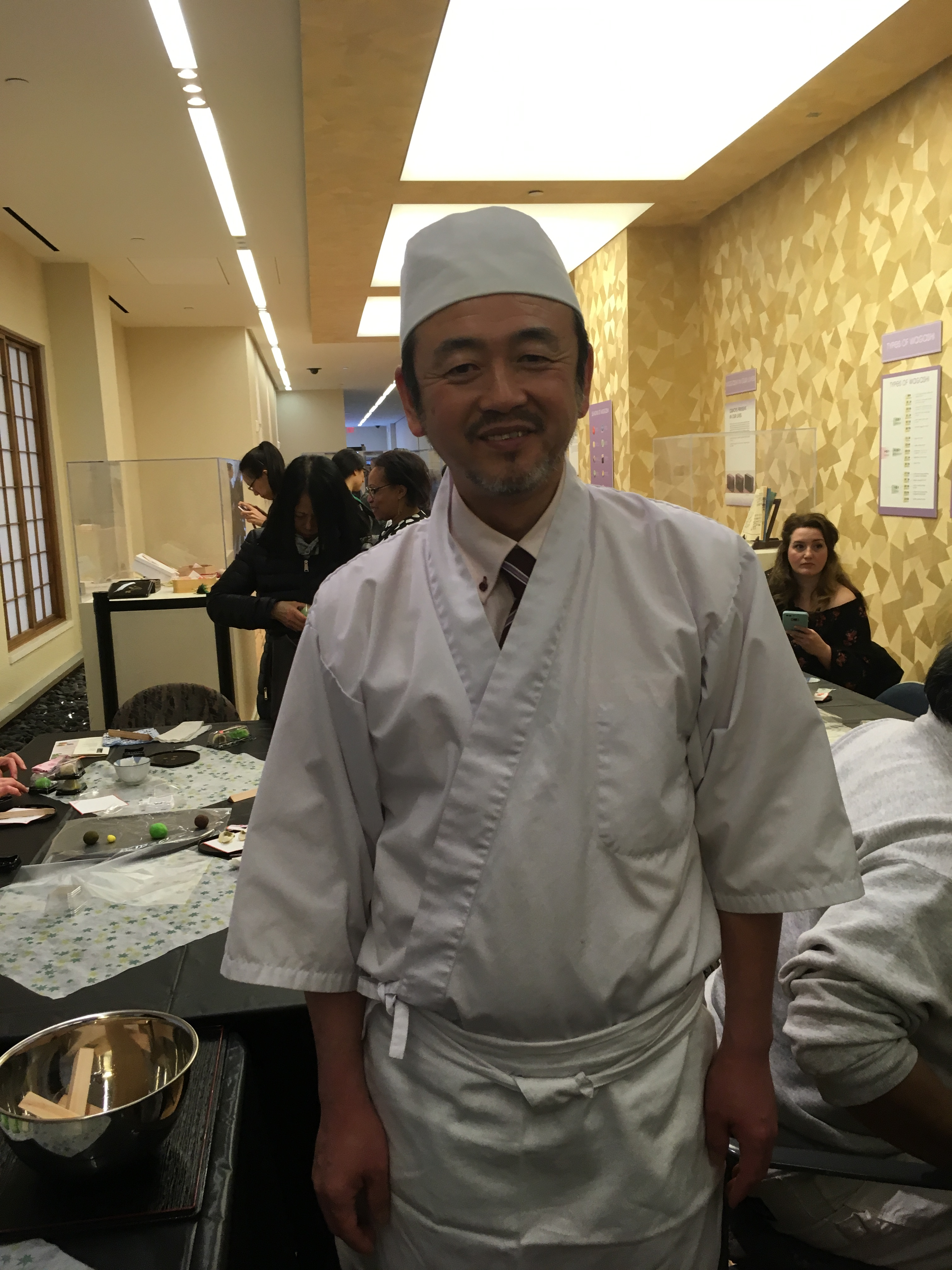
On February 26, 2018, in Washington DC, wagashi master chefs and members of the Matsukawaya Company made a hands-on presentation about the making a wagashi.

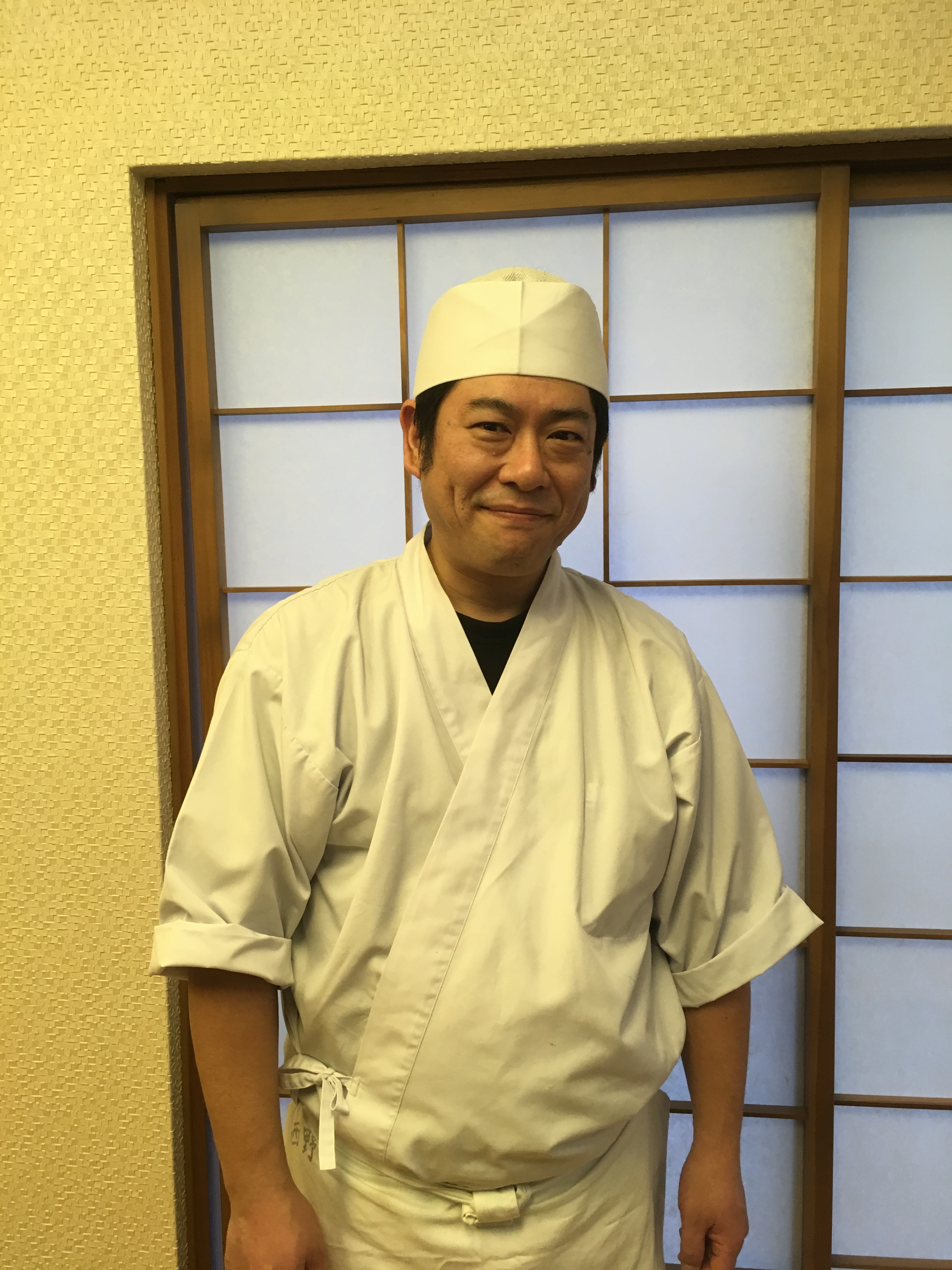
On February 26, 2018, in Washington DC, wagashi master chefs and members of the Matsukawaya Company made a hands-on presentation about the making a wagashi.

It was founded in 1862 in Nagoya, Japan. Currently, Yoshitaka Nishino is the CEO.
