= Yogashi =

Japanese confectionery

A strawberry shortcake, a type of yogashi

Yogashi (Japanese: 洋菓子, Hepburn: yōgashi) is a Western-style confectionery made in Japan. In comparison with wagashi (和菓子), yogashi incorporates dairy products, wheat flour, and fat. Beginning in the late 19th century, yogashi makers were known for working in better conditions than wagashi or dagashi makers. Fūgetsudō was the leading producer of yogashi until 1913, when it was taken over by Morinaga. Tokyo Confectionery (Meiji) soon joined them, becoming Morinaga's rival. The Japanese government has promoted yogashi in the early 20th century, saying that it was better than wagashi. By the 1960s, yogashi had become the dominant confection in Japan.

== Definition ==
Yogashi (洋菓子, yōgashi) refers to Western-style confectionery in Japan. According to historian Eric Rath, the term first appeared in the 1870s to label recipes that were inspired by American and Western confection; during this period, wagashi (和菓子) was also termed. Wagashi excludes non-Japanese ingredients, such as butter, milk, and eggs, while yogashi incorporates them, including wheat flour and fat. Yogashi can be divided into three categories: pâtisserie, confiserie, and glacerie.

== History ==
Western-style confectionery was introduced in Japan in the 16th century, then known as nanbangashi. Sweets such as castella, konpeitō, and karumeyaki originally come from Europe. Beginning in the late 19th century, yogashi were fused with machine production, particularly biscuits. They were produced en masse in factories. However, this is disputed by the Heibonsha World Encyclopedia, which states that they are handmade and that biscuits and candies cannot be classified as Western-style confectionery. In comparison with wagashi or dagashi makers, yogashi makers worked in better conditions, with professor Tatsuya Mitsuda writing that they were particularly known for their cleanliness. He also wrote that wagashi was seen as unhygienic due to potential spread of germs and food poisoning. The confectionery company Fūgetsudō was the leading producer of yogashi up until 1913, when it was taken over by Morinaga. During this period, yogashi became more available to the public, with advertisements becoming more prominent than those of wagashi. In 1916, Tokyo Confectionery (Meiji) was established, which soon became Morinaga's rival. They often marketed their chocolate products, depicting people, such as businessmen, women on vacations, and tennis players, doing non-domestic activities.

In the early 20th century, there were discussions about modifying the contents of confections, such as wagashi; one food education journal called for replacing koshian with tsubuan (whole red beans boiled with sugar), saying that the latter is better nutritionally, while others have tried replacing it with milk or jam. The public ended up choosing yogashi instead, due to being better for digestion. Physician Kumpei Takeuchi was skeptical regarding the preference for yogashi over wagashi, writing that chocolate would deprive young children of sleep, recommending parents to not give children chocolate until they turn four years old. However, the government, with the help of some physicians, held the opinion that yogashi was better than wagashi.

In comparison with wagashi, yogashi was deemed to be "modern, advanced, sophisticated, and sublime". However, by 1938, it held only 34% of the market share, while wagashi held 66%. (Note: By 1955, the market share of yogashi rose to 44%.) By the 1960s, yogashi had become the dominant confection in Japan, with its market share accounting for 53%.

== Sources ==
- Andoh, Elizabeth (2005). Washoku: Recipes from the Japanese Home Kitchen. Berkeley, California: Ten Speed Press. ISBN 978-0-307-81355-8.
- Banerjee-Dube, Ishita, ed. (2016). Cooking Cultures: Convergent Histories of Food and Feeling. Delhi, India & New York, London: Cambridge University Press. ISBN 978-1-107-14036-3.
  - Holtzman, Jon D. "Sweetness, Gender, and Identity in Japanese Culinary Culture". In Banerjee-Dube (2016), pp. 122–136.
- Goldstein, Darra, ed. (2015). The Oxford Companion to Sugar and Sweets. Oxford, Oxfordshire & New York, London: Oxford University Press. ISBN 978-0-19-931339-6.
- Ishige, Naomichi (2001). The History and Culture of Japanese Food. London & New York, London: Kegan Paul. ISBN 978-0-7103-0657-9.
- Jacob, Jeanne (2022). Food Cultures of Japan: Recipes, Customs, and Issues. The Global Kitchen. Santa Barbara, California: Greenwood, an imprint of ABC-CLIO. ISBN 978-1-4408-6683-8.
- Mitsuda, Tatsuya (2014). "From Reception to Acceptance: Chocolate in Japan, c. 1870–1935". Food and History. 12 (1): 175–200. doi:10.1484/j.food.5.105148.
- Mitsuda, Tatsuya (2020). "7. Snacking, Health, Modernity: Moralizing Confections in Japan, 1890–1930". Moral Foods. University of Hawaii Press. pp. 150–172. doi:10.1515/9780824879570-009. ISBN 978-0-8248-7957-0.
- Niehaus, Andreas; Walravens, Tine, eds. (2017). Feeding Japan: The Cultural and Political Issues of Dependency and Risk. Basingstoke, Hampshire: Palgrave Macmillan. ISBN 978-3-319-50552-7.
  - Walravens, Tine; Niehaus, Andreas. "Introduction: Reconsidering Japanese Food". In Niehaus & Walravens (2017), pp. 1–16.
  - Mitsuda, Tatsuya. "Sweets Reimagined: The Construction of Confectionary Identities, 1890–1930". In Niehaus & Walravens (2017), pp. 53–82.
