= Monaka =

Japanese confection

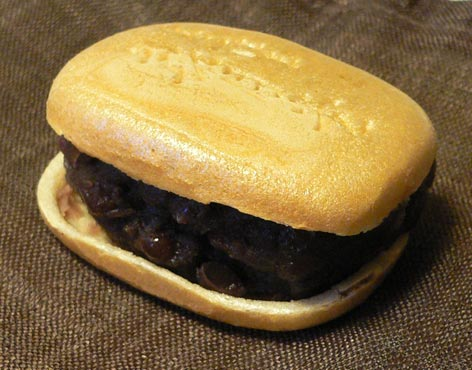
- Type: Wagashi
- Place of origin: Japan
- Main ingredients: Mochi, azuki bean paste

Monaka (最中) is a Japanese sweet made of azuki bean paste sandwiched between two thin crisp wafers made from mochi. The wafers can have the shape of a square, a triangle, or may be shaped like cherry blossoms, chrysanthemums, local landmarks, daruma, or other good luck symbols.

Monaka is a type of dessert—wagashi—which is served with tea. There are still many very famous monaka specialty stores in Japan. The azuki bean paste filling in monaka can contain sesame seeds, chestnuts, or rice cake (mochi).

During the Meiji era, wagashi came under scrutiny for their sugar content, perceived lack of nutrients compared to the animal-derived western confections, and the hygiene standards of production. Monaka was not exempt from such moral criticism, and at least one manufacturer in the early 20th century sold eisei monaka ('hygienic monaka'), advertising "no heartburn however much you eat".

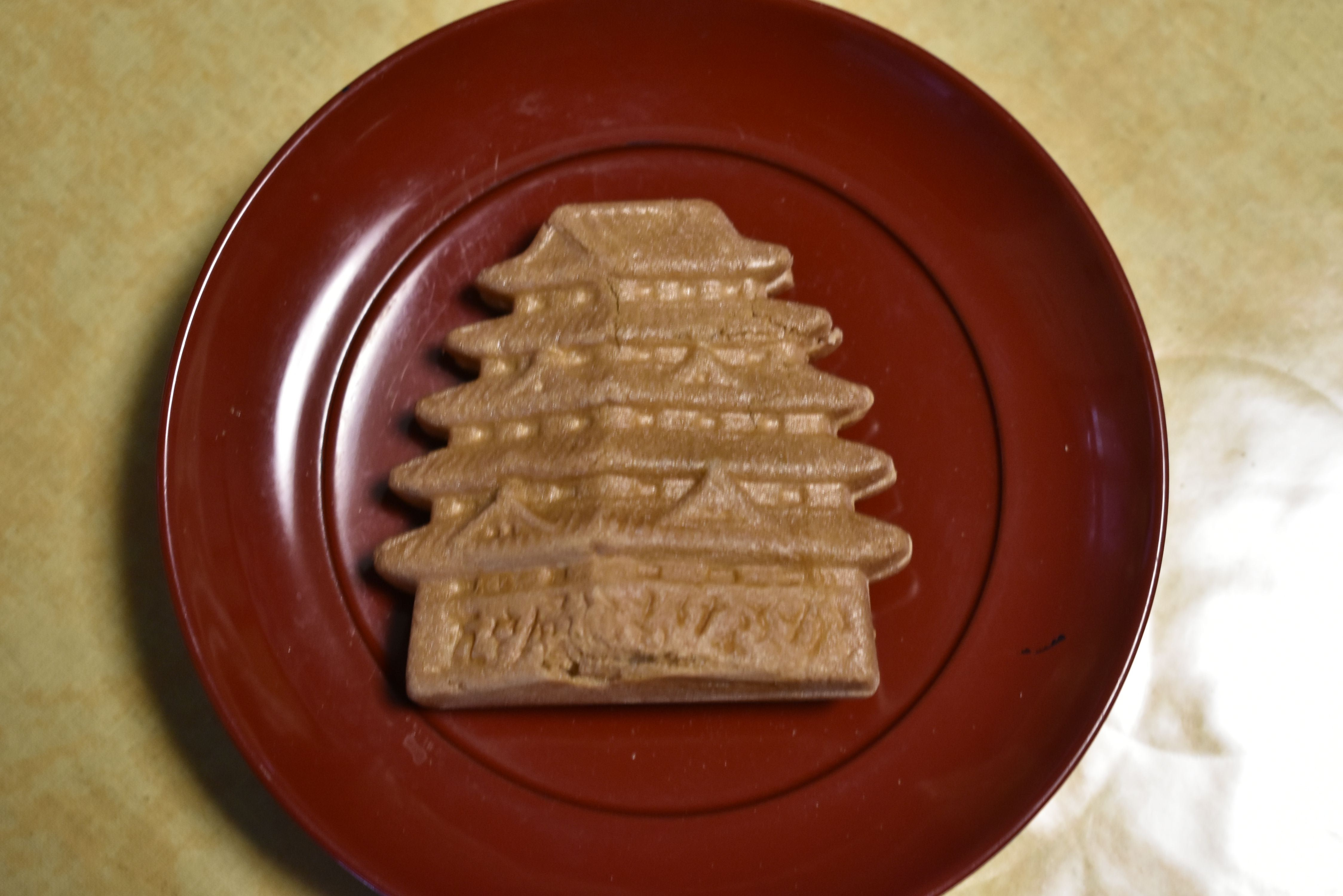
Five-layered monaka depicting Himeji Castle (Himeji City, Hyogo Prefecture, photographed in April 2022)

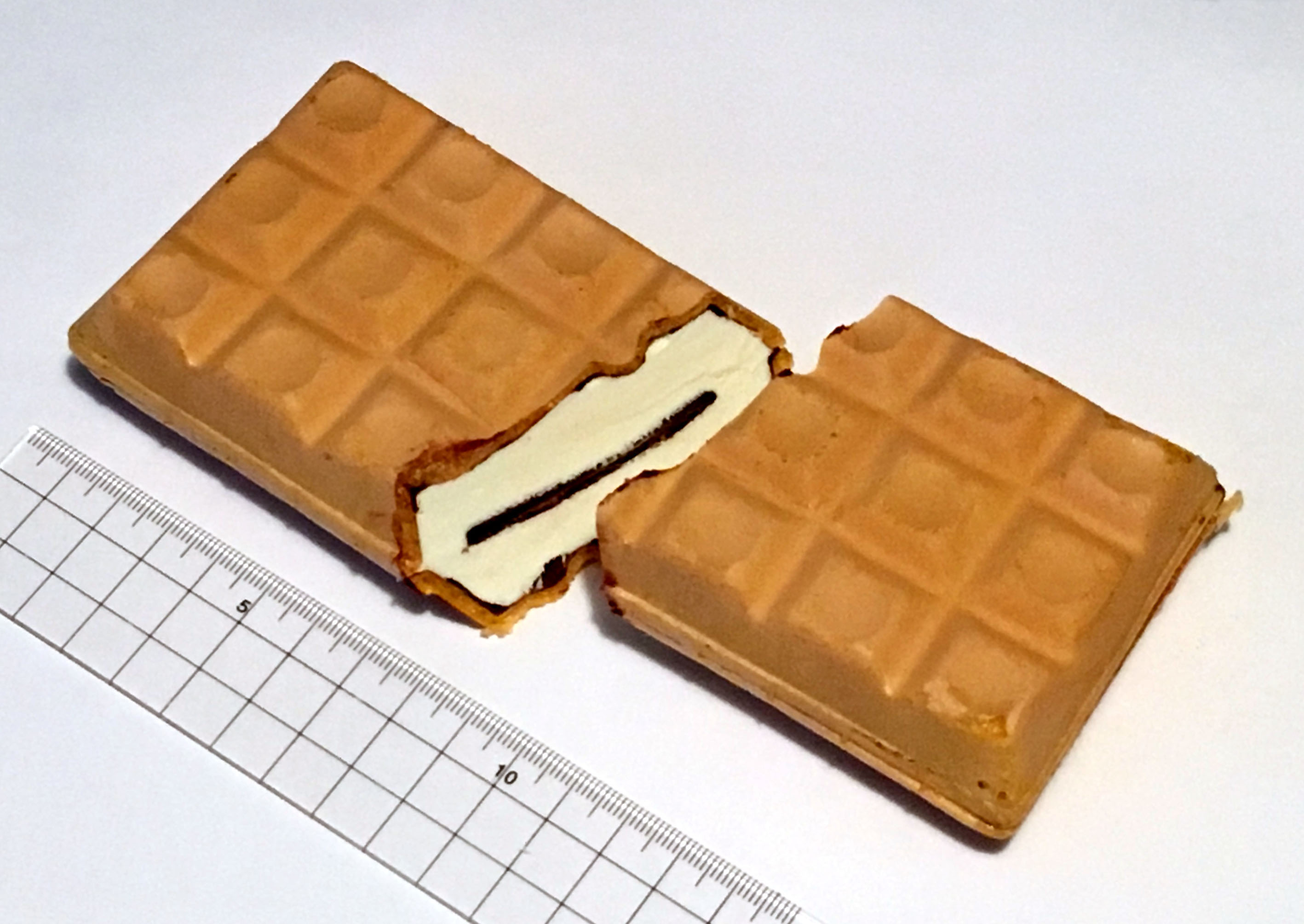
Choco Monaka Jumbo

Modern monaka can have an ice cream filling instead of azuki bean paste. Choco Monaka Jumbo is an ice cream dessert made with an ice cream and chocolate filling inside crispy mochi wafers. It was created in 1972 and is produced by Morinaga.
