= Elixir of life =

Alchemical potion that grants immunity, eternal youth and immortality to its drinker

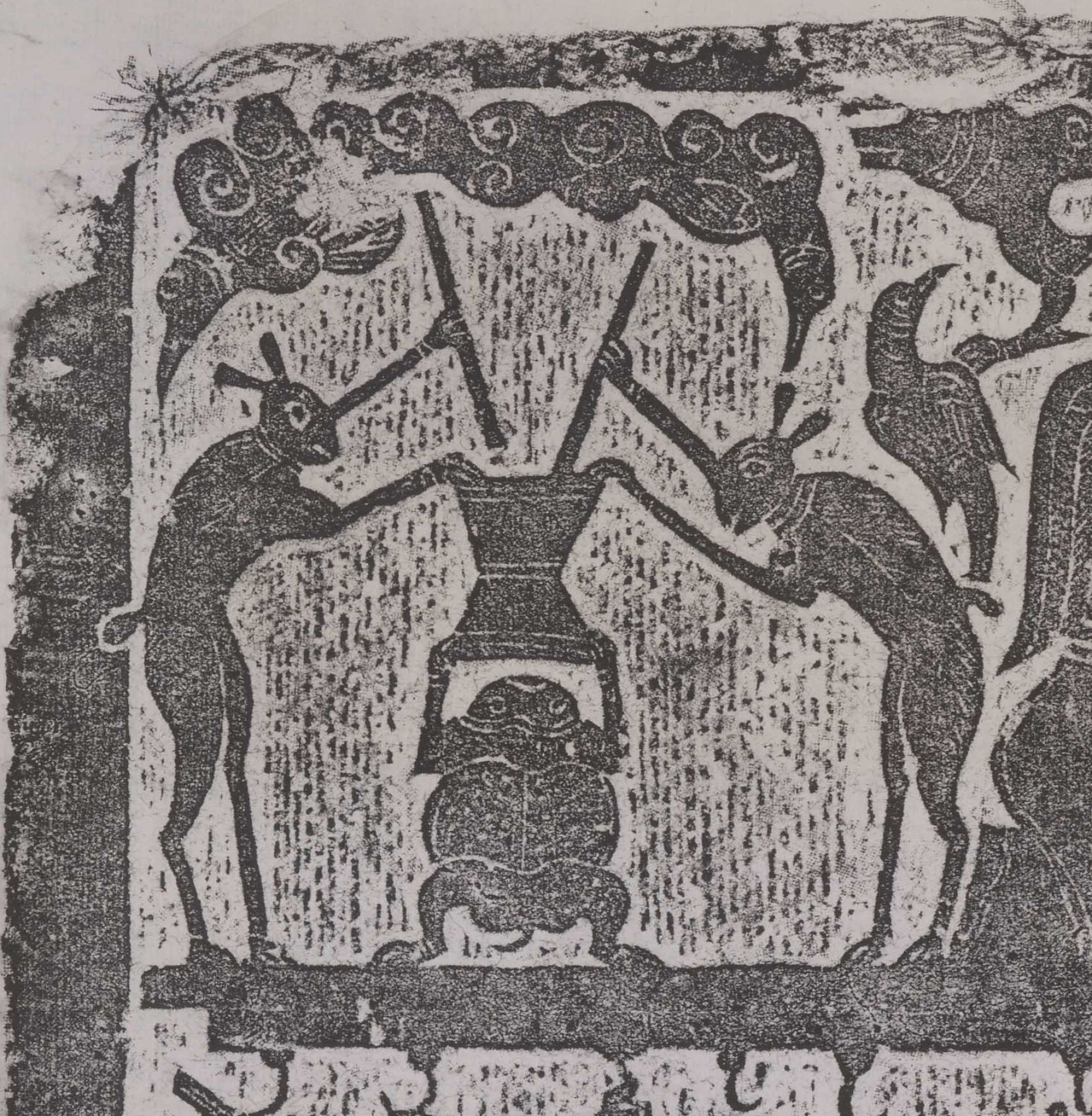
The mythological White Hare from Chinese mythology, brewing the elixir of life on the Moon

The elixir of life (Medieval Latin: elixir vitae), also known as elixir of immortality, is a potion that supposedly grants the drinker eternal life and/or eternal youth. This elixir was also said to cure all diseases. Alchemists in various ages and cultures sought the means of formulating the elixir.

== History ==
=== Ancient Mesopotamia ===
An early mention of an elixir of life is found in the Epic of Gilgamesh (from the 2nd millennium BC) in which Gilgamesh comes to fear his own declining years following the death of his beloved companion Enkidu. He seeks out Utnapishtim, a figure in Mesopotamian mythology known for surviving a great flood sent by the gods and being granted immortality. Gilgamesh is directed by Utnapishtim to find a plant at the bottom of the sea, but he loses it to a serpent before he can use it himself. This legend is an archaic explanation for snakes shedding their skin, seen as mystical rejuvenation.

=== China ===
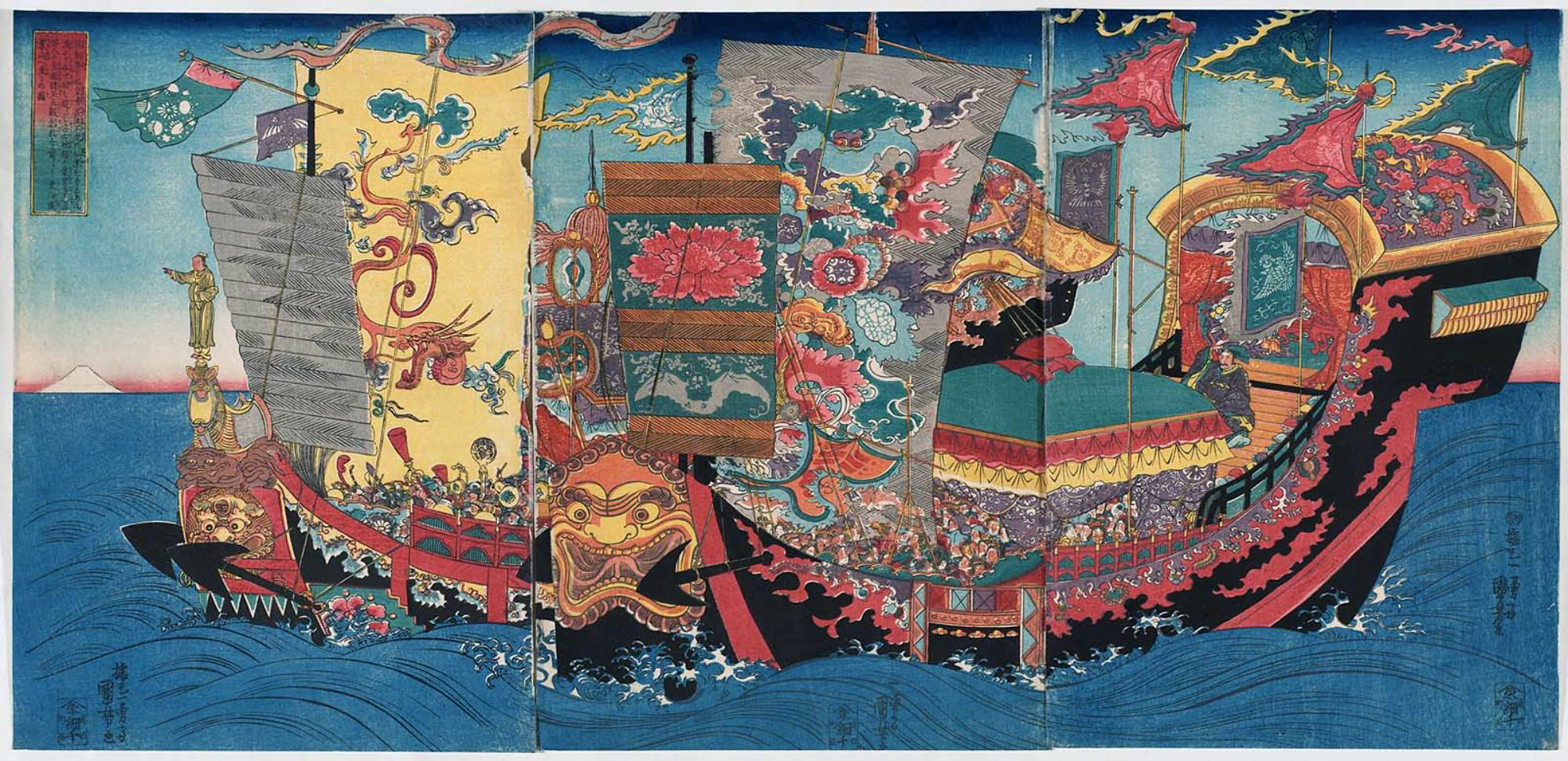
Xu Fu's first expedition to the Mount of the immortals. By Utagawa Kuniyoshi.

Many rulers of ancient China sought the fabled elixir to achieve eternal life. During the Qin dynasty, Qin Shi Huang sent Taoist alchemist Xu Fu to the eastern seas with 500 young men and 500 young women to find the elixir in the legendary Penglai Mountain, but returned without finding it. He embarked on a second voyage with 3000 young girls and boys, but none of them ever returned (legend has it that he found Japan instead).

The ancient Chinese believed that ingesting long-lasting mineral substances such as jade, cinnabar, or hematite would confer some of that longevity on the person who consumed them. Gold was considered particularly potent, as it was a non-tarnishing precious metal; the idea of potable or drinkable gold is found in China by the end of the third century BC. The most famous Chinese alchemical book, Danjing yaojue ("Essential Formulas of Alchemical Classics") attributed to Sun Simiao (c. 581 – c. 682 AD), a famous medical specialist respectfully called "King of Medicine" by later generations, discusses in detail the creation of elixirs for immortality (including several toxic ingredients such as mercury, sulphur, and arsenates), as well as those for curing certain diseases and the fabrication of precious stones.

Many of these substances, far from contributing to longevity, were actively toxic and resulted in Chinese alchemical elixir poisoning. The Jiajing Emperor in the Ming dynasty died from ingesting a lethal dosage of mercury in the supposed "Elixir of Life" conjured by alchemists.

=== India ===
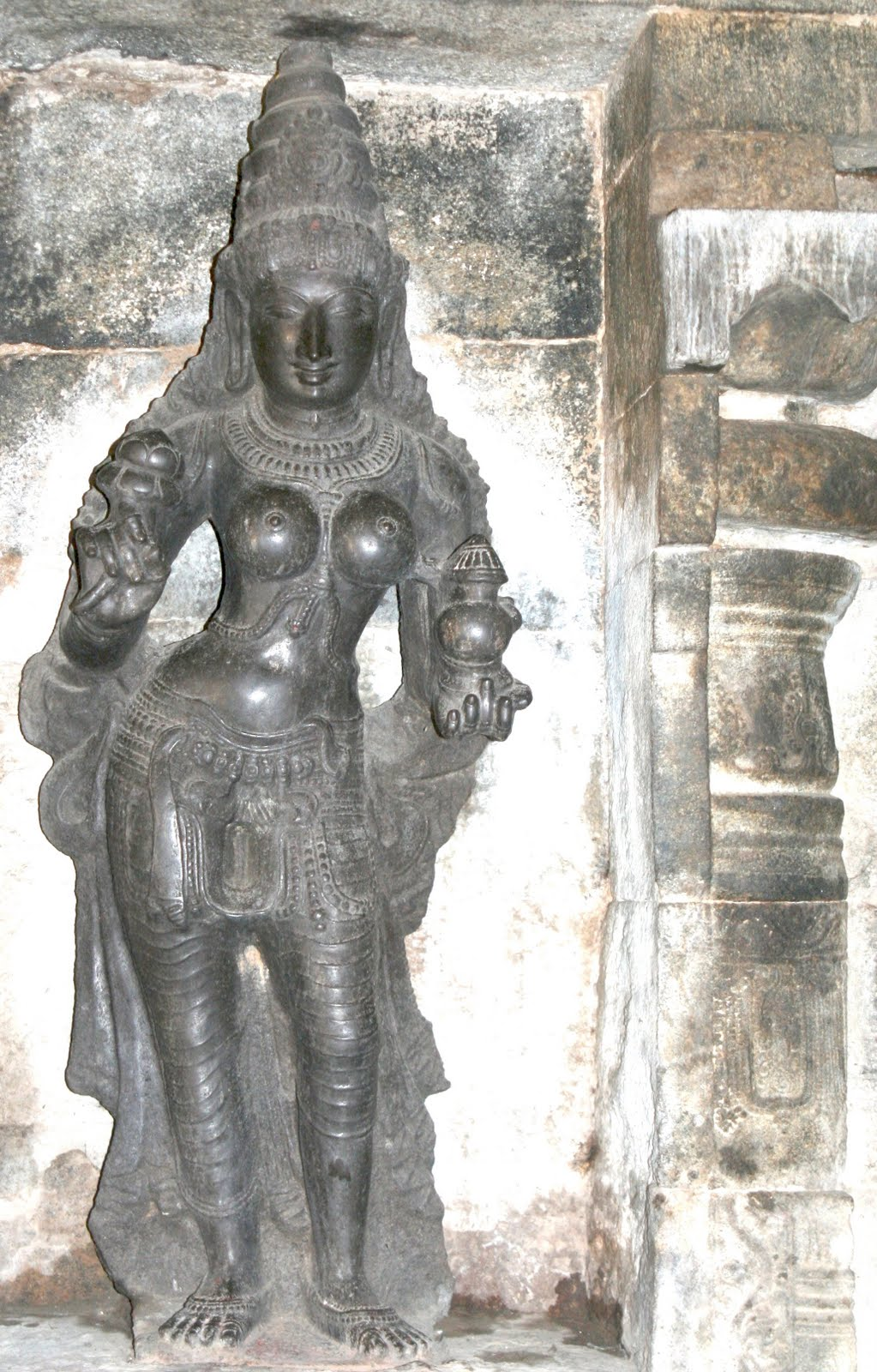
Mohini, the female form of Vishnu, holding the pot of amrita, which she distributes amongst all the devas, leaving the asuras without it. Darasuram, Tamil Nadu, India

Amrita, the elixir of life, has been described in Hindu scriptures. In the Puranas, that due to the defeat of the devas at the hands of the asuras, both power-seeking races, the preserver deity Vishnu asked the devas to churn the ocean of milk, so that they may retrieve amrita to empower themselves.

Mercury, which was so vital to alchemy everywhere, is first mentioned in the 4th- to 3rd-century BC Arthashastra, about the same time it is encountered in China and in the West. Evidence of the idea of transmuting base metals to gold appears in 2nd- to 5th-century AD Buddhist texts, about the same time as in the West.

It is also possible that the alchemy of medicine and immortality came to China from India, or vice versa; in any case, for both cultures, gold-making appears to have been a minor concern, and medicine the major concern. But the elixir of immortality was of little importance in India (which had other avenues to immortality). The Indian elixirs were mineral remedies for specific diseases or, at the most, to promote long life.

=== Europe ===
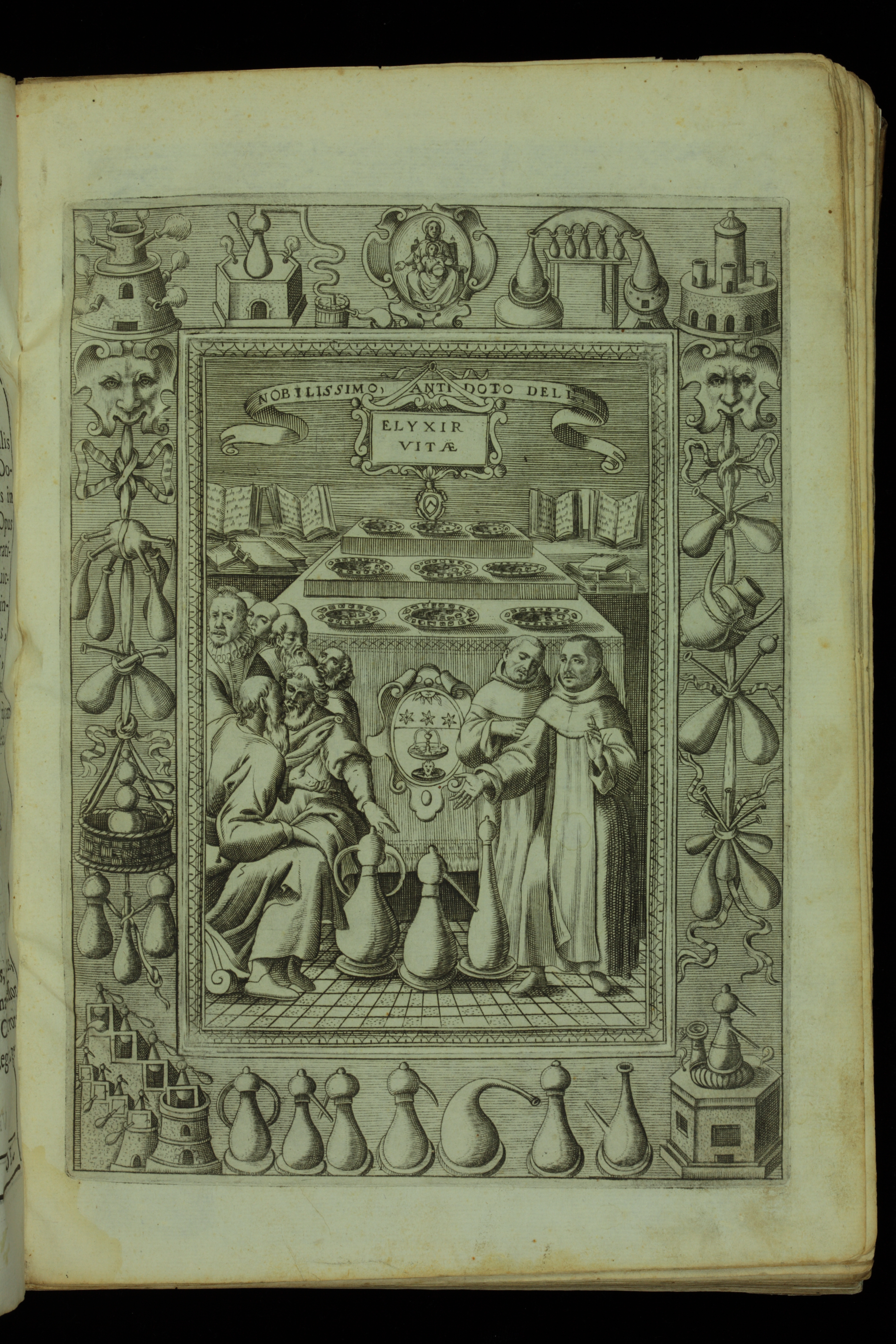
Dell' elixir vitae, 1624

In European alchemical tradition, the elixir of life is closely related to the creation of the philosopher's stone. According to legend, certain alchemists have gained a reputation as creators of the elixir. These include Nicolas Flamel and St. Germain. A work by Michael Scot speaks of gold as an elixir of life.

=== Japan ===
In the Nara period (8th century) Man'yōshū, 'waters of rejuvenation' (変若水, wotimidu) are said to be in the possession of the lunar deity Tsukuyomi-no-Mikoto. These are also mentioned in the influential Heian period narrative The Tale of the Bamboo Cutter, which describes them as originating in the moon. Similarities have been noted with a folktale from the Ryukyu Islands, in which the moon god decides to give humanity the water of life (Miyako: 変若水, romanized: sïlimizï), and serpents the water of death (死水, sïnimizï)). However, the person entrusted with carrying the pails down to Earth gets tired and takes a break, and a serpent bathes in the water of life, rendering it unusable. This is said to be why serpents can rejuvenate themselves each year by shedding their skin, while humans are doomed to die.

== Names ==
The Elixir has had hundreds of names (one scholar of Chinese history reportedly found over 1,000 names for it), among them Kimia, Amrit Ras or Amrita, Aab-i-Hayat, Maha Ras, Aab-Haiwan, Dancing Water, Chasma-i-Kausar, Mansarover or the Pool of Nectar, Philosopher's stone, and Soma Ras. The word elixir was not used until the 7th century A.D. and derives from the Arabic name for miracle substances, "al iksir". Some view it as a metaphor for the spirit of God (e.g., Jesus's reference to "the Water of Life" or "the Fountain of Life"). "But whoever drinks the water I give him will never thirst. Indeed, the water I give him will become in him a spring of water welling up to eternal life." (John 4:14) The Scots and the Irish adopted the name for their "liquid gold": the Gaelic name for whiskey is uisce beatha, or water of life.

“Kimia” is from Ancient Greek language and used in old Persian literature, in which it means something that transforms and brings life. Aab-i-Hayat is Persian and means "water of life". "Chashma-i-Kausar" (not "hasma") is the "Fountain of Bounty", which Muslims believe to be located in Paradise. As for the Indian names, "Amrit Ras" means "immortality juice", "Maha Ras" means "great juice", and "Soma Ras" means "juice of Soma". Later, Soma came to mean the Moon. "Ras" later came to mean "sacred mood experienced listening to poetry or music"; there are altogether nine of them. Mansarovar, the "mind lake" is the holy lake at the foot of Mount Kailash in Tibet, close to the source of the Ganges.

== In popular culture ==
The elixir of life has been an inspiration, plot feature, or subject of artistic works including animation, comics, films, musical compositions, novels, and video games. Some examples are L. Frank Baum's fantasy novel John Dough and the Cherub, the science fiction series Doctor Who, Natalie Babbitt's 1975 novel Tuck Everlasting and its film adaptation, Harry Potter and the Philosopher's Stone, House of Anubis, The Puppet Master, the manga Fullmetal Alchemist and Hell's Paradise: Jigokuraku, the light novel Baccano!, the movie Professor Layton and the Eternal Diva of the Professor Layton franchise, the horror film As Above, So Below and the video games Rusty Lake, Touhou Project and Sims 2.

== See also ==
- Aether (mythology)
- Aether (classical element)
- Ageing
- Al Khidr
- Ambrosia and Nectar
- Amrita
- Cup of Jamshid
- Death Becomes Her
- Elixir
- Fountain of Youth
- Golden apple
- Holy Grail
- Holy water
- Ichor
- Immortality
- Jintan (Japanese medicine)
- Magu (deity)
- Manna
- Panacea
- Peaches of Immortality
- Philosopher's stone
  - Langgan
- Pill of Immortality
  - Chinese alchemical elixir poisoning
  - Waidan
- Potion
- Rejuvenation

== Bibliography ==
- Heart of the Earth: The Elixir of Earth, second novel in the trilogy by Richard Anderson no
- Al-Khidr, The Green Man
- Alchemy and Daoism
- Naam or Word, Book Three: Amrit, Nectar or Water of Life
- Needham, Joseph, Ping-Yu Ho, Gwei-Djen Lu. Science and Civilisation in China, Volume V, Part III. Cambridge at the University Press, 1976.
- Turner, John D. (transl.). The Interpretation of Knowledge
