= Wagashi =

Traditional Japanese confectionery

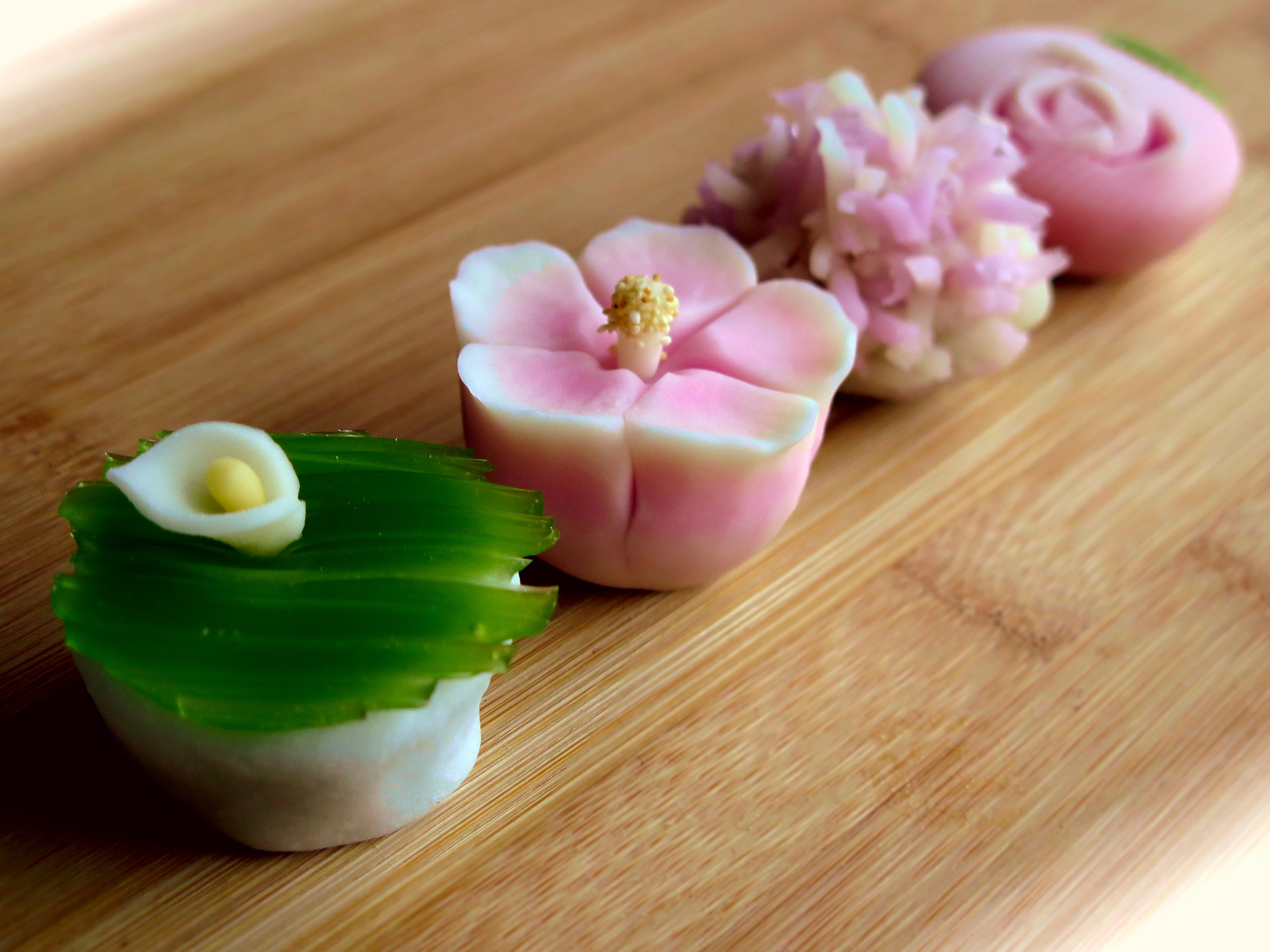
- Nerikiri (練り切り) in various shapes and colors: Asian skunk cabbage, Hibiscus syriacus, hortensia, and rose
- Type: Confectionery
- Place of origin: Japan

Wagashi (和菓子, wa-gashi) is traditional Japanese confectionery, typically made using plant-based ingredients and with an emphasis on seasonality. Wagashi generally makes use of cooking methods that pre-date Western influence in Japan. It is often served with green tea.

Most of today's wagashi was born during the Edo period (1603–1868). This was a period of peace, economic and cultural prosperity, and increased domestic self-sufficiency in sugar. During the Edo period, a type of wagashi called nerikiri (練り切り) were made by kneading white bean paste, gyūhi, sugar, yams, and other ingredients, and formed into various colors and shapes based on seasonal flowers, animals, nature, events, customs, and other themes.

== Definition ==
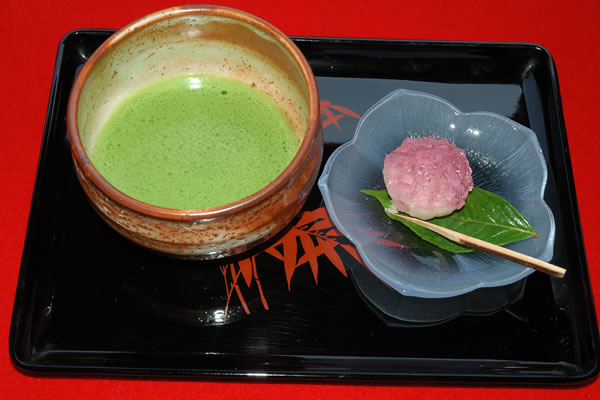
A bowl of matcha tea on a lacquered tray with wagashi

In Japan, the word for sweets or confectionery, kashi (菓子), originally referred to fruits and nuts. Fruits and nuts may be eaten as snacks between meals and served as "sweets" during a tea ceremony. The word Wa means "Japanese", and kashi becomes gashi in compound words (rendaku), wagashi therefore means "Japanese confectionery".

In 1603, the first year of the Edo period (1603–1868), the term kashi (菓子) meant both confectionery and fruit, and was more commonly used to refer to fruit. For example, the Japanese-Portuguese dictionary of the time describes "quaxi" (菓子) as "fruit, especially fruit eaten after a meal." The term mizugashi (水菓子, water confections), which is used to refer to fruit today, is a remnant of the same term.

The word wagashi was coined at the end of 1800s to distinguish Japanese confectionery from sweets, cakes and baked goods introduced from the West termed yōgashi (洋菓子). However, wagashi was not the common term for Japanese confectionery until after the Second World War.

The definition of wagashi is ambiguous, and the line between wagashi and other types of Japanese confectionery is vague. For example, although the original kasutera (castella) was introduced from Portugal, it has been around for more than 400 years and has been modified to suit Japanese tastes, so it is classified as a wagashi. Mizu shingen mochi (水信玄餅, Raindrop cake), created in 2014, was developed by a wagashi shop as a derivative of shingen mochi and is recognized as a wagashi in Japan. In recent years, wagashi shops have developed and marketed many confections that are an eclectic mix of wagashi and Western confections, often referred to as "neo-wagashi".

== History ==
=== Before the Edo period ===
==== Jomon to Nara periods ====
It is believed that the first food eaten as a confection in Japan was a processed food from the Jomon period. It is thought to have been either a food made by kneading chestnuts into a powder and then baking and hardening it with eggs and salt, or a food made by adding animal flesh to chestnut flour and baking and hardening it.

During the Yayoi period, dango (団子, dumpling) were made from grain or rice flour.

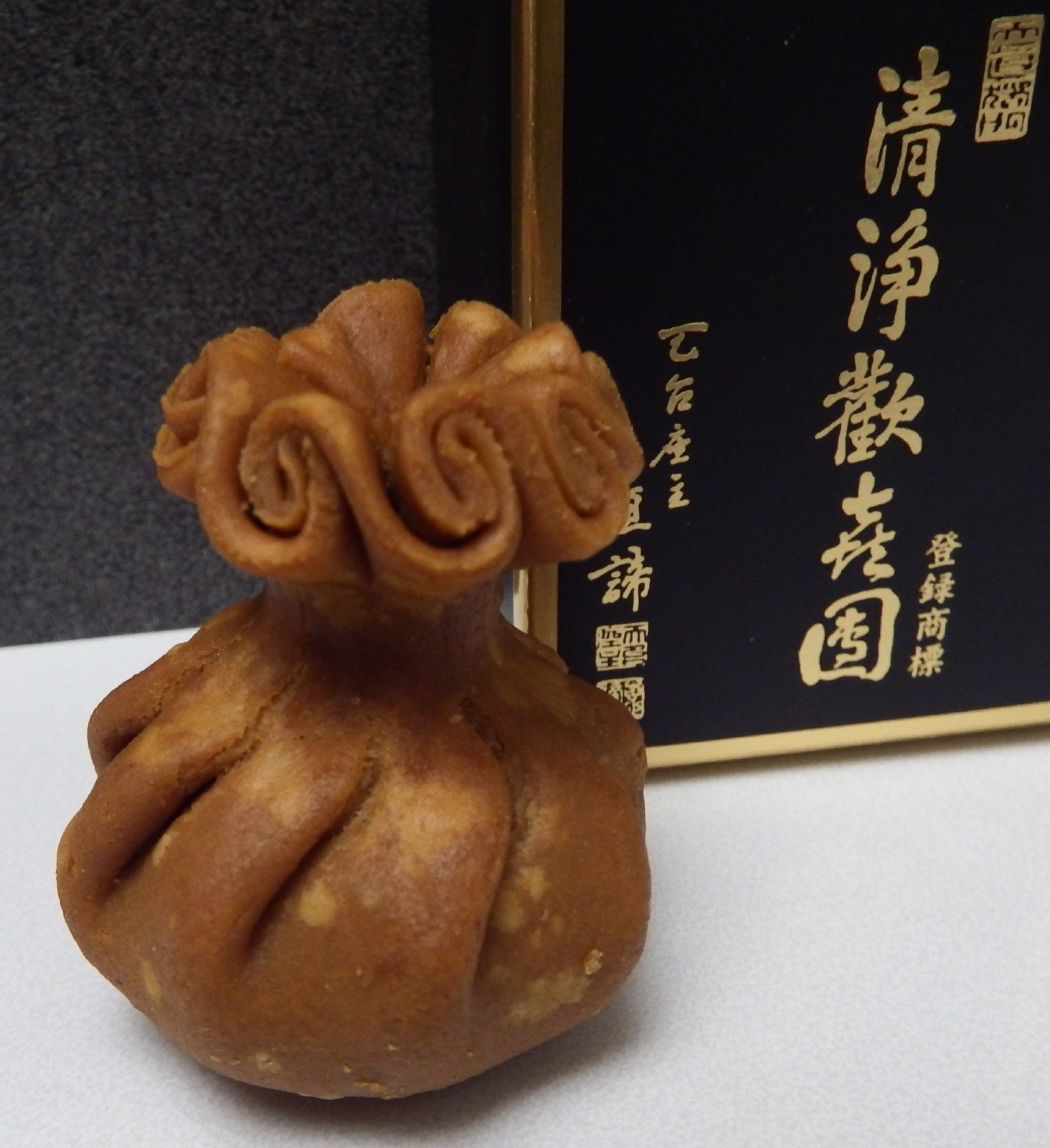
Karakudamono

During the Nara period (710–794), a food called karakudamono (唐菓子, Chinese confections) was brought to Japan from the Tang dynasty. This food consisted mostly of powdered kneaded rice, wheat, soybeans, and azuki beans, seasoned with sweet miso paste, and fried in oil as the main ingredient. It was prized as a ritual food in various forms, but later fell into disuse in Japan and is now used as an offering to the Buddha in modern Buddhism. Sugar was introduced to Japan around 750, but it was not until 850 years later, around the Edo period, that sugar-based wagashi began to be widely produced.

==== Heian to Muromachi periods ====
The first beautifully crafted confections were created in the Heian period (794–1185) and are mentioned in The Tale of Genji under the names tsubakimochi (椿餅) and aosashi (青差). Tsubakimochi was originally a confection that was not fried in oil, which was unusual among karakudamono, but it was later changed to suit the tastes of the Japanese people. In the beginning, it was a mochi made by coating rice flour with a sweetener made from the juice of boiled vine grass and wrapping it in camellia leaves. Later, the sweetener made from the juice of boiled vine grass was replaced by sugar, and the rice cake was filled with red bean paste. Confectionery of this period was food offered to the nobility.

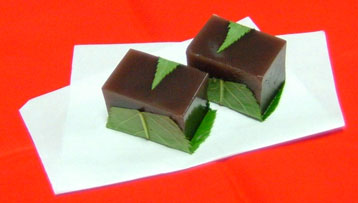
In the Kamakura period, yōkan (羊羹) was a mutton soup, and today's mainstream yōkan was born in the 1800s after the Japanese invented kanten (寒天, agar) in the 1600s. This thick Japanese jellied dessert is now made of adzuki bean paste, agar, and sugar.

During the Kamakura period (1185–1333), Japanese Buddhist monks who studied in the Song dynasty brought the tea culture to Japan, and the custom of eating confections with tea began in Japan. The monks also introduced tenshin (点心, dim sum), a light meal, and the history book Teikun ōrai (庭訓往来) mentions manjū (饅頭), yōkan (羊羹), and udon (饂飩) as tenshin (点心). However, the manjū and yōkan brought to Japan by the monks were not sweets as we know them today, but were prepared in a completely different way. At that time, manjū was not confection, did not contain red bean paste, and were not sweet. The history book Sōgo ōzōshi (宗五大草紙) clearly describes manjū as a dish eaten with chopsticks along with soup and pickles. Later, manjū changed from a light meal to a confection to suit Japanese tastes. In the Muromachi period (1336–1573), Shokunin utaai ehon (職人歌合画本) depicted sweet manjū made with sugar. This manjū is considered the prototype of today's manjū. Yōkan was a soup containing mutton, but since there was no custom of eating animal meat in Japan, the Japanese replaced the meat with a paste made of kneaded barley or azuki bean flour. Later, the soup was removed and replaced with a pasty confection made of barley or azuki bean flour. Finally, around 1800, during the Edo period (1603–1868), 500 years later, yōkan became what it is today. The invention of kanten (寒天, agar) in the 1600s was essential to the birth of modern yokan. Later, the kanten invented in Japan was introduced to Manchuria, Korea and Taiwan. The udon was also very different from today's udon, more like wonton. (餛飩).

==== Sengoku and Azuchi-Momoyama periods ====
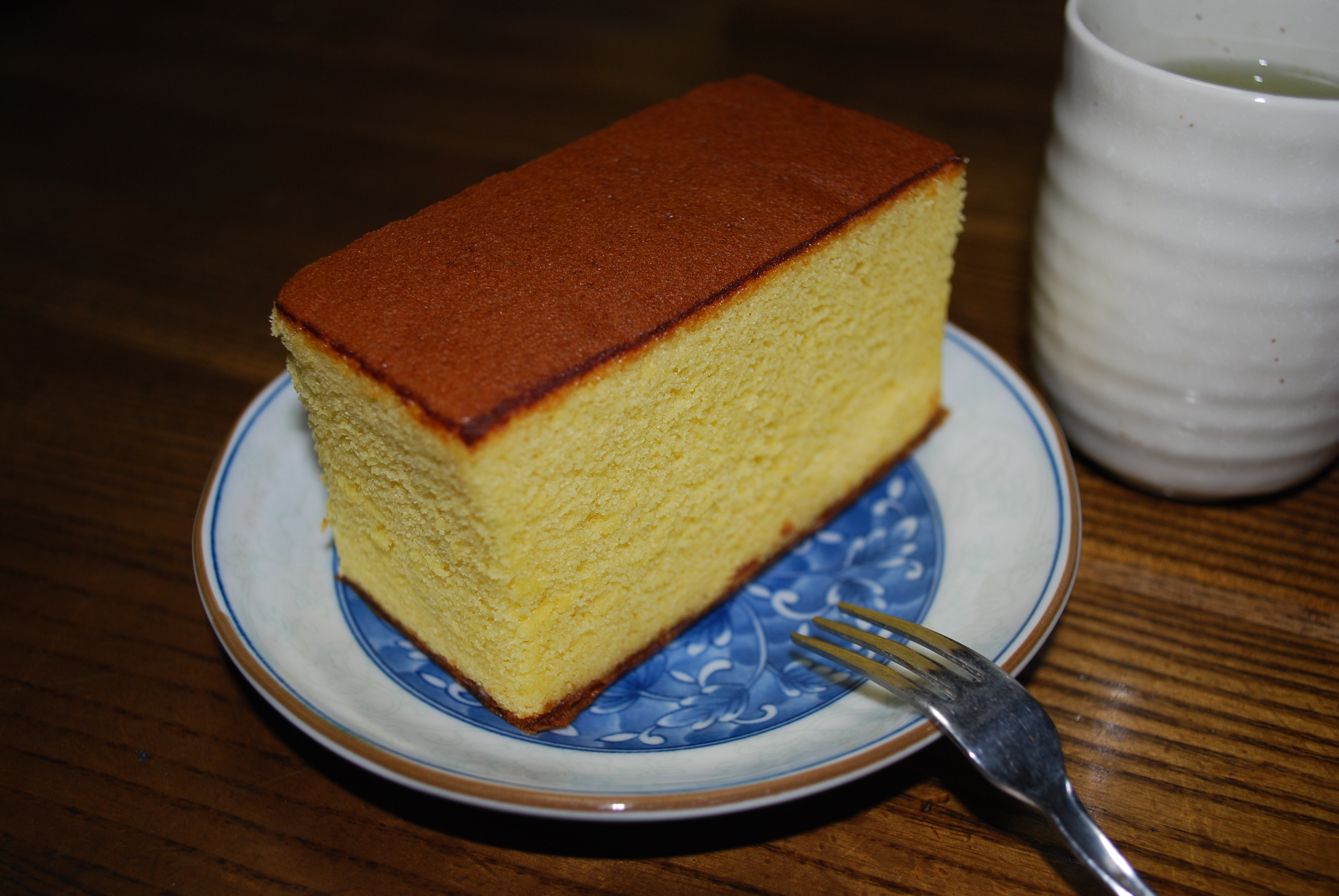
Kasutera

During the Sengoku period, the Portuguese brought Western confectionery to Japan through the Nanban trade. Kasutera (カステラ, castella) is a typical confection based on these Western confections. Kasutera was the only exception because it was made from chicken eggs, while Japanese confectionery was made from vegetable ingredients. To suit their own tastes, the Japanese added mizuame (水飴) to the sponge cake to make it more moist, and zarame (ザラメ, coarse sugar), was added to the bottom of the sponge cake to give it a coarser texture. As trade increased, so did sugar imports. The prototype of konpeitō (金平糖) was also brought to Japan through trade with Portugal and Spain. While Kompeitō, introduced from Portugal, was a sugar-coated confection with a poppy seed or sesame seed center, the Japanese eventually transformed it into an all-sugar confection with a zarame (ザラメ, coarse sugar) center.

From the Sengoku period to the Azuchi-Momoyama period, wagashi developed along with the Japanese tea ceremony, and delicate, beautiful, and aesthetically pleasing confections began to emerge. The Japanese tea ceremony was used as a secret meeting place for daimyō (大名, feudal lords) and as a salon for the upper class.

=== Emergence of modern wagashi ===
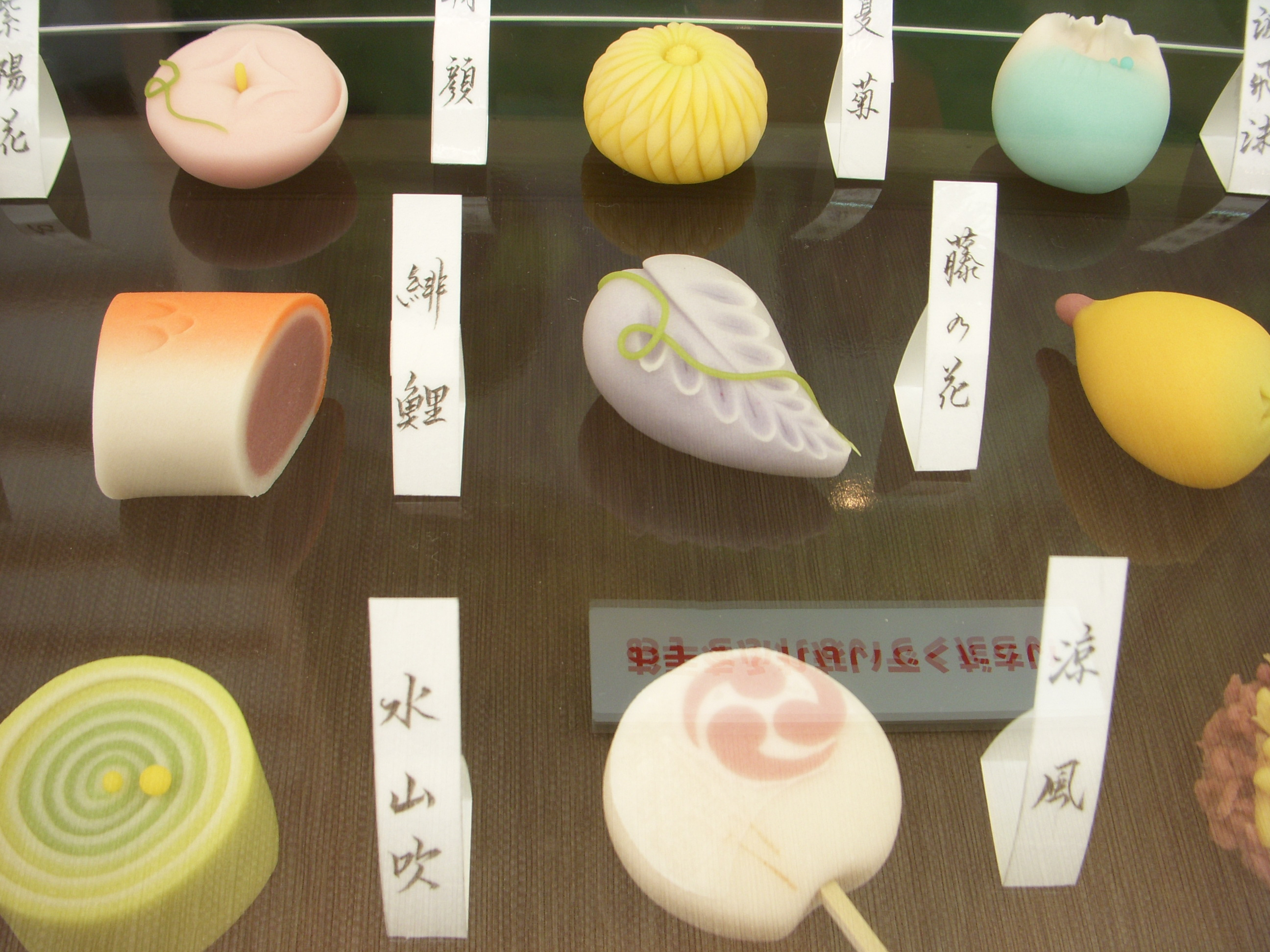
Nerikiri (練り切り) are based on various seasonal scenes. In order of nameplate from top left to bottom right: morning glory, chrysanthemum, splashing waves, scarlet salmon fillet, wisteria, Yamabuki spring water, and cool breeze.

During the Edo period, wagashi developed dramatically, establishing what we know today as wagashi. From the Keicho (1596–1615) to the Kan'ei era (1624–1644), classical Japanese literature and seasonal elegance began to be incorporated into wagashi brand names. During the Genroku era (1688–1704), when the Genroku culture flourished, wagashi with beautiful shapes and colors based on themes from classical literature and seasonal elegance began to be produced under the influence of the Rimpa school of art.

Self-sufficiency in sugar increased when Tokugawa Yoshimune, the eighth Tokugawa shogun, encouraged the production of sugar. In Sanuki Province, which is now Kagawa Prefecture, sugar called wasanbon (和三盆) was produced. The common people began to eat wagashi that used a lot of sugar, and various types of wagashi were produced, especially in Kyoto. Local wagashi specialties began to be produced in various regions of Japan, and a wagashi culture blossomed throughout the country. The design of nerikiri (練り切り), a beautiful fresh confection with various shapes and colors that characterizes wagashi, was created and developed in Kyoto during this period and spread to all parts of Japan. The brand names and designs of these uniquely Japanese wagashi were compiled and recorded in picture books. The most famous of these is Onmushigashizu (御蒸菓子図), which lists the brand names and designs of wagashi from each period of the Edo period in color illustrations.

The famous Kyoto wagashi Yatsuhashi (八ツ橋) was created in 1689 during the Genroku era (1688–1704) or in 1805 during the Bunka era (1804–1818). The name Yatsuhashi comes from a scene in the Tale of Ise or from the musician Yatsuhashi Kengyo, and is made by steaming a mixture of rice flour, sugar, and cinnamon, stretching the dough thin, and baking it. Yatsuhashi is still a popular souvenir today, and according to a survey conducted by the city of Kyoto in 2022, 89.2% of Japanese tourists visiting Kyoto bought souvenirs, of which 10.7% bought Yatsuhashi.

==== Ame and amezaiku ====
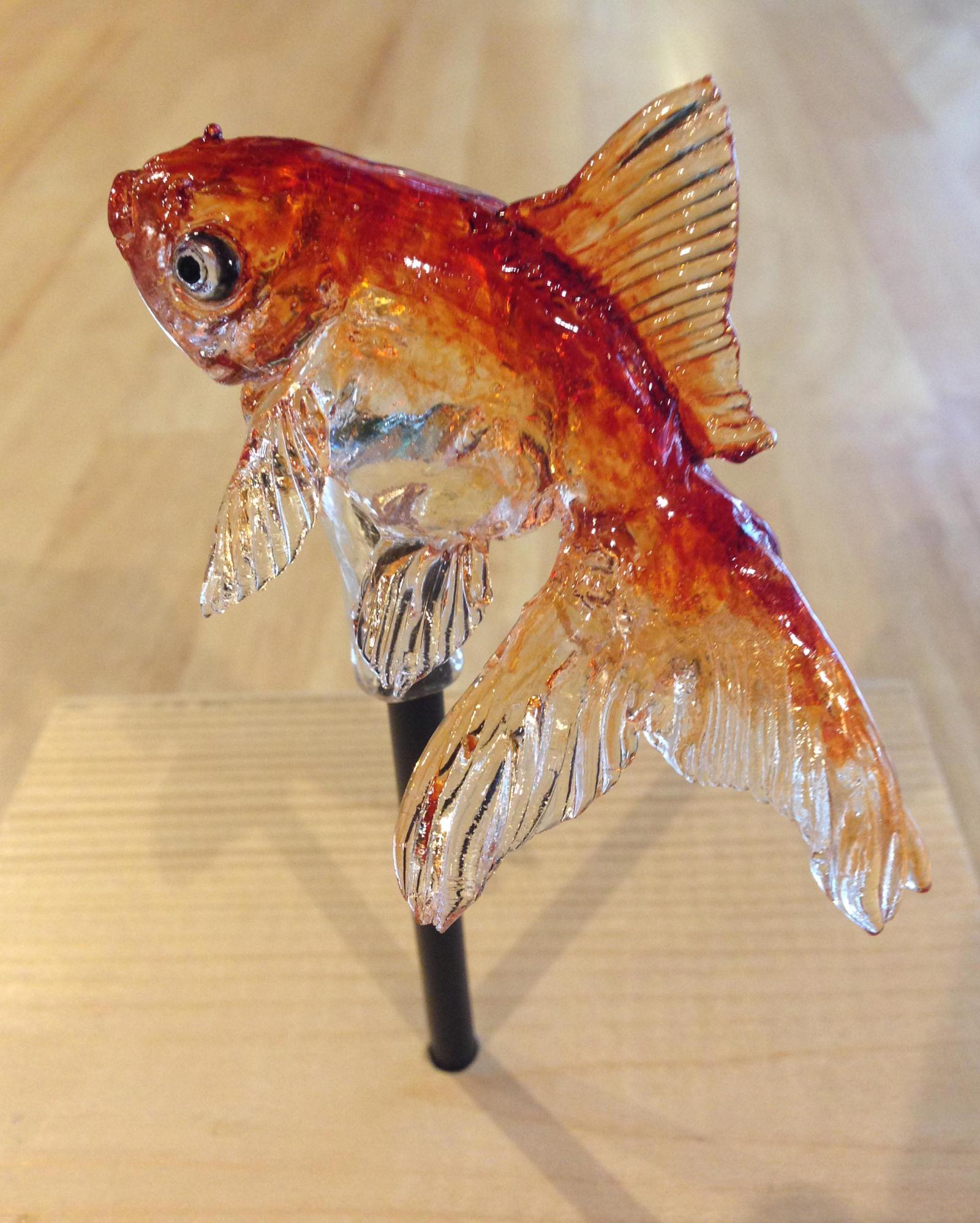
Amezaiku in the shape of a goldfish

During this time, ame (飴, candy) became popular with the common people. The ingredients of common people's sweets were often inexpensive grain-derived sweeteners rather than expensive sugar. Ame was so popular that many people came up with creative ways to sell it. Peddlers sold ame by performing various tricks while walking the streets of the city, displaying karakuri puppet (traditional Japanese mechanized puppets), and dressing up as women. In the Kan'ei era (1624–1644), peddlers began selling a variety of wagashi to the general public in addition to ame.

The production of amezaiku (飴細工, candy craft artistry), elaborate animal-shaped amezaiku, spread throughout the city beyond the previous temples along with the development of misemono (street performance). The traditional Japanese scissors were indispensable for the production of amezaiku, and when the production of iron increased dramatically with the invention of the balance bellows in tatara iron manufacturing (たたら製鉄), the production of scissors also increased, contributing to the production of amezaiku. During the Bunka (1804–1818) and Bunsei era (1818–1830), it was possible to obtain amezaiku with the same shape as today's amezaiku.

==== Japan's modernization and beyond ====
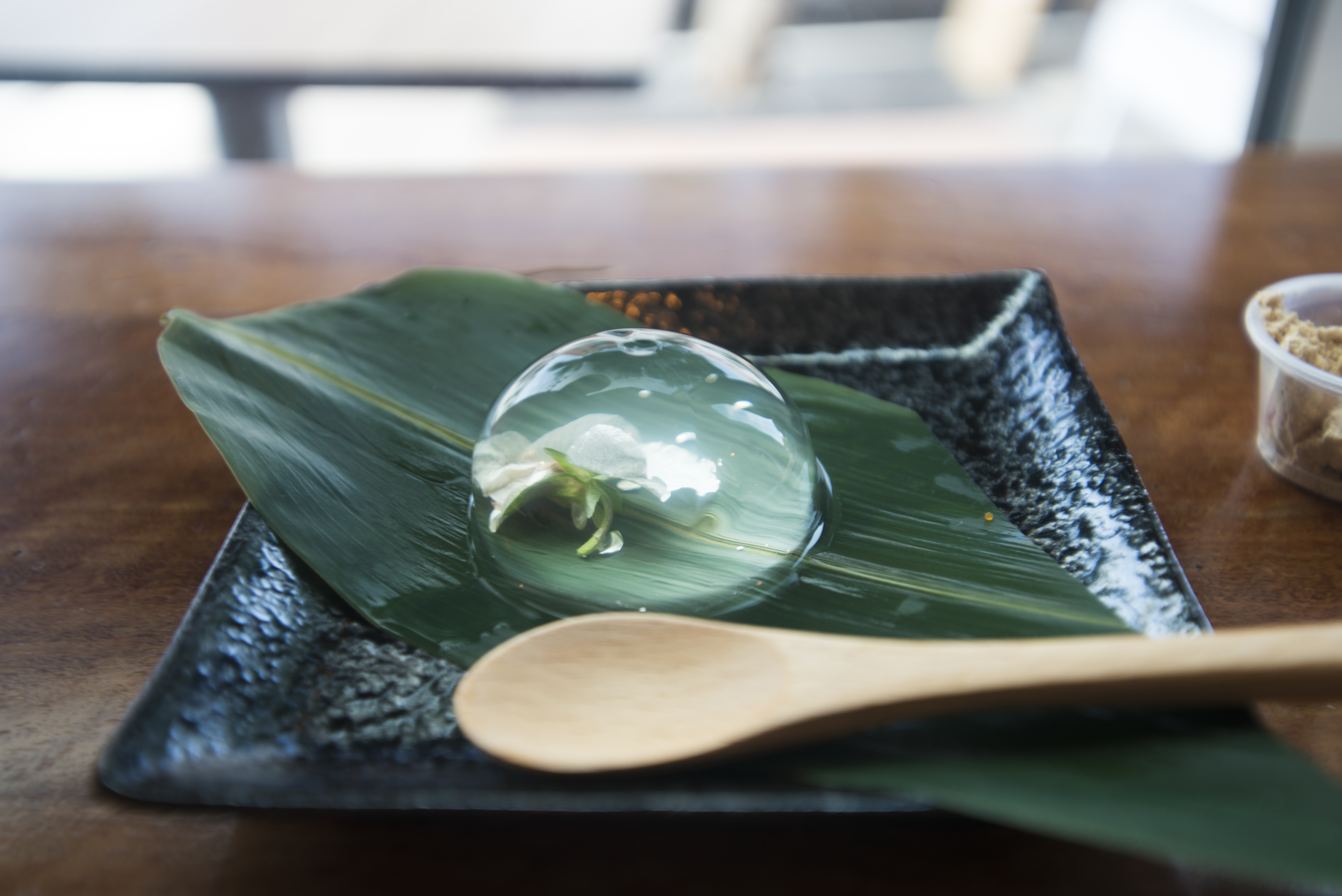
Raindrop cake (mizu shingen mochi)

During the Meiji era (1868–1912), when Japan began active trade with the West after the end of its sakoku (鎖国, isolation policy), Western cooking utensils were brought to Japan. With the advent of the modern oven, many baked confections such as kuri manjū (栗饅頭, chestnut manjū) and kasutera manjū (カステラ饅頭, castella manjū) were born.

In the 21st century, wagashi continues to be created. Nama yatsuhashi (生八ツ橋, unbaked or raw Yatsuhashi), created in 1960, is a very popular souvenir of Kyoto. According to a survey conducted by the City of Kyoto in 2022, 89.2% of Japanese tourists who visited Kyoto bought souvenirs, of which 31.6% bought Nama yatsuhashi.

In 2014, a wagashi shop in Yamanashi Prefecture created a mizu shingen mochi (水信玄餅, Raindrop cake) from kanten (agar) and water. The popularity of this wagashi has spread outside of Japan, and derivative products have been created.

== Types ==
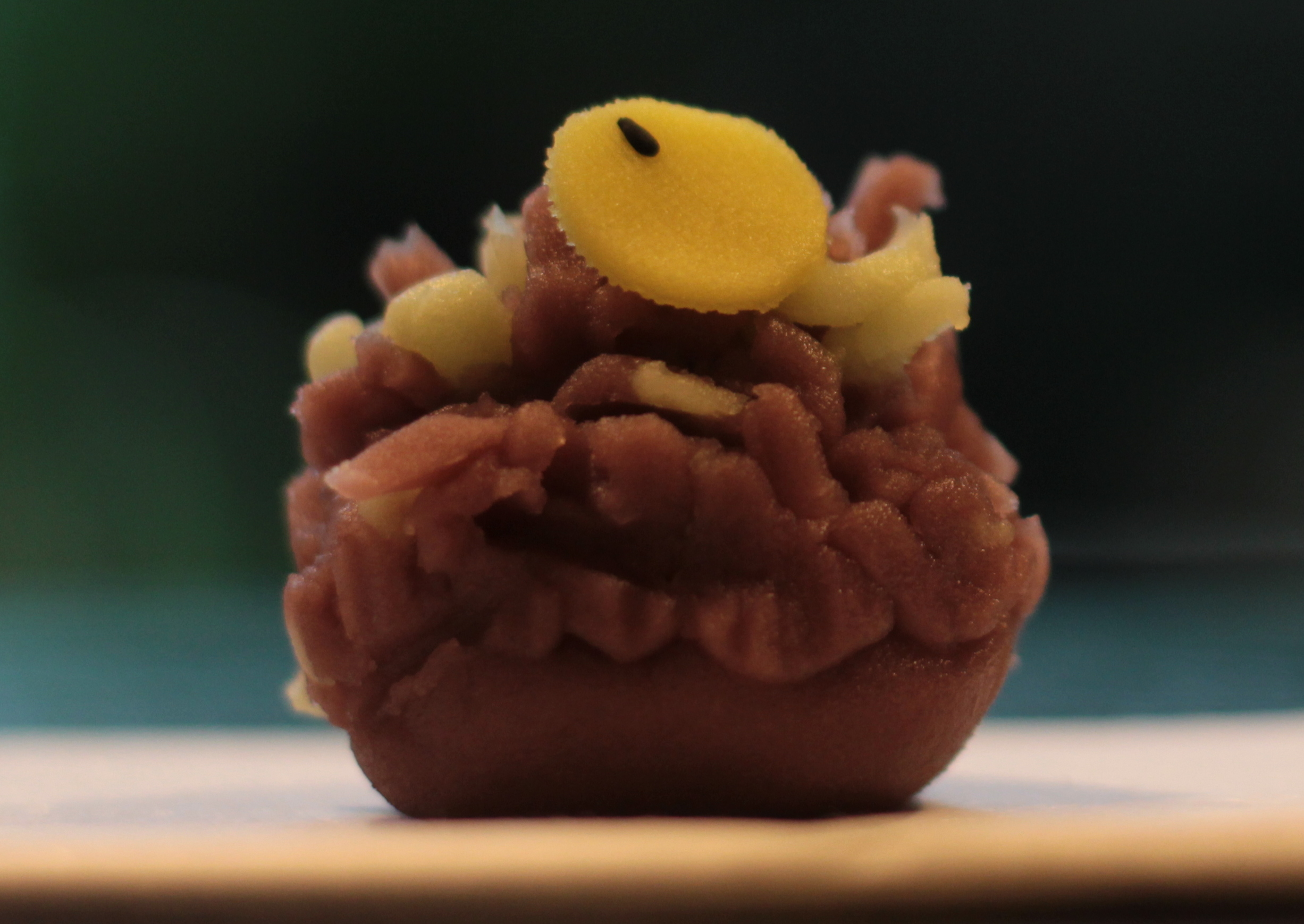
Hotaru (firefly) wagashi

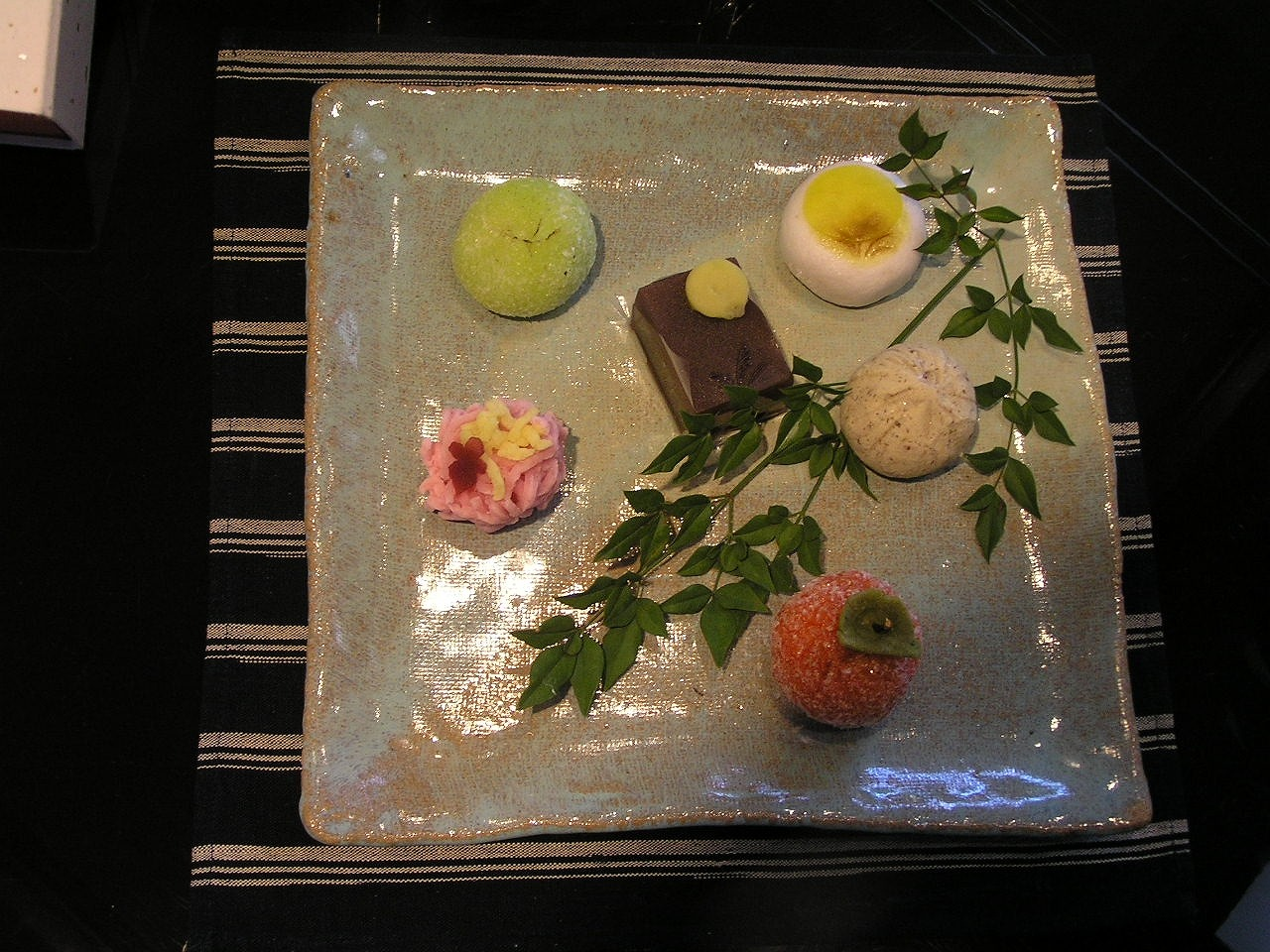
A plate of six wagashi

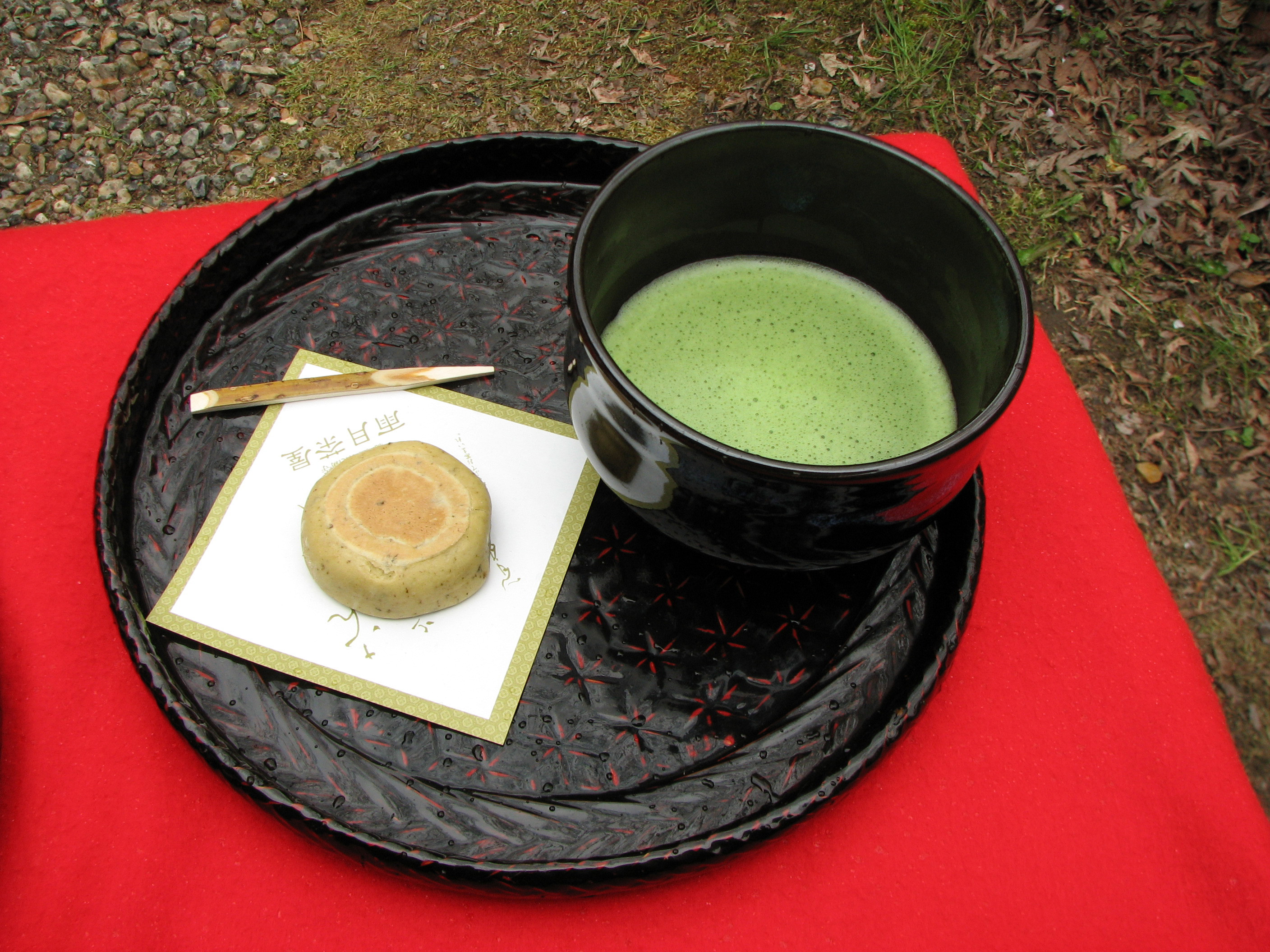
Wagashi served with matcha tea

- Akumaki: one of the confections of Kagoshima Prefecture
- Anmitsu: chilled agar jelly cubes (kanten) served with sweet red bean paste and fruit
- Amanattō: simmered azuki beans or other beans with sugar, and dried—amanattō and nattō are not related, although the names are similar.
- Botamochi: a sweet rice ball wrapped with anko (or an, thick azuki bean paste)
- Daifuku: general term for mochi (pounded sweet rice) stuffed with anko
- Dango: a small, sticky, sweet Japanese dumpling, commonly skewered on a stick
- Domyoji: wagashi made with anko (red beans) wrapped in sticky rice
- Dorayaki: a round, flat sweet consisting of castella wrapped around anko
- Gokabou: a sweetened cake made of rice and mixed with sugar
- Hanabiramochi: a flat, red and white, sweet mochi wrapped around anko and a strip of candied gobo (burdock), shaped like a flower petal
- Ikinari dango: a steamed bun with a chunk of sweet potato and anko in the center, it is a local confectionery in Kumamoto.
- Imagawayaki (also kaitenyaki): anko surrounded in a disc of fried dough covering
- Kompeito: crystal sugar candy
- Kusa mochi: "grass" mochi, a sweet mochi infused with Japanese mugwort (yomogi), surrounding a center of anko
- Kuzumochi
- Kuri kinton: a sweetened mixture of boiled and mashed chestnuts
- Manjū: steamed cakes of an surrounded by a flour mixture, available in many shapes such as peaches, rabbits, and matsutake (松茸) mushrooms
- Mochi: a rice cake made of glutinous rice
- Monaka: a center of anko sandwiched between two delicate and crispy sweet rice crackers
- Oshiruko (also zenzai): a hot dessert made from anko in a liquid, soup form, with small mochi floating in it
- Rakugan: a small, very solid and sweet cake which is made of rice flour and mizuame
- Sakuramochi: a rice cake filled with anko and wrapped in a pickled cherry leaf
- Taiyaki: like a imagawayaki, a core of anko surrounded by a fried dough covering, but shaped like a fish
- Uirō: a steamed cake made of rice flour and sugar, similar to mochi
- Warabimochi: traditionally made from warabi and served with kinako and kuromitsu
- Yatsuhashi: thin sheets of gyūhi (sweetened mochi), available in different flavors, like cinnamon, and occasionally folded in a triangle around a ball of red anko
- Yōkan: one of the oldest wagashi, a solid block of anko, hardened with agar and additional sugar
- Yubeshi
- Karukan
- Kurobo

=== Classification ===
There are several ways to classify wagashi, including classification by moisture content, ingredients, and production method. The most common classification method is based on moisture content, which is very important because it affects shelf life. According to this classification, sweets with a moisture content of 30% or more are classified as namagashi (wet confectionery), those with a moisture content of 10% to 30% are classified as han namagashi (half-wet confectionery), and those with a moisture content of less than 10% are classified as higashi (dry confectionery).

When classified by production method, each type of wagashi is classified as neri mono, which is made by kneading ingredients; mushi mono, which is made by steaming; yaki mono, which is made by baking; age mono, which is made by frying; nagashi mono, which is made by pouring ingredients into a mold; uchi mono, which is made by mixing powdered ingredients and sugar into a mold and then hardening the mixture; kake mono, which is made by pouring syrup over the ingredients; and ame mono, which is made by boiling down the sugar and hardening it, and so on.

For example, yōkan can be classified as either namagashi (wet confectionery) or han namagashi (half-wet confectionery), depending on the product, as the moisture content varies from product to product. It is also classified as nagashi mono because it is made by pouring kanten (agar) into a mold and hardening it.

- Namagashi (生菓子) (wet confectionery)—contains 30% or more moisture
  - Jō namagashi (上生菓子) is a very soft and delicate, seasonally varying namagashi, in various, often elaborate, shapes and colors, often reflecting seasonal plants. Some stores will have many dozens over the course of a year.
  - Mochi mono (もち物)
  - Mushi mono (蒸し物) (steamed confectionery)
  - Yaki mono (焼き物) (baked confectionery)
    - Hiranabe mono (平なべ物)(Flat pan baked confectionery)
    - Ōbun mono (オーブン物) (oven baked confectionery)
  - Nagashi mono (流し物)
  - Neri mono (練り物)
  - Age mono (揚げ物) (fried confectionery)
- Han namagashi (半生菓子) (half-wet confectionery)—contains 10%–30% moisture
  - An mono (あん物)
  - Oka mono (おか物)
  - Yaki mono (焼き物) (baked confectionery)
    - Hiranabe mono (平なべ物)(Flat pan baked confectionery)
    - Ōbun mono (オーブン物) (oven baked confectionery)
  - Nagashi mono (流し物)
  - Neri mono (練り物)
- Higashi (干菓子) (dry confectionery)—contains 10% or less moisture
  - Uchi mono (打ち物)
  - Oshi mono (押し物)
  - Kake mono (掛け物)
  - Yaki mono (焼き物) (baked confectionery)
  - Ame mono (あめ物) (candy confectionery)

== See also ==
- Guo Zi – Chinese confections
- Hangwa – Korean confections
- Bánh – Vietnamese sweet or savoury snacks and confections
- Turkish delight – Turkish confections
- Sugar in Japan
- List of Japanese desserts and sweets
- List of Japanese snacks
