= Uirō =

Japanese steamed cake

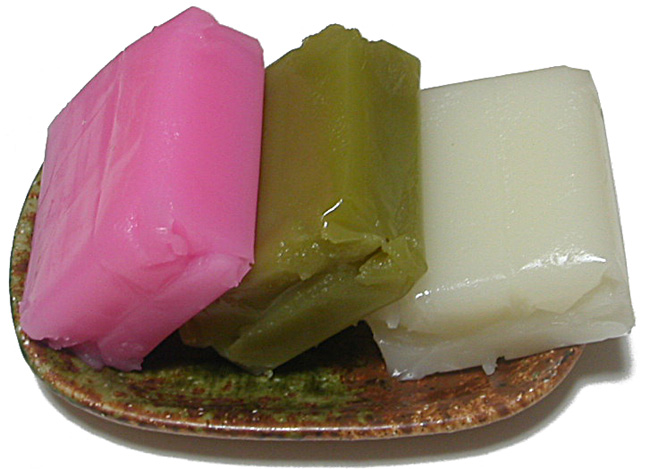
- Uirō of sakura (left), ryokucha (centre), shiro (right)
- Type: Cake
- Place of origin: Japan
- Main ingredients: Rice flour, sugar

Uirō (Japanese: 外郎, 外良, ういろう), also known as uirō-mochi (外郎餅), is a traditional Japanese steamed cake made of glutinous rice flour and sugar. It is chewy, similar to mochi, and subtly sweet. Flavors include azuki bean paste, green tea (matcha), yuzu, strawberry and chestnut. Nagoya is particularly famous for its uirō, and there are other regional versions, notably in Yamaguchi and Odawara, although Odawara's uirō is better known as a medicine. It can be purchased in traditional Japanese confectionery shops throughout Japan.

Uirō was originally the name of a medicine in the Muromachi period (1336–1573). References to uirō as a confection first appear in the Wa-Kan Sansai Zue, Ryōan Terajima's massive Edo-period dictionary published in 1712.

== See also ==
- Japanese cuisine
- List of steamed foods
- Wagashi
- Uirō (Japanese medicine)
- Put chai ko (缽仔糕 Uirō with red beans)
