= Gokabou =

Japanese wagashi

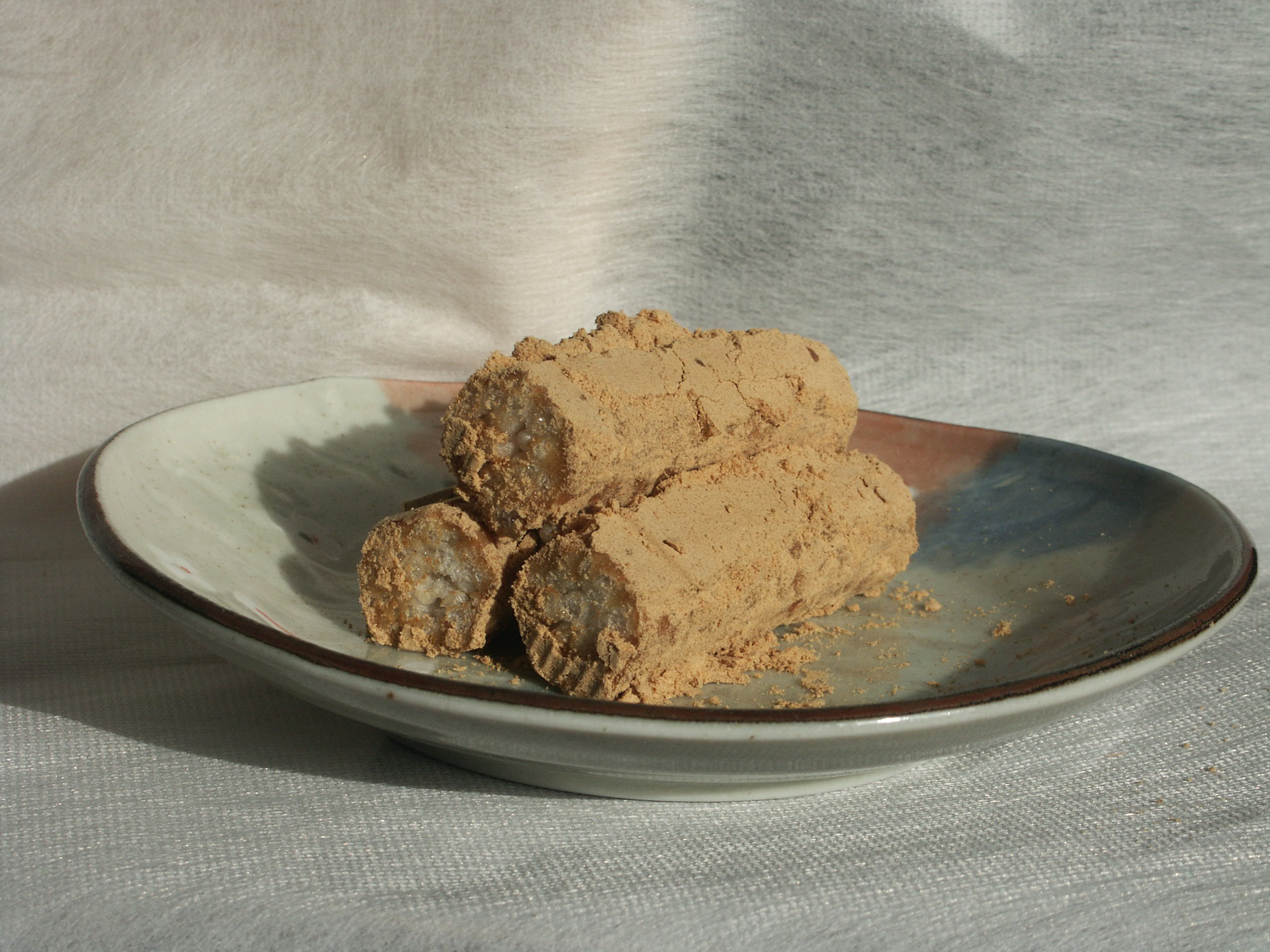
- Type: sweet
- Place of origin: Japan
- Region or state: Saitama prefecture
- Main ingredients: sweetened rice cake, sugar
- Ingredients generally used: soybean powder

Gokabou (五家宝) is one of the Japanese wagashi, which is made and sold mainly in Saitama prefecture. Okoshi, a sweetened cake made of rice, is mixed with sugar and then shaped into a thumb-sized cylinder. Wrapped in a sheet made by starch syrup and soybean powder and coated with soybean powder. Gokabou is known as Saitama prefecture Kumagaya city souvenir sweet. They are rarely served as a dessert for school lunch in the public elementary and secondary school.

Gokabou is one of the three famous confection in Saitama along with Soka Senbei from Kazo city and Imogashi (desserts made of sweet potatoes) from Kawagoe city. It is also qualified as a 100-year food. The name, Gokabou, means that five grains are a family's treasure. It is also one of the special products of the Kazo city and has been sold for the past 150 years.

Since it is a storable cake, it became popular as a souvenir treat and spread through Japan. The process for making the dessert entails a unique traditional technique. Relatively additive-free and considered easy to digest, Gokabou attracts those looking for a healthier sweet.

== History ==
It was first eaten and made as nonperishables. It gradually shifted and became famous as a homemade sweet. It became popular after 1883 when a railroad was first opened from Ueno to Kumagaya, and people started to sell at the station.
