= Akumaki =

Japanese confection

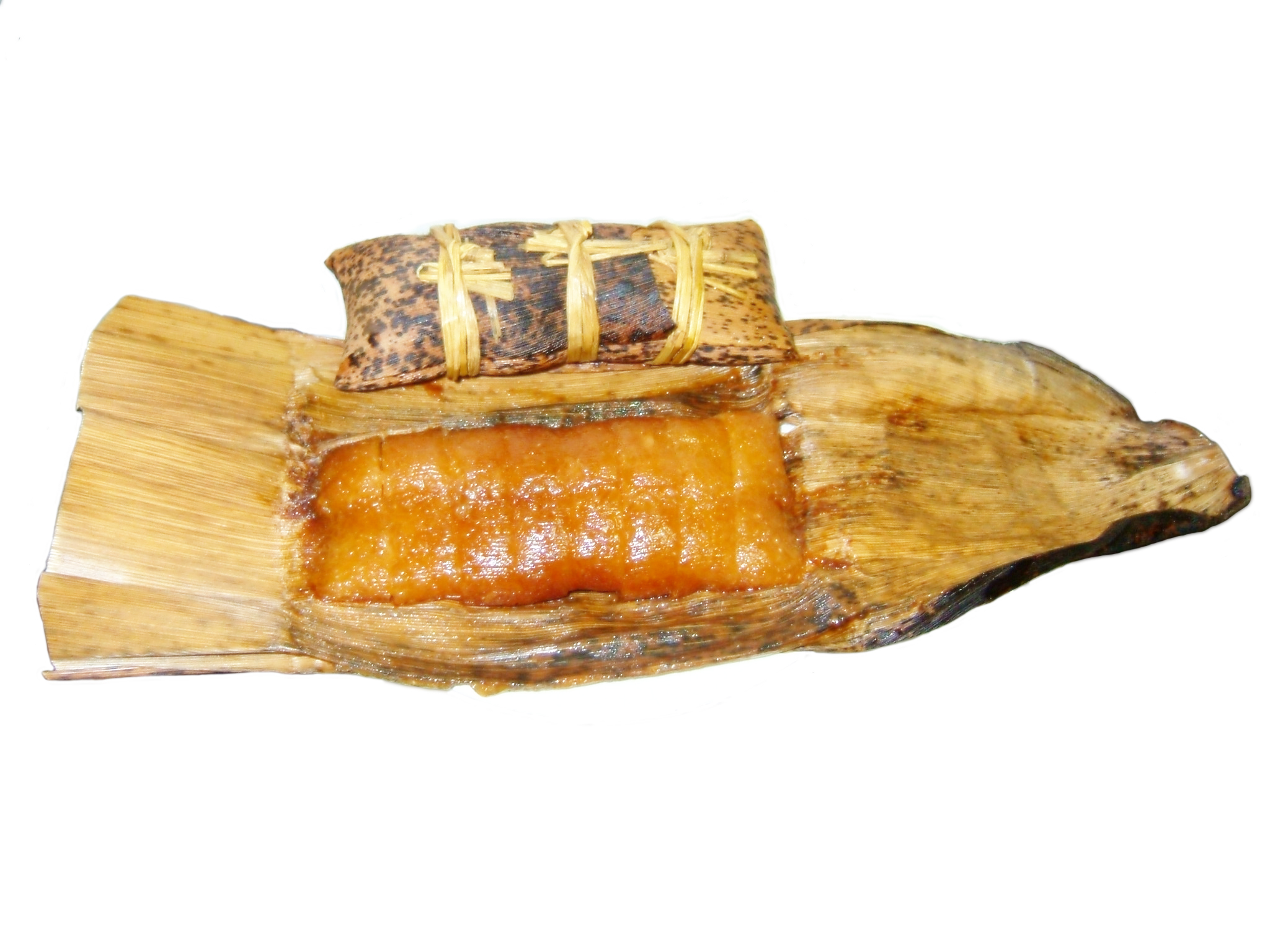
Akumaki

Akumaki (あくまき; 灰汁巻き) is a Japanese-style confection, or wagashi made in Kagoshima, Miyazaki, and Kumamoto Prefecture during the Boys’ Festival on May 5. It is more widely called chimaki in Japan, and are similar to, and historically originate from, Chinese zongzi, traditionally eaten during the Dragon boat festival.

== Preparation and consumption ==
Akumaki is made by soaking glutinous rice wrapped in bamboo leaves in lye overnight. Because it's slightly bitter, it's typically eaten with blended sugar and toasted soybean flour (kinako), with a little salt or soaked in honey. It has an unusual flavor and is considered an acquired taste.

== History ==
It is said that akumaki began as a long-term provision for samurai during the Battle of Sekigahara (1600) or the Japanese invasions of Korea (1592–1598). Also, Saigō Takamori (1821–1877) took akumaki as a nonperishable commodity to the battlefield during the Satsuma Rebellion (1877). Akumaki became popular in the north of Miyazaki Prefecture and Kumamoto Prefecture due to that rebellion.

== Storage and distribution ==
It can be kept for about one week at normal temperature, for about two weeks in a refrigerator, and can also be frozen. Vacuum-packed akumaki can be found in many places as a souvenir, but it is usually a homemade confection. Recently, since the opening of the Kyushu Shinkansen train line, akumaki has attracted considerable attention as a slow food. Akumaki is sold in hotels of Kagoshima, roadside stations (michi no eki), over the internet and in supermarkets throughout Kagoshima prefecture.

== See also ==
- Zongzi
