= Kimia Khatoon =

2004 novel by Saideh Ghods

- Author: Saideh Ghods
- Language: Persian
- Publication date: 2004
- English publication date: 2011

Kimia Khatoon is a Persian language novel by Saideh Ghods, released in Persian in 2004 and in English in 2011.

Kimia Khatoon has been a best-seller for twelve consecutive months since its publication. It is originally written in Persian. It has been translated into Turkish (where it also became a bestseller) and was (as of February 21, 2011) being translated into English.
The novel is about Rumi's stepdaughter, who found her way in his Hiram after the marriage of her mother, Kera Khatoon, to the Sufi mystic and poet. She then falls in love with Rumi's son, her stepbrother. but she is given in marriage to Rumi's master and friend Shams Tabrizi.

There is a film called Rumi's Kimia in development based on the novel.
