= Karakudamono =

Japanese pastries originating in Ancient China

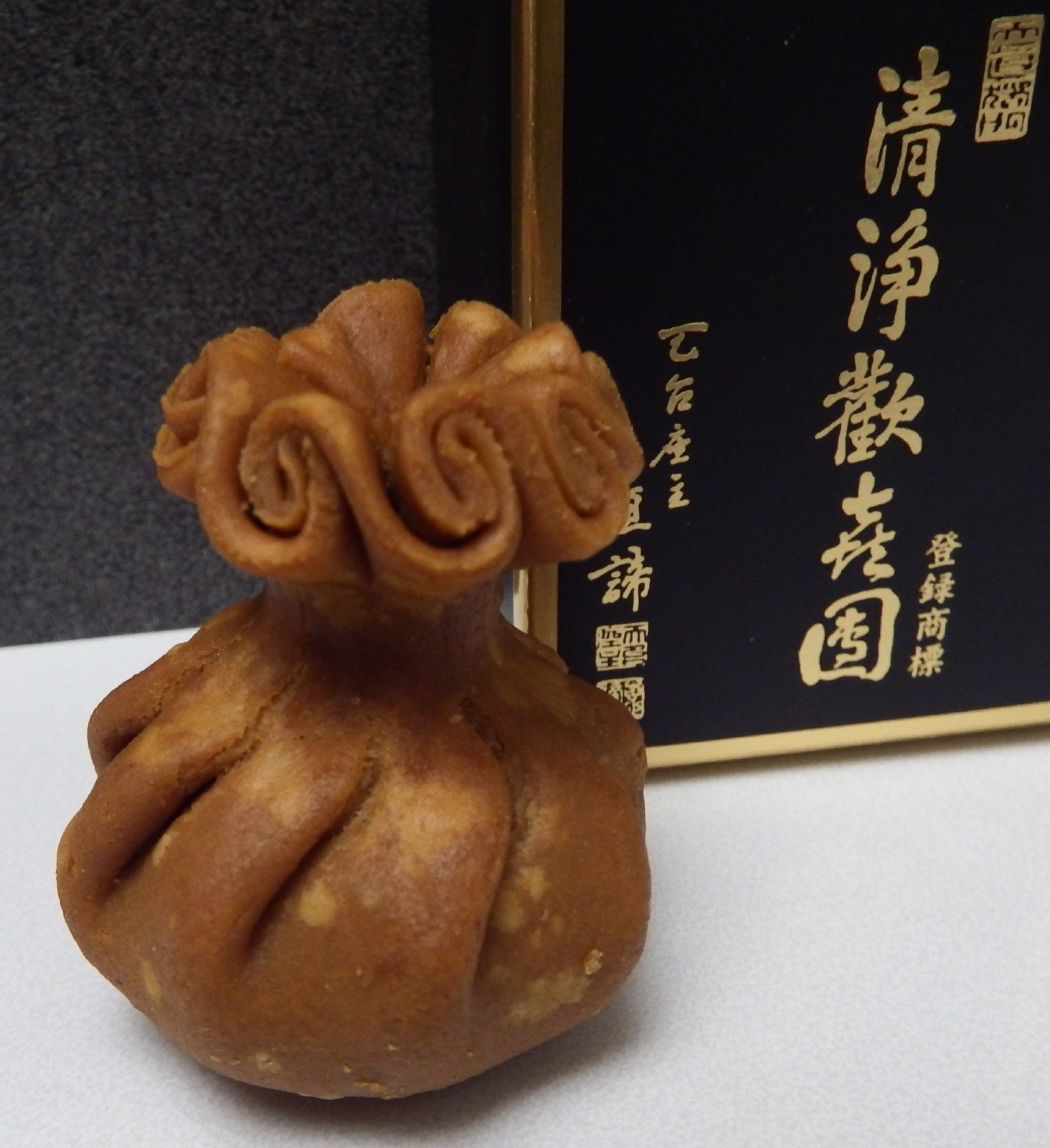
Karakudamono

Karakudamono (Japanese: 唐菓子) is a Japanese term used to collectively describe assorted confections of Chinese origin (also called tōgashi) that were introduced to Japan through the efforts of an envoy to Tang China. These Chinese-style confections were used as offerings at Shinto shrines and Buddhist temples. During the Heian period the confections become an important feature of the newly established Japanese aristocracy's banquet tables.

Among the earliest recorded karakudamono to reach Japan was a confection of Indian origin called modaka. Known in Chinese as "balls of joy" (huanxituan), its name appears in a Japanese dictionary dating to the early 10th century. This pastry is still sold in Kyoto where it is called seijo̅ kankidan. It is also prepared using traditional methods at Shintō shrines throughout Japan including Kamigamo Jinja in Kyoto, Kasuga Taisha in Nara and Nichieda Jinja in Shiga Prefecture.

Karakudamono are also attested to in The Tale of Genji.

== See also ==
- List of pastries
