= Kimia =

Kimia is an Ancient Greek word and a feminine given name in Persian language. It means elixir of life, alchemy, or the philosopher’s stone. In ancient Persian poetry, kimia means "rare" or "unique."

The word is from the Ancient Greek χημία, khēmia, or χημεία, khēmeia, 'art of alloying metals', from χύμα (khúma, “fluid”), from χέω (khéō, “I pour”).

The ultimate origin of the word is uncertain. According to the Oxford English Dictionary, it may be derived from the greek "χημία", which is derived from the ancient Egyptian name of Egypt, khem or khm, khame, or khmi, meaning "blackness", i.e., the rich dark soil of the Nile river valley. Therefore, alchemy can be seen as the "Egyptian art" or the "black art". However, it is also possible that al-kīmiyāʾ derived from χημεία, meaning "cast together".

Alchemy is a philosophical and protoscientific tradition practiced throughout Europe, Africa, and Asia. It aims to purify, mature, and perfect certain objects. Latin words for Chemistry are derived from the Ancient Greek word χημία (kimia.)

The meaning of Kimia, in the Persian literature refers to what is behind the ‘materialistic’ conception of alchemy, and instead to the secret of the spirit’s action in nature and the Universe, the macro-cosmos. By acquiring this secular wisdom of action, alchemists aspired to discover their inner (microcosmic) reality, and transmute themselves.

The word appears ubiquitously in Persian literature. Some early usages can be seen in Vis and Ramin and Ferdowsi’s Shahnameh.

Other samples in verse and prose are:

که کیمیای سعادت در این جهان سخن است
بزرجمهر چنین گفته بود با کسری

—Naser Khosrow
Translation:

The rare of happiness is what counts in life,
Told Kasra his minister Bozorgmehr

صدهزاران کیمیا حق آفرید
کیمیایی همچو صبر آدم ندید

—Rumi
Translation:

A hundred thousand unique things created by The Truth
Yet no alchemy like patience is known to Man

The word Kimia has been frequently used in other Persian poetry, including those of Hafez Shirazi:

از کیمیای مهر تو زر گشت روی من
آری به یمن لطف شما خاک زر شود

Translation:

By your love’s power of transformation, my face became bright gold
Thanks to your grace, the dust can become gold.

and also:

آنان که خاک را به نظر کیمیا کنند
آیا بُوَد که گوشه چشمی به ما کنند؟

Translation:

Those whose glance turns lead into gold,
Will they ever our sight behold?

== Notable people ==
- Kimia Alizadeh (born 1998), Iranian Olympian athlete and taekwondo player
- Kimia Hosseini (born 2003), Iranian actress
- Kimiya Yui (油井 亀美也) (born 1970), Japanese astronaut
- Kimiya Sato (佐藤 公哉) (born 1989), Japanese racing driver
