= Jintan (Japanese medicine) =

Japanese medicine and candy

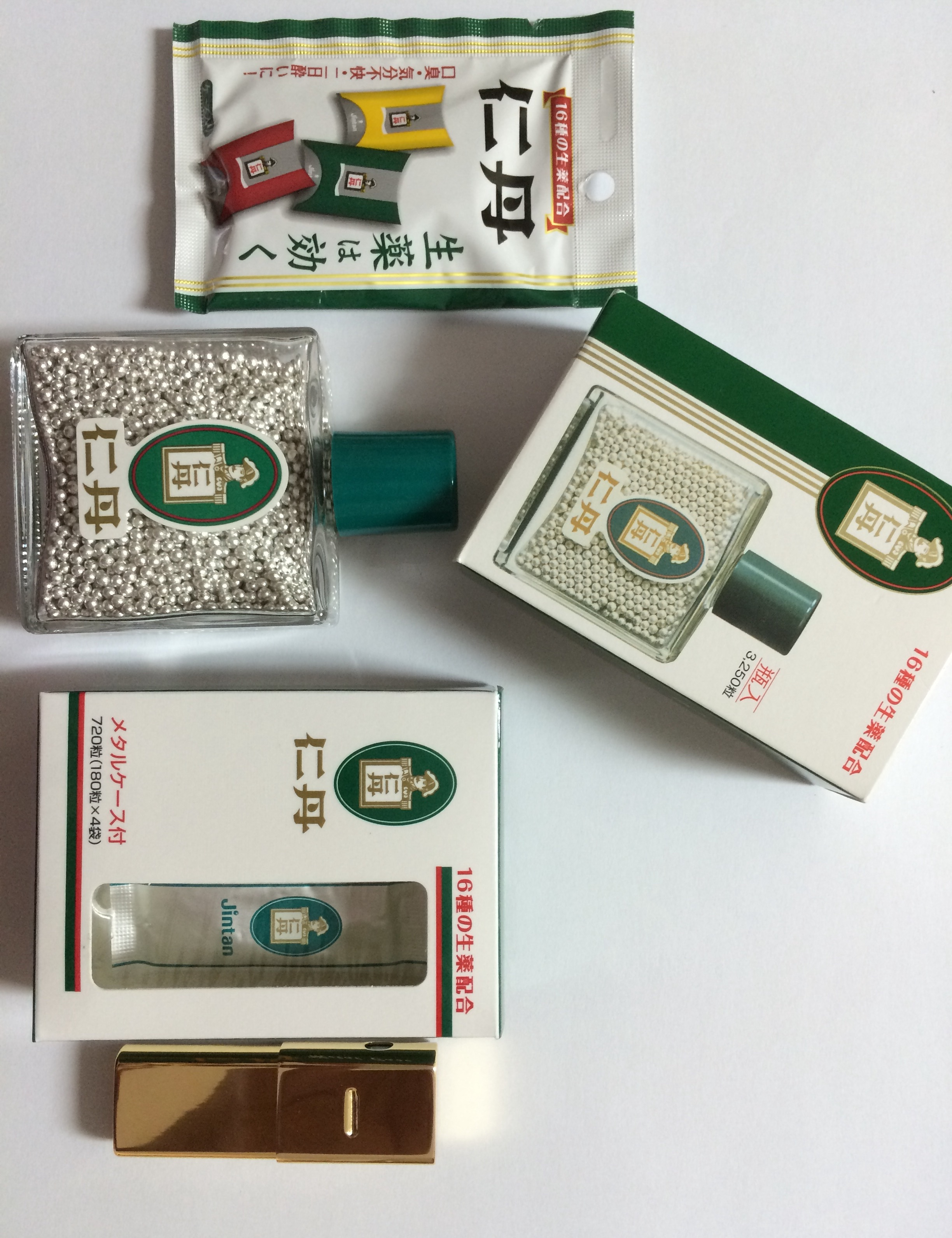
Jintan purchased at Tokyo Station in December 2014

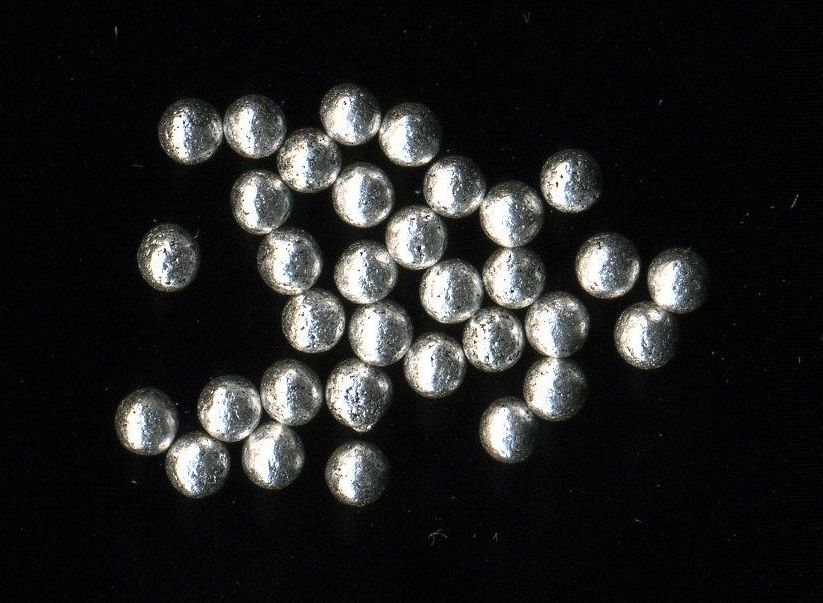
Jintan pearls

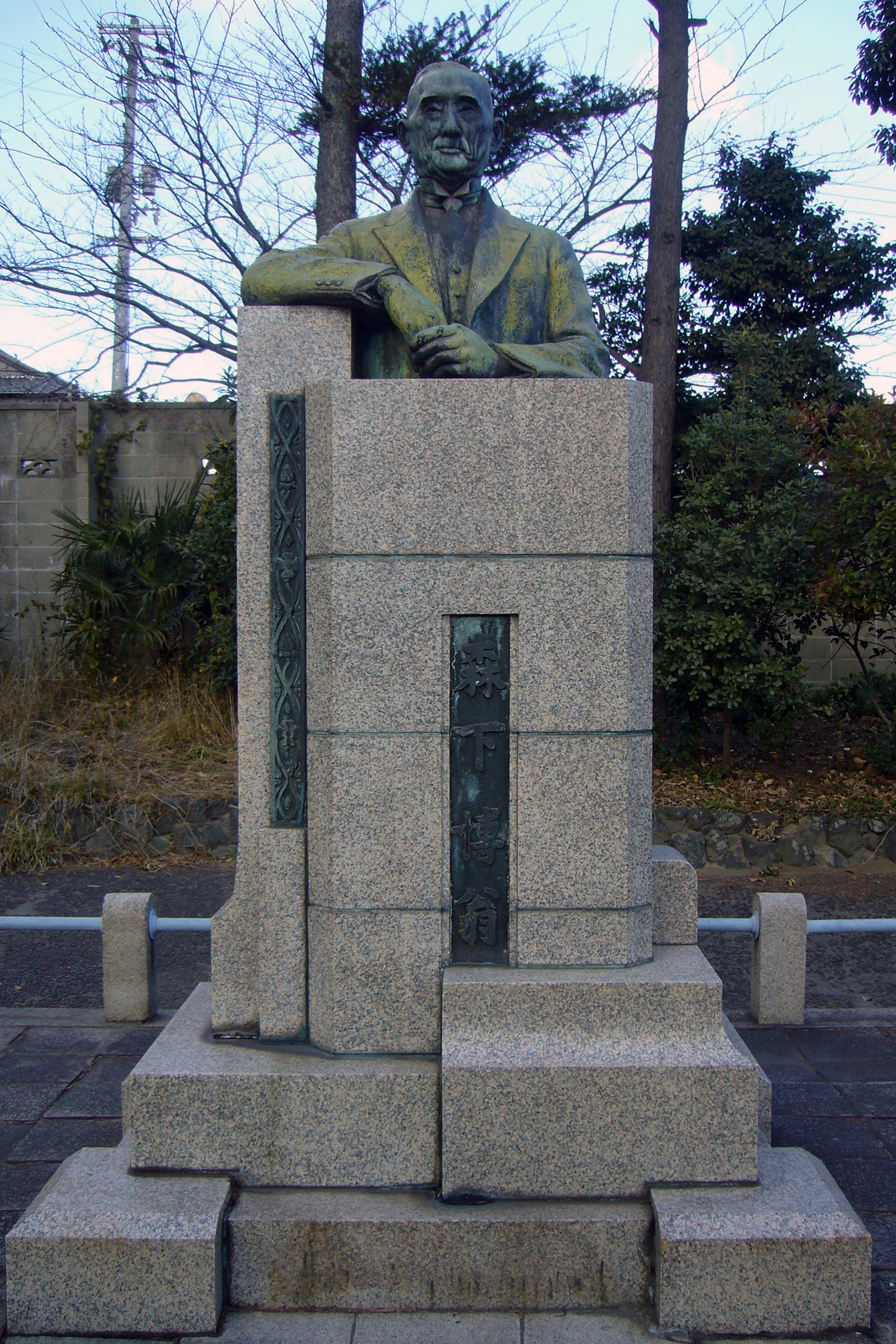
Statue of Morishita Hiroyoshi (Nunakuma-Shrine, Fukuyama)

Jintan (仁丹) is the trademarked name of a popular Japanese medicine/candy, developed by Morishita Hiroshi (1869–1943), and sold from the early twentieth century to today. Originally marketed as a cure-all for a number of ailments, Jintan is today thought of as a breath freshener and a candy.

== History ==
Morishita Hiroshi was the eldest son of a priest at the Nunakuma-Shrine (沼名前神社, Numakuma jinja) in Fukuyama, Hiroshima.

After his father died, Morishita went to Osaka, and started to develop pharmaceutical products.

He was also a pioneer of Japanese advertising.

The silver coated pellet-like pills were advertised from 1904 through the end of World War II in 1945.

== Meaning of Name ==
The name Jintan combines the Confucian term jin (仁, humaneness, benevolence), with the Daoist term tan (丹, cinnabar, pills containing cinnabar, pills (the Elixir of life)) evoking the notion of longevity and health.

== Composition ==
Jintan has about 16 ingredients including cinnamon, mint, cumin, clove, and Fructus Amomi.

The pills contain or contained the metal silver. A 1987 case report in the Hiroshima journal of medical sciences documented a woman who had taken 500 Jintan pills a day for nineteen years and subsequently developed a blue tint to her skin, a condition known as argyria.

== Packaging ==
During the Russo-Japanese War the packaging was re-designed as a Meiji period soldier in court dress with bicorne.

== Literature ==
- Sōgō hokenyaku Jintan kara sōgō hoken sangyō JINTAN e – Morishita Jintan 100nen kinenshi. Osaka: Jintan, 1995.
- Machida Shinobu: Jintan ha naze nigai? Meiji-Taishōki no yakuhin kōkoku- zuhanshū. Tokyo, Borantia jōhō-nettowaaku, 1997.
