= Kimiya (Japanese given name) =

Origin
- Origin: Japanese
- Meaning: Righteous (Different meanings depending on the kanji used)

Kimiya (written: 公弥, 公哉 or 亀美也) is a Japanese given name. Notable people with the name include:

- Kimiya Moriyama (森山 公弥) (born 2002), Japanese footballer
- Kimiya Sato (佐藤 公哉) (born 1989), Japanese racing driver
- Kimiya Yui (油井 亀美也) (born 1970), Japanese astronaut
