= List of Kamen Rider Wizard episodes =

This is a list of episodes of the 2012–2013 Kamen Rider Series Kamen Rider Wizard.

== Episodes ==
No.	Title	Directed by	Written by	Original release date
1	"The Ringed Wizard"; Transliteration: "Yubiwa no Mahōtsukai" (Japanese: 指輪の魔法使い)	Shojiro Nakazawa	Tsuyoshi Kida	September 2, 2012
A police squad led by Detective Amino arrives at a warehouse, where workers are being attacked by strange creatures. Rookie Detective Rinko Daimon and the police are outmatched by the Ghouls and their leader Minotauros until a youth named Haruto Soma arrives, who Minotauros identifies as a wizard. Haruto transforms into Wizard and dispatches the Ghouls before breaking one of Minotauros' horns, forcing him to retreat. After summoning his Plamonsters to search for Minotauros, Haruto is confronted by Rinko. He explains to her that humans with magic potential, known as Gates, are being targeted by Phantoms, monsters that emerge from Gates who have given in to their own despair. Demanding more information from him and seeing him as a potential threat upon revealing that he has a Phantom inside him, she arrests him. At the police station, Rinko is informed by an injured Amino and the police chief that they are dropping the case due to being unable to handle the threat. While heading to free Haruto, Koyomi passes by Rinko and Amino, detecting a strange aura within the latter. The Blue Unicorn Plamonster breaks into Haruto's cell to deliver him a message from Koyomi, warning him that Amino is the Phantom they are seeking. After deducing that Rinko is the Gate, he uses the Small Magic Ring to shrink himself and ride on Blue Unicorn to break out of jail. Meanwhile, at a park, Rinko explains to Amino that she became a detective because her father was a policeman. Amino reveals himself to be Minotauros and destroys the locket, forcing her into despair. Haruto and Koyomi intervene; while Koyomi looks after Rinko, Haruto transforms into Kamen Rider Wizard to battle the Phantom. Kamen Rider Wizard uses his Land Style and Hurricane Style attacks before finishing off Minotauros with Flame Style's Strike Wizard Rider Kick. When Rinko's body begins to show signs of a Phantom about to emerge, Kamen Rider Wizard places an Engage Ring on her right hand and enters her Underworld to neutralize her inner Phantom Jabberwock using his Winger Wizardragon and the WizarSword Gun. No longer a Gate, Rinko awakens on a park bench and looks at the Engage Ring on her hand as Haruto takes Koyomi back home.
2	"I Want to Be a Wizard"; Transliteration: "Mahōtsukai ni Naritai" (Japanese: 魔法使いになりたい)	Shojiro Nakazawa	Junko Kōmura; Tsuyoshi Kida	September 9, 2012
At a park, Medusa and Phoenix summon the Phantom Hellhound to target another Gate within the premises. As Hellhound attacks Shunpei Nara and a group of children, Haruto intervenes and transforms into Kamen Rider Wizard to battle the Phantom. After Hellhound retreats, Shunpei approaches Haruto and asks him to make him his apprentice; after Haruto refuses, Shunpei pursues him throughout town. Shunpei finally corners Haruto at the Donut Shop Hungry and tells him that he wants to help people with magic, but Haruto explains that the world does not need any more wizards and tells Shunpei to keep dreaming before leaving. Meanwhile, after being questioned by Superintendent Masanori Kizaki of National Security Bureau Section Zero for her involvement with Kamen Rider Wizard, Rinko goes to the Antique Shop Omokagedō to look for Haruto. There, she meets Koyomi and Shigeru Wajima. Koyomi explains to Rinko that, six months ago, on the day of a solar eclipse, she and Haruto were kidnapped along with many other Gates to be forced into despair during a sacrificial ritual. While nearly everyone was consumed by their Phantoms, Haruto fought to contain the Phantom within him. After the eclipse, a mysterious person donning an orange mask and a white robe laid an unconscious Koyomi next to Haruto and granted him the Wizardriver and the Wizard Rings. As a result of the incident, Koyomi lost her memories of her life from before the event while Haruto became a wizard, vowing never to let anyone become a Phantom. Later, Shunpei is picking up a children's book at a library when he is surrounded by Hellhound and a platoon of Ghouls. As a Ghoul corners him against a tree, he suddenly casts a weak flame-throwing spell before Haruto arrives. Shunpei is told to run, but he is in shock from casting a spell, and Rinko intervenes to save him from another Ghoul. Kamen Rider Wizard disposes of the Ghouls before chasing Hellhound on motorcycle, ultimately blasting it into a warehouse with his WizarSword Gun. After running for safety, Shunpei realizes that he can wield magic.
3	"Transform! Live Broadcast"; Transliteration: "Henshin! Namachūkei" (Japanese: 変身！生中継)	Shojiro Nakazawa	Junko Kōmura; Tsuyoshi Kida	September 16, 2012
Excited over his newly discovered ability to create fire from his hands, Shunpei starts showing off his magical powers to the children at the park before being invited by Kazuo Tajima of TV Yūhi for an interview on his Morning Island show. After doing a short demonstration in front of the camera, Shunpei is offered a spot on live TV before Haruto finds him. At the Hungry stand, Shunpei tries to show off his power to Haruto, but to no avail. Upon remembering that Hellhound breathes fire, Haruto realizes that the Phantom survived and is playing mind games on Shunpei. Despite Haruto attempting to explain this to him, Shunpei accuses him of keeping him down before leaving. Meanwhile, revealing he had faked his death through his ability to hide in shadows, Hellhound assures Medusa and Phoenix that a new Phantom will be born the next day. Later that night, at Omokagedō, Haruto ponders on his argument with Shunpei. Wajima reminds him of how they met six months ago, when Haruto and Koyomi traced the origin of the Flame Ring to Wajima and asked him to craft more rings to battle the Phantoms. Haruto's conviction is restored after he receives a new Wizard Ring and is told that it might help light the way for him. The next morning, Haruto receives a phone call from Rinko about Shunpei on TV. Realizing that Tajima is the Phantom orchestrating Shunpei's fall, Haruto rushes to the TV station to save Shunpei as he is publicly humiliated on national TV when his "magic" fails. Delighting in his target's misery, Hellhound reveals himself before entering Shunpei's shadow to force him into incinerating the Forest Wizard book and completely send him into despair. Kamen Rider Wizard battles Hellhound and uses the Light Magic Ring to flush out the Phantom from the shadows before transforming to Water Style to counter the Phantom's flame attacks and destroy him with the Water Slash Strike. Giving Shunpei an Engage Ring, Kamen Rider Wizard enters his Underworld and manages to destroy the inner Phantom Cyclops while retrieving a mental copy of the Forest Wizard. Later, as Rinko arrives at Omokagedō to inform Haruto about the media blackout involving his fight with Hellhound, she learns that Shunpei is now Haruto's assistant, to Koyomi's dismay.
4	"The Doll and the Pianist"; Transliteration: "Ningyō to Pianisuto" (Japanese: 人形とピアニスト)	Satoshi Morota	Tsuyoshi Kida	September 23, 2012
In the Antique Shop Omokagedō, Rinko sees Haruto and Koyomi sitting together, with the latter glowing brightly. Meanwhile, at a junkyard, Misa and Yugo awaken Caitsith and order him to hunt down a new Gate in the form of pianist Eisaku Takagi. As Caitsith attacks Eisaku at a conservatory, Haruto intervenes while Rinko brings Eisaku to safety. After the Phantom retreats, Haruto and Rinko explain to Eisaku his situation as a Gate, but Eisaku is more concerned about his upcoming piano competition and is not worried about being attacked. It is revealed that Eisaku was a well renowned pianist who swept every contest he participated in, but has not won anything since joining the conservatory; as such, he hopes for the upcoming competition to be his big comeback. Koyomi and Shunpei arrive at the conservatory, where Koyomi reveals to Rinko that she can see through a Phantom's disguise. As they get into an argument, Caitsith shows up in his human form and Haruto and Rinko pursue him, but lose him past the Donut Shop Hungry. Meanwhile, Koyomi and Shunpei follow Eisaku toward a lake, concerned about his safety, when Misa appears. However, Medusa targets Koyomi instead of Eisaku, entangling her with her hair and siphoning her magical power before leaving. Haruto recharges Koyomi's magical power through her Please Magic Ring. Caitsith once again targets Eisaku, intending to chop off his hands, but Eisaku offers that he finish the job, much to the Phantom's dismay. Kamen Rider Wizard arrives to once again do battle with Caitsith and traps him with the Bind Magic Ring. However, as he prepares to execute the Flame Style's Strike Wizard Rider Kick, the spell malfunctions, as he is out of magical power.
5	"The Deciding Match of the Contest"; Transliteration: "Kessen no Konkūru" (Japanese: 決戦のコンクール)	Satoshi Morota	Tsuyoshi Kida	September 30, 2012
Taking advantage of Haruto's sudden loss of magical power, Caitsith escapes. Haruto confronts Takagi, as he realizes the pianist wanted the Phantom to cripple him and take him out of the piano competition. Koyomi blames herself for Haruto's loss, as he had used all of his remaining magical power to reanimate her. Haruto leaves with her, but suddenly passes out. Back at the Antique Shop Omokagedō, as Koyomi watches over Haruto, Wajima explains to Rinko and Shunpei that Koyomi is a Gate whose body was somehow preserved after her Phantom was manifested. As the Phantom had taken her life and memories, she needs a regular supply of magical power from Haruto in order to survive. Upon awakening, Haruto explains to Koyomi that even a negative person like Takagi needs hope. Later that night, Koyomi, Rinko and Shunpei visit Takagi. Koyomi argues with Takagi over his fear of facing the present and moving on to the future, assuring him that Haruto will be there to protect him. The next day, as Takagi performs at the competition, Caitsith unleashes an army of Ghouls and prepares to crash the event. However, he is stopped by Kamen Rider Wizard, who uses the Copy Magic Ring to duplicate himself and destroy the Ghouls before finishing off the Phantom with the Hurricane Style's Slash Strike. After the competition, Takagi tells Haruto that, despite his loss, he has decided to move on by moving overseas and starting over with his career.
6	"To a Beautiful Flower"; Transliteration: "Kirei na Hana ni wa" (Japanese: キレイな花には)	Kenzo Maihara	Junko Kōmura	October 7, 2012
While visiting Hungry for a sugar doughnut, Haruto is envious upon learning that the manager's normally silent worker has fallen in love with a beautiful girl and bought stone bracelets from her. At Omokagedō, Koyomi finds Shunpei and Wajima have also found love themselves. Later, Haruto finds the Phantom Gnome attacking a rich man named Yamagata and his girlfriend Manami. Overpowered by Kamen Rider Wizard in Hurricane Style, Gnome escapes into the ground, with Wizard sending Blue Unicorn after him. Brought to Yamagata's manor, Haruto informs him and Manami of the Phantom's intent and calls Rinko to help him keep an eye on them and find out who is the Gate that Gnome is after. However, upon hearing that Rinko is a cop, Manami decides to go home with Haruto, accompanying him before ditching him upon learning that he can only use his magic to fight Phantoms. By the time Haruto finds Manami, she is surrounded by Shunpei, Wajima, and the donut shop worker, who all claim to be dating her. Exposed to have been scamming money off her dates and not seeing anything wrong about it, Manami is dragged underground by Gnome. Alerted by Blue Unicorn and using his Land Style to reach Manami, Kamen Rider Wizard fights the Ghouls before saving Manami as he explains that saving her is something he must do regardless of her profession. When Gnome causes a cave in to escape, Haruto finds that Manami had left during the fight.
7	"Buying Memories"; Transliteration: "Omoide o Kau Tame ni" (Japanese: 思い出を買うために)	Kenzo Maihara	Junko Kōmura	October 14, 2012
Since Manami went off the grid, with Koyomi unable to find her or Gnome while he takes the Smell Ring from a heartbroken Wajima as he was about to destroy it, Haruto returns to Yamagata's manor. There, he learns that Yamagata knew Manami was playing him, but felt there was a good reason for her needing his money. After getting a call from Rinko that she got Manami's address from the Renaissance Gym, Haruto joins the cop and they make their way to her house. Approaching the house, they find Manami attacked by Gnome, with Haruto driving the Phantom off and becoming Kamen Rider Wizard to fight him. However, Gnome escapes and Haruto returns to find Manami having run off as Rinko saw ads for the house that appears in a childhood photograph of Manami. Catching up to Manami to give her back her photo, Haruto learns she intends to buy back her childhood home to preserve it. Haruto tells her that he understands losing a family before he and Manami see her childhood home in flames and Gnome waiting inside for them. Using Water Style to take out the flames, Kamen Rider Wizard takes Manami outside and tells her to not be consumed by her past and to focus on the present before going after Gnome. As Manami realizes he is right, Wizard finds himself in a predicament with Gnome's burrowing fighting style before becoming Kamen Rider Wizard Land Style with the Big Ring to force the Phantom to the surface and use the Smell Ring to overwhelm his senses. Wizard then finishes Gnome off with a Drill Strike Wizard kick. Soon after, Manami thanks Haruto with the intent to turn herself in and Rinko arrives with Yamagata, who is revealed to be buying the property so Manami can buy it from him once she serves time. Elsewhere, with four Phantoms killed since Wizard's appearance, Phoenix takes Gnome's failure personally as he loses it.
8	"A New Magic Stone"; Transliteration: "Aratana Mahōseki" (Japanese: 新たな魔宝石)	Shojiro Nakazawa	Junko Kōmura	October 21, 2012
At Omokagedō, Shunpei looks at the Wizard Rings that Wajima made before finding a strange Magic Ring Haruto cannot use. A White Garuda arrives with a box as the gang attempts to capture the Plamonster. Koyomi opens the box to find a red Magic Stone that reacts with the Magic Ring as Wajima takes it to make a new Wizard Ring. While on a walk with Shunpei and Rinko, Haruto realizes the White Garuda may belong to the White Wizard before being alerted to a boy named Hiroki Itoh being attacked by Ghouls. Transforming to fight, Kamen Rider Wizard destroys the Ghouls while Rinko and Shunpei look after the child. When Haruto asks where the boy lives, Rinko is arrested after trying to keep Hiroki from running off. After clearing up things at the station, Hiroki's mother arrives and Haruto recognizes her Mikiko Itoh, the nurse who attempted to save his parents after being mortally wounded in a car crash. Haruto informs the woman of her son's endangerment while promising to look after him. However, Hiroki refuses to go home as Mikiko entrusts her son to live at Omokagedō. Later that night, Hiroki reveals to Haruto that he ran away from home due to his father never listening to him and Mikiko sides with him. However, Haruto shows him that Mikiko is concerned, convincing Hiroki to talk with his mother the following day. Elsewhere, when Medusa refuses to let him go after Wizard when her Ghouls failed to get the boy, Phoenix asks for Wiseman's permission to put an end to Wizard's meddling in their affairs. Wiseman allows this and gives Phoenix an idea to place the young Gate in despair. The next day, Phoenix attacks Mikiko as Haruto and Hiroki arrive. Haruto becomes Wizard to fight Phoenix as Shunpei and a concerned Hiroki take the latter's mother to the hospital, only to find out that his magic is no match for the Phantom, as he throws him over the bridge into the water below.
9	"The Dragon's Cry"; Transliteration: "Doragon no Sakebi" (Japanese: ドラゴンの叫び)	Shojiro Nakazawa	Junko Kōmura	October 28, 2012
As Mikiko is hospitalized, Rinko rescues Haruto from the river and brings him back to Omokagedō. Though confused that he was saved by WizarDragon while told that Mikiko is unconscious, Haruto realizes that Phoenix's objective is to kill Hiroki's parents to put him into despair. Reaching Hiroki's father in time with Hurricane Style, yet too weak to fight, Kamen Rider Wizard takes him to the hospital before collapsing due to his low mana levels. After having a nightmare about Phoenix killing Hiroki's parents and the boy's Phantom manifesting, Haruto awakens to find the former alive and well while Hiroki blames himself for their condition. With the scene reminding him of his own parents, Haruto tells Hiroki that this is not his fault and that he must not give up on hope. Knowing that killing Phoenix is the only way to save Hiroki's parents, Haruto confides in Rinko that he is scared of standing by and let them die, but does not know how to deal with the Phantom. However, Koyomi arrives with the ring Wajima made from the stone brought by the White Garuda. As Haruto takes it, he senses WizarDragon reacting to the ring and realizes it will let him use his inner Phantom's power. Phoenix arrives, with Haruto telling a concerned Rinko that seeking his inner Phantom's aid is the only way to stop the Phantom. Wizard attempts to use the Flame Dragon Ring before managing to contact WizarDragon within his Underworld. WizarDragon warns him that, although the Transformation Ring can channel his power, its use may eventually cause Haruto to be consumed by despair. However, upon hearing Haruto's retort that the dragon's power is his hope, an amused WizarDragon decides to give Wizard the power he desires. With WizarDragon's powers, Wizard transforms into Kamen Rider Wizard Flame Dragon and destroys Phoenix with his Dragon Breath attack. Several days later, Haruto tells the others that Hiroki's parents are recovering and Hiroki is reconnecting with them. Elsewhere, Medusa mockingly muses about Haruto's power to a revived Phoenix.
10	"National Security Bureau Section 0"; Transliteration: "Kokka Anzenkyoku Zero-ka" (Japanese: 国家安全局0課)	Satoshi Morota	Tsuyoshi Kida	November 11, 2012
Despite urging to get back at Haruto, Phoenix is warned by Medusa to not confront him yet, as he has not fully recovered. Soon after Haruto leaves the shop on patrol, operatives of National Security Bureau Section Zero take Wajima into custody. As Kizaki shows Wajima a Magic Stone and demands that he make a Wizard Ring with it, Haruto saves a boy called Naoki from being attacked by the Phantom Gargoyle. He learns from him that he traveled from Akita to Tokyo, and refuses to return home until accomplishing what he came to do. Haruto then escorts him to the NSB, where he finds Rinko questioning Kizaki about Wajima. Naoki wishes to speak with Kizaki about what he knows regarding his father's death, but he refuses to cooperate. Back at the shop, Naoki reveals to the others that Kizaki was his father's partner at the NSB and a close friend of his family, but he started avoiding him after his death. The following day, Haruto confronts Kizaki, questioning if he always knew that Naoki is a Gate and asking the officer to let him take care of the Phantoms by himself, but he does not listen to him. When they are informed that Naoki is missing, they go to the place where his father died, where he is attacked again by Gargoyle. After Haruto drives off the Phantom, Naoki confronts Kizaki, accusing him of abandoning his father to die in order to save himself.
11	"The Promise to Defend"; Transliteration: "Mamorinuku Yakusoku" (Japanese: 守り抜く約束)	Satoshi Morota	Tsuyoshi Kida	November 18, 2012
Asking Kizaki to let him talk to Naoki, Haruto learns the youth's reasons before Kizaki tells him that he will look after Naoki from now on. Later, after checking up on Wajima and learning that only one with magic like Haruto can use a Magic Ring, Kizaki sets up a decoy operation to keep the Phantoms' attention on him. However, fighting a losing battle against the Ghouls, Kamen Rider Wizard Hurricane Style arrives to eliminate the monsters. Suddenly, Phoenix arrives and overpowers Wizard in both Hurricane and Water Styles before "Naoki" is unmasked as Kizaki's aide. Confronting him, Haruto learns that Kizaki made a promise to Katayama to keep his son safe, as he attempted to kill Gargoyle after the Phantom received orders to create a Phantom from Naoki. However, Medusa expected Kizaki's plan, and her suspicion is proven to be correct when Naoki is about to be taken. Using the Plamonsters to hold Gargoyle at bay, Rinko takes Naoki to safety before the Phantom catches up to them. Upon knocking Rinko out, Gargoyle reveals that he killed Naoki's father when he attempted to stop him. This causes Naoki to blame himself and begin to fall into despair as Haruto arrives with Kizaki, transforming into Wizard while Kizaki tends to Naoki and tells him not to give up. As Naoki begins to crack, Wizard becomes Kamen Rider Wizard Flame Dragon to destroy Gargoyle before entering Naoki's Underworld to exterminate the youth's inner Phantom, Jörmungandr. Later, Kizaki sends Wajima back to Omokagedō with the Magic Stone as his way of affirming Haruto as an ally.
12	"The Wagashi of Hope"; Transliteration: "Kibō no Wagashi" (Japanese: 希望の和菓子)	Ryuta Tasaki	Junko Kōmura	November 25, 2012
With the Magic Stone from Kizaki, Wajima creates two new WizarDragon-related Wizard Rings for Haruto. Wanting to reach a new level like him, Shunpei decides to accompany Haruto in his search for Phantoms, but ends up getting himself in trouble. After being sent home, Shunpei encounters Tetsuya Inagaki, one of his old upperclassmen from high school, who is now an apprentice under the Wagashi shop Matsukian, run by Shozo Matsuki. Leaving Shunpei to make his delivery to a regular, Tetsuya is attacked by the Phantom Valkyrie before Haruto arrives and becomes Kamen Rider Wizard to fight Valkyrie before the Phantom falls back. However, the manjū that Tetsuya was delivering is destroyed and the shop ends up losing a restaurant owner as their important customer, which worsens their situation as Matsuki is on the verge of bankruptcy. Refusing to stand by and do nothing, Shunpei sells manjū to help the shop before a man named Katsuya Kiritani offers to buy a six-month supply from Matsuki for five hundred yen a day. Accepting the offer, Matsuki bakes manjū and brands them "Kibō". As morning breaks, still feeling something is off, Haruto has Yellow Kraken follow Shunpei and Matsuki to the Narushimaya department store where they are to bring the manjū to. However, when Shunpei learns that he tricked them into wasting most of their supplies, Kiritani reveals himself to be Valkyrie and that his true target is Matsuki. Shunpei and Matsuki attempt to outrun Valkyrie before Haruto arrives and becomes Kamen Rider Wizard to fight the Phantom and his Ghouls with the Copy Ring before assuming Hurricane Style. Kamen Rider Wizard proceeds to use the Hurricane Dragon Ring to become Kamen Rider Wizard Hurricane Dragon and eliminate the Ghouls with the Thunder Ring. However, Valkyrie escapes the attack and takes Shunpei hostage.
13	"The Heir to the Dream"; Transliteration: "Yume o Tsugu Mono" (Japanese: 夢を継ぐ者)	Ryuta Tasaki	Junko Kōmura	December 2, 2012
Using Shunpei as a shield before throwing him away, Valkyrie escapes as Kamen Rider Wizard saves his friend. Taking Matsuki and Tetsuya to Omokagedō, Haruto reveals how he knew Matsuki was the Phantom's true target, with the monster succeeding in putting him in a spot to close business. The next day, Shunpei begins to question how he can truly help Haruto as Rinko convinces him that he can make himself useful by supporting him. With a renewed outlook, Shunpei heads to Matsukian and gives Tetsuya a similar speech before attempting to convince the restaurant owner to buy Wagashi from Matsuki again. The next day, knowing he will be attacked again, Matsuki leaves Omokagedō with Haruto and Koyomi accompanying him as he asks an old friend of his to take Tetsuya as an apprentice at Bairindo. However, on the way back, learning that Matsuki's hope is for Tetsuya's success, Haruto is alerted by Koyomi to Medusam as the Phantom overheard everything. Confronting Medusa, Haruto becomes Kamen Rider Wizard, but is defeated as his Land and Water Styles are ineffective against her. With Medusa leaving to give Valkyrie his new method of attack, Haruto and company run to the shop and find Tetsuya creating a new batch of manjū after Shunpei talked him into continuing his mentor's legacy. Valkyrie arrives to destroy Tetsuya and the manjū as Haruto becomes Wizard to fight him before becoming Kamen Rider Wizard Hurricane Style and pursues the Phantom. Once Shunpei arrives and saves the last of the manjū from being destroyed, leaving him to look after Tetsuya, Wizard becomes Kamen Rider Wizard Hurricane Dragon to force Valkyrie into an aerial dogfight before destroying him. Later, though Matsukian closes, Matsuki and Tetsuya have a renewed sense of hope while Shunpei is unaware that he helped.
14	"The Return of the Film Director"; Transliteration: "Kaettekita Eiga Kantoku" (Japanese: 帰って来た映画監督)	Kenzo Maihara	Junko Kōmura	December 9, 2012
While out with Haruto and getting a beret, Koyomi sees a strange Plamonster and she and Haruto follow it. However, while following Black Cerberus, Haruto ends up leaving Koyomi to follow the Plamonster and he encounters Medusa when she attacks a youth. Assuming Hurricane Dragon form, Kamen Rider Wizard seemingly defeats Medusa and offers to protect the youth. Arriving to Omokagedō with the youth, Haruto meets an old friend of his named Chizuru Manaka, who reveals his name to be Satoshi Ishii, an aspiring movie director who went missing six months ago. Elsewhere, Koyomi ends up in the middle of the forest and ventures into a cave, where she finds a blue Magic Stone. As Koyomi returns to Omokagedō to give the stone to Wajima, Haruto and the others go to the campus where Satoshi lived to help him finish editing his movie. However, while Chizuru tells the others how he got her into acting, they find Satoshi gone. Fearing the worst, Haruto finds Satoshi and evades numerous attempts on his life. Haruto learns that "Satoshi" is actually the Phantom Lizardman, the first Phantom he encountered six months ago. Battling Wizard so he can escape his execution, Lizardman holds Chizuru hostage being attacked by Medusa, who reveals the girl to be a Gate.
15	"After the Last Scene Is..."; Transliteration: "Rasuto Shīn no Ato wa" (Japanese: ラストシーンの後は)	Kenzo Maihara	Junko Kōmura	December 16, 2012
Assuming Land Style so Chizuru can escape after she is revealed to be a Gate, Kamen Rider Wizard confronts Medusa and Lizardman before they leave. He tells the others what occurred and that they must not tell Chizuru that the Satoshi they met is his Phantom. However, as Wajima starts working on the new Magic Stone brought by Koyomi, Haruto receives a call from Chizuru that she is going to Satoshi's apartment. With Chizuru unaware of what is going on, she attempts to ease the tension between Haruto and "Satoshi". Learning that the film his original self made is what gives Chizuru hope, Lizardman reveals his true form and Chizuru is knocked out as Haruto becomes Wizard to fight the Phantom. He escapes to get the film, intending to destroy it in front of her to drive her into despair. After a night of caring for her, Chizuru runs off in disbelief over what happened yesterday. Haruto follows her and apologizes for not telling her while seeing that her hope stems from her feelings for Satoshi. After getting a call that Lizardman has been sighted with the film, Haruto puts Chizuru to sleep before Rinko and Shunpei arrive with new Wizard Rings created from the blue stone. Once Lizardman arrives, Haruto transforms to Wizard to obtain the film from the Phantom. After the Ghouls are defeated , Wizard uses the Water Dragon Ring to transform into Kamen Rider Wizard Water Dragon to prevent Lizardman from escaping before using Blizzard Ring to freeze the Phantom and shatter him with WizarDragon's tail. When Chizuru comes to, Haruto gives her the Le Reve Route film and claims that Satoshi is alive and went into hiding to study in America. As Chizuru leaves to move on with her life, Haruto knows that he will one day tell her the truth. Elsewhere, finding the stone he produced gone, Wiseman delights in the turn of events.
16	"The Christmas Miracle"; Transliteration: "Kurisumasu no Kiseki" (Japanese: クリスマスの奇跡)	Shojiro Nakazawa	Tsuyoshi Kida	December 23, 2012
With Koyomi taking him to where she found the blue Magic Stone, Haruto feels an evil presence watching them from afar before they return to the city and find Rinko in a Santa outfit as part of a mandatory police program. Alerted to a Phantom attack and coming to the aid of a blond-haired man chased by Ghouls, Haruto transforms into Kamen Rider Wizard to take out the grunts. Despite being informed about his situation at Omokagedō, the man, named Tatsuro, ignores their warnings and leaves while claiming that he has something to do by Christmas Eve. Haruto keeps watch on Tatsuro as he engages in several part-time jobs before stopping to rest as he watches over an orphanage. Haruto questions him about Tatsuro and his connection with the orphanage, but he refrains from answering and leaves. The owner recognizes Tatsuro as he leaves and reveals to Haruto that he was one of the orphans raised there, but fled after involving himself in trouble several years ago. As Haruto hears about the mysterious gifts left at the orphanage on previous Christmases and realizes that they were Tatsuro's doing, he goes after him and finds him with several gifts he bought with his own money. Realizing that it was the gifts he brings to the children that bring him hope, Phoenix appears before them and destroys the gifts, driving Tatsuro into despair as he fights Haruto. Haruto defeats Phoenix once more by combining Kamen Rider Wizard Water Dragon's Blizzard magic with a Slash Strike, which freezes him before being shattered into pieces. Haruto dives into Tatsuro's Underworld to defeat his inner Phantom, Hekatonkheir, where meets a Santa Claus and receives a present from him. Back in the outside world, after a reborn Phoenix leaves, Haruto finds that the present is the Merry Christmas Ring and uses it to restore the destroyed gifts before the item fades away. As Tatsuro is caught delivering the presents to the orphanage by the owner, the two reconcile as Haruto wonders if the one who gave him the ring was the real Santa Claus.
17	"Another Wizard"; Transliteration: "Mō Hitori no Mahōtsukai" (Japanese: もう一人の魔法使い)	Shojiro Nakazawa	Tsuyoshi Kida	January 6, 2013
Finding Phoenix being seemingly serene after his defeat by Kamen Rider Wizard on Christmas Eve, Medusa notices a strange youth as Wiseman appears and dispatches the Phantom Manticore to find out who the presumed Gate is. When the youth is about to eat, Manticore and his Ghouls make their move, but Haruto intervenes. While Rinko and Shunpei leave with the youth, Kamen Rider Wizard defeats the Ghouls before turning his attention to Manticore in Land Style. However, faking a retreat, Manticore poisons Kamen Rider Wizard with his stinger before assuming his human form, predicting the wizard's slow and agonizing death. Elsewhere, not appreciating help from Haruto and focusing more on his ruined meal, the youth is treated to donuts. However, feeling that the donuts are not enough, the youth ditches Shunpei and Rinko as they learn of Haruto's condition and return to Omokagedō. With Red Garuda watching him from afar, the youth encounters Manticore, who gives him a free fortune to find his despair. The youth's upbeat personality and ideals confuse Manticore before Haruto and company arrive, forcing the Phantom to assume his true form. With the youth enjoying the turn of events and Haruto unable to transform due to the poison draining his mana, he introduces himself as Kosuke Nito while revealing himself to be the "ancient wizard Beast" and that he owns a Magic Ring. Once transformed, Kamen Rider Beast defeats the Ghouls and devours them for their magical power before donning the Chamelo Mantle to fight Manticore. Though inflicted with Manticore's poison, Kamen Rider Beast uses the Dolphi Mantle to wash the poison off of himself and Haruto before donning the Falco Mantle to finish the Phantom off and eat him. With Haruto wanting to confirm his Phantom consumption, Kamen Rider Beast instead thinks that Kamen Rider Wizard is also hunting Phantoms for their magical power and warns him not to meddle with his meals before leaving.
18	"Magical Power Eating"; Transliteration: "Maryoku ga Shokuji" (Japanese: 魔力が食事)	Satoshi Morota	Tsuyoshi Kida	January 13, 2013
After being kicked out of a Shinto shrine where he was setting camp, Nito notices a scuba diver emerging from the water and transform into the Phantom Hydra to attack a man named Hiroshi Oikawa. Delighting in a pitch chance and giving Oikawa time to escape, Nito is annoyed when Haruto arrives. As Nito finds him grabbed by a furious Hydra, Haruto transforms into Kamen Rider Wizard to save Nito along with Kamen Rider Beast. The Phantom flees, with Beast upset that Wizard once again meddled in his feeding affairs. Later, while treated to Mayonasse Donuts, Nito learns of the Gates and that Haruto does not need to feed on Phantoms. When Haruto asks how he became a wizard, Nito reveals that he was in college when he found a secret chamber in old ruins, where he found a seal. Removing a ring and buckle from the seal caused the seal to break as Ghouls emerged. Compelled by the voice, Nito used the ring and buckle and met the Phantom Chimera, who told him that they were in a pact that requires Nito to provide Beast Chimera with the magical energies of Phantoms to prolong his life. Nito learns of Haruto's reason to fight Phantoms, but stops him from revealing what becomes of the Gates if he fails to protect them. The next day, with Medusa formulating a plan to rectify the new turn of events, Hydra resurfaces to find Oikawa. While Haruto and Koyomi split up to cover ground in their search, she encounters a strange man who she identifies as a Phantom, who gives her a yellow Magic Stone meant for Haruto. Elsewhere, Nito is approached by Medusa, who claims that Haruto lied about not being after the Phantoms for their energy. Revealing that the despairing Gates are needed to procreate her kind, Medusa convinces Nito to kill Haruto in return for a new supply of Phantoms to prolong his life. Not knowing whom to believe, Kamen Rider Beast jumps into Kamen Rider Wizard's fight with Hydra and turns it into a three-way battle as he intends to give Oikawa to the highest bidder.
19	"Today's Life, Tomorrow's Life"; Transliteration: "Kyō no Inochi, Ashita no Inochi" (Japanese: 今日の命、明日の命)	Satoshi Morota	Tsuyoshi Kida	January 20, 2013
The three-way battle between Kamen Rider Wizard, Kamen Rider Beast, and the Phantom Hydra reaches a stalemate, and Nito flees with Oikawa. Back at the Omokagedō, Haruto explains the situation to the others while Wajima starts working on the Magic Stone brought by Koyomi. Unable to draw the Phantom from Oikawa by himself, Nito accompanies him to his home and notices a woman's painting in the wall. Nito learns from him that it is a portrait of his late wife that he painted, which is the only thing that keeps him going in life. They are joined by Haruto, Shunpei and Rinko, and Nito is saddened upon learning from Haruto that a Phantom is born at the expense of the Gate's existence. Despite his will to keep living, he does not want to do so by taking the lives of others. The next day, Haruto and his friends decide to take the painting to Omokagedō for safekeeping, but are attacked by Hydra and the Ghouls. They destroy the portrait, driving Oikawa into despair. Nito joins the fight and, to make amends for all the trouble he caused, dives into Oikawa's Underworld to destroy his inner Phantom, while Koyomi brings two new rings crafted by Wajima for Haruto. Watched from afar by the same Phantom who gave Koyomi the Magic Stone, Haruto uses the rings to transform into Kamen Rider Wizard Land Dragon and restrains Hydra with the Gravity Ring's magic before finishing him off the Special Ring as Nito mounts in the Beast Chimera to hunt down the inner Phantom. Despite being saved, Oikawa grieves over the lost portrait until Haruto shows him a letter from his wife addressed to him, which he found at the back of the frame. Knowing that her final wish was for him to keep painting, Oikawa finds the will to move on with his life. Haruto offers to destroy Nito's inner Phantom and save him from dying by mana depletion, but he refuses and leaves, claiming that they will meet again in the future.
20	"Learning the Truth"; Transliteration: "Chikazuku Shinshō" (Japanese: 近づく真相)	Hidenori Ishida	Junko Kōmura	January 27, 2013
On a stormy night, furious of Wiseman's refusal to have him deal with Kamen Rider Wizard for the time being, Phoenix takes his frustration on some drunks picking a fight with him before being found by Rinko. The next day, a young housewife named Shiho Arai is attacked by the Phantom Beelzebub and his Ghouls. However, Kamen Rider Wizard in his Hurricane Style intervenes while Shunpei gets her to safety. Finding that protecting the Gate is tougher than they thought, Haruto uses his Dress Up Ring to accompany her to her formal luncheon. However, at a dance class, Haruto finds Shiho being ignored, to her dismay. Even Shunpei shoves her aside after offering to be her friend, with Haruto realizing that everyone she has ties with is under Beelzebub's control. Confronting Beelzebub, who had Shiho's husband abandon her, Haruto transforms to fight the Phantom's Ghouls using the Excite Ring as Kamen Rider Beast joins the fight. However, Beelzebub reveals his ability to bend time-space and overpowers Wizard. Unaware that he is Phoenix, Rinko questions a flower shop owner who identifies the youth as Yugo Fujita, a quiet and diligent man who worked for him in the past before mysteriously disappearing six months ago during the solar eclipse. Realizing that the youth is a Phantom, Rinko investigates Yugo's apartment as Phoenix follows her before making his move.
21	"The Crazed Dance of the Dragons"; Transliteration: "Doragon-tachi no Ranbu" (Japanese: ドラゴンたちの乱舞)	Hidenori Ishida	Junko Kōmura	February 3, 2013
With Beelzebub's time-space bending putting him at a disadvantage, Kamen Rider Flame Dragon is defeated. He is saved by the Shiro Mahoutsukai, who takes him to a strange altar. Coming to, Haruto is told of a ritual to become stronger by drawing the full potential of his inner Phantom, which he accepts despite being warned of the risks. Enduring the pain, Haruto's gains a manifestation of his mana: the Drago Timer. Meanwhile, Phoenix takes Rinko into his original self's apartment and confirms that he is a Phantom, demanding to know why she is helping to thwart his kind. Liking her spunk when she answers that it is her duty as a police officer, Phoenix reveals Beelzebub's method of control through his familiars. Rushing back to Omokagedō, Rinko finds a frenzied Shunpei tied up and destroys the familiar to return him to normal. Rinko employs Shunpei, Koyomi, and Nito to take out Beelzebub's familiars. Returning to Phoenix to thank him for his help, not caring if he is a Phantom or not, Rinko asks him why he is suffering. Elsewhere, revealing that the familiars were nothing more than receivers for his energy, Beelzebub launches an attack with his controlled victims. Koyomi attempts to get Shiho to safety as Kamen Rider Beast loses against the Phantom. Haruto arrives and transforms to battle Beelzebub before assuming Flame Dragon form to summon the Drago Timer, which he uses to create manifestations of his Water Dragon, Hurricane Dragon, and Land Dragon forms. With his time-space abilities rendered ineffective, the Wizards finish Beelzebub off with their Dragon Four-Mation followed by a quadruple Slash Strike. As his victims are restored to normal, Phoenix reveals that he is not interested in causing despair. Inspired by Rinko's advice to do what he wants, Phoenix reveals his true form to a shocked Rinko as he thanks her before knocking her out.
22	"The Phoenix's Rampage"; Transliteration: "Fushichō no Bōsō" (Japanese: 不死鳥の暴走)	Shojiro Nakazawa	Tsuyoshi Kida	February 10, 2013
Upon revealing himself after Rinko advised him to do what he wants to rather than follow orders, Phoenix incinerates the area to release his rage. Rinko is saved from the flames by the mysterious youth, who gives him the idea to use the woman as bait so he can settle things with Kamen Rider Wizard. After hinting to Medusa on Phoenix's actions, the youth finds Shunpei as he was picking up replacement groceries and gives him a parcel containing Rinko's bloodied badge to deliver to Haruto at Hungry. Arriving to an abandoned factory and admitting that he does not like Wiseman's methods, the youth tells Phoenix to wait for Haruto. Some time later, Phoenix is confronted by Medusa, who demands what he thinks he is doing. With Medusa seeing that Phoenix is no longer following their mission, the two Phantoms battle. Though Medusa attempts to petrify him, her ability is negated as Phoenix lets her go to Wiseman and declares that he is now acting on his own. After learning about Rinko from Kizaki, Haruto encounters the youth, who introduces himself as Sora and tells him where Rinko is being held. Arriving as Phoenix thanks her for inspiring him to act on his own whims, Haruto and Phoenix assume their fighting forms to do battle. Phoenix has the advantage due to his immortality and increased regeneration as he uses his ultimate attack on Wizard.
23	"Deathmatch"; Transliteration: "Kessen" (Japanese: 決戦)	Shojiro Nakazawa	Tsuyoshi Kida	February 17, 2013
Haruto is driven into a corner by Phoenix's counterattack until Nito joins the fight, allowing him to flee with Rinko and take her for treatment. Nito tries to finish off Phoenix with the Chameleo Saber Strike, but he escapes after the Dice Saber produces a weak attack when the dice stops on one. With Rinko hospitalized and unconscious, Kizaki convinces Haruto that he must overcome his doubts before leaving. As Phoenix goes on a rampage in the city, Nito attacks him once more, but is stopped by a group of Ghouls. Phoenix warns him that he is waiting for Haruto for a decisive duel at the place they first fought before leaving. After defeating and absorbing the Ghouls, Nito returns to the Omokagedō, but the others ask him to not tell Haruto about the duel. Meanwhile, Rinko awakens and asks for Haruto's forgiveness as she feels guilty for trying to reason with Phoenix, which she believes worsened the situation. The following day, Nito awakens ready to face Phoenix in Haruto's place, but Haruto instead approaches him, revealing that Koyomi told him about the Phantom's challenge and convinces Nito to let him confront him by himself. As Haruto and Phoenix meet, Haruto claims that he will make Phoenix pay for making Rinko suffer and assumes Kamen Rider Wizard's Flame Dragon form to fight him. With the Drago Timer, Haruto also summons the other Dragon forms to assist him, but Phoenix proves too strong for them. In a last-ditch effort, Haruto uses the Drago Timer's Prism Drago Light to transform into Kamen Rider Wizard All Dragon and strike Phoenix with a Rider Kick that sends him to the sun, where he is trapped in an endless cycle of death and rebirth. Upon learning of Phoenix's defeat, Medusa now finds herself alone to do Wiseman's bidding, until Sora, who reveals himself as the Phantom Gremlin, appears to offer his help to her.
24	"The Wizard's Grandmother"; Transliteration: "Mahōtsukai no Sobo" (Japanese: 魔法使いの祖母)	Kenzo Maihara	Junko Kōmura	February 24, 2013
Assuming her true form when Gremlin assumes his, Medusa refuses upon learning that he arranged Phoenix's downfall with the intention of taking his place. Though Gremlin denies it, Medusa agrees to consider his proposal after he shows her some results first. Elsewhere, Nito reveals to Haruto and Shunpei that Rinko called him to meet her. He mistakes it for an invitation for a date, only to later realize that she brought his grandmother Toshie Nito, who intends to take him back to Fukui. Not wanting his grandmother to know about his predicament as Kamen Rider Beast, Nito runs off with Haruto and Rinko in pursuit, while Shunpei gives a saddened Toshie a tour of the city to cheer her up. Toshie is attacked by Weretiger, who recognizes her as a Gate, and Shunpei flees with her while calling Haruto and the others. Arriving at the location, Haruto transforms into Kamen Rider Wizard with Nito eventually becoming Kamen Rider Beast at a secluded location. Acting like a girl in order to deceive his grandma, Kamen Rider Beast fights Weretiger before retreating as Wizard joins the fray. Later, Toshie spends the night at Omokagedō while telling Shunpei her side of the story and being assured that he cares for her. Nito reveals to Haruto how his grandmother hounded him for his safety before he left for his exploration and asks Haruto to take her home in his place. The next day, after being paid a visit by Gremlin, Weretiger poses as a bus driver to capture Toshie. However, Nito was following his grandmother in disguise and is forced to reveal his identity as Kamen Rider Beast to her when he transforms. Kamen Rider Wizard intercepts the bus with the Machine Winger, assuming Water Style to fight as Beast uses the Chameleo Mantle. Though Weretiger had them end up with the other's ring, only Wizard can use the Dolphi Ring as Beast uses the Buffa Mantle instead. Upon hearing that her grandson needs to eat Phantoms to survive and that Phantoms are born from Gates thrown into despair, Toshie decides to offer herself to Weretiger without resistance before Shunpei takes a hit meant for her. Before Kamen Rider Wizard can reach him, Gremlin arrives and takes Shunpei hostage while telling the Kamen Riders he will inform them of a location where they can exchange their friend with Toshie.
25	"Life Choices"; Transliteration: "Inochi no Sentaku" (Japanese: 命の選択)	Kenzo Maihara	Junko Kōmura	March 3, 2013
Back at the Omokagedō, Toshie reveals to them that her intention to become a Phantom was so that Nito would consume her, as he needs the mana of Phantoms and Ghouls to survive. As he reprimands his grandmother for her drive to sacrifice herself for him, he remembers that he has hidden the Green Griffon in Shunpei's bag to follow him. Haruto and Rinko trace the Green Griffon to an abandoned bowling alley, but instead of Shunpei, they encounter Medusa. They realize that Gremlin had seen through Nito's plan and led them away from the place where Shunpei is being held by Weretiger, and Gremlin reveals the location for the exchange before fleeing. Meanwhile, Nito finally realizes that, despite her strictness, Toshie always cared for him, and reconciles with her. Medusa confronts Gremlin, angry at him for using her as a part of his schemes, but he claims that he was just intending to help. The time for the meeting comes, and, as asked, Nito brings Toshie and exchanges her for Shunpei after surrendering the Beast Driver to Gremlin and Weretiger. Gremlin then attacks Nito, realizing that Toshie's grandson is the source of her hope and destroying him would drive her into despair. However, they soon find that Nito is being protected by magic Haruto cast on him with the Falco Ring, and Haruto takes the opportunity to rescue Toshie and return the Beast Driver to him. Gremlin and Weretiger find themselves at a disadvantage in confronting two Kamen Riders. Gremlin flees after Kamen Rider Wizard weakens Weretiger with the Drago Timer and Kamen Rider Beast destroys him with a Kick Strike to consume it. Some time later, Nito sees his grandmother off as she leaves to return home.
26	"Campus Infiltration"; Transliteration: "Gakuen Sen'nyū" (Japanese: 学園潜入)	Satoshi Morota	Tsuyoshi Kida	March 10, 2013
As Haruto obtains a new Plamonster, the shy Violet Golem, Nito sees a young woman who resembles Medusa and follows her before realizing that she walked into a high school. In his search for the girl, Nito ends up causing a disturbance before finding Medusa attacking a trio of school girls. Intercepting her, Nito transforms into Kamen Rider Beast and fights Medusa before she defeats him and leaves. Nito eventually finds "Medusa" and grabs her, but in the process accidentally knocks over a police officer and is arrested as Haruto and Shunpei see the mysterious girl. As Nito tries to get Rinko to bail him out of jail as she investigates the student, Haruto and Shunpei pose as students to follow the girl and learn from the three girls Medusa attacked that her name is Mayu Inamori. As Rinko finds a startling fact during her research on the girl, Haruto feels there is something amiss with Mayu before Medusa appears and goes after Mayu's friend Takako. Seeing Mayu, Medusa assumes her human form, who Mayu recognizes as her older twin sister Misa Inamori. Seeing her original self's twin, Medusa attacks Haruto as he becomes Kamen Rider Wizard while Shunpei gets Takako to safety. Assuming Flame Dragon so his Drago Timer clones can hold off the Ghouls, Wizard battles Medusa as Kamen Rider Beast arrives and consumes the grunts. As the Kamen Riders fight Medusa, Gremlin delights in the turn of events as Mayu watches on, in disbelief that her sister has become a monster.
27	"Big and Little Sisters"; Transliteration: "Ane to Imōto" (Japanese: 姉と妹)	Satoshi Morota	Tsuyoshi Kida	March 17, 2013
Overpowering Kamen Riders Wizard and Beast, Medusa turns her attention to Mayu and assumes her original self's form before leaving, with Rinko holding back Mayu from following her. Later, as Nito and Shunpei take Takako to her home to keep an eye on her, Mayu is taken to Omokagedō to cope with the new turn of events. The next day, as Mayu receives a text message and leaves in secret, Haruto is informed that Gremlin has appeared to attack Takako. By the time Kamen Rider Wizard arrives to put the Phantom at a disadvantage with Kamen Rider Beast, Gremlin reveals that Mayu is a Gate and that Medusa has lured her to the house her family lived in. As Wizard Hurricane Dragon and Rinko approach, Mayu is fooled into believing that Medusa is Misa as the Phantom tricks her into giving her the keepsake and reveals that seeing their family again gives her hope. Having what she needs, Medusa explains that the real Misa has long since died and that she murdered Mayu's parents before smashing the keepsake to begin the birth of Mayu's Phantom. Wizard and Rinko arrive too late and, with Medusa keeping Haruto from interfering by siphoning his magic, it seems that Mayu's Phantom is about to manifest. However, remembering Misa's words that only she decides how it starts and ends, Mayu suppresses her Phantom, to Medusa's shock, as the White Wizard appears and drives her off. The White Wizard turns his attention to Mayu, offering her the chance to take revenge for her family as his apprentice, giving her a new beginning as a witch.
28	"The Stolen Belt"; Transliteration: "Nusumareta Beruto" (Japanese: 盗まれたベルト)	Shojiro Nakazawa	Junko Kōmura	March 24, 2013
Archeologist Osamu Nakamoto discovers in ancient ruins a Wizard Ring similar to those used by Kamen Rider Beast and a strange rock. Meanwhile, at the Omokagedō, Haruto and the others learn that Takako was sent to her family overseas for her safety and that there has not been news about Mayu since she disappeared with the White Wizard. Violet Golem is still refusing to leave the shop and prefers to stay with Wajima, helping with his work. Meanwhile, Nito, in anguish at not having consumed a Phantom recently, learns about Nakamoto's discovery from a newspaper at the Donut Shop and leaves to meet him, but finds him under attack by the Phantom Spriggan. Haruto and Nito drive Spriggan off, and both Nito and Nakamoto find themselves mesmerized by each other's relics. In the end, Nakamoto agrees to let Nito examine the ring he found once he researches his Beast Driver. Haruto then returns to the shop, sure that Nakamoto will be safe in Nito's company, and finds that Violet Golem helped Wajima craft a storage box for the Wizard Rings, which he also uses to hide himself. Rinko informs him that Nakamoto is not held in esteem by his peers, always assigned to menial tasks, and that he may have found in Nito's relics the chance he was waiting for to make a breakthrough in his career. Meanwhile, Spriggan suggests to Medusa that they focus their efforts on destroying the Wizards to have them stop interfering their plans. However, she claims that they instead must follow Wiseman's orders to help him hold the Sabbath once more. The next day, Nito awakens to find that his Beast Driver and Wizard Rings are missing as Spriggan and Gremlin launch an attack on them. Unable to transform into Kamen Rider Beast, Nito finds himself powerless while Haruto tries to protect Nakamoto from two Phantoms at once.
29	"The Evolving Wild Beast"; Transliteration: "Shinka Suru Yajū" (Japanese: 進化する野獣)	Shojiro Nakazawa	Junko Kōmura	March 31, 2013
Outnumbered by the enemies, Kamen Rider Wizard uses the Drago Timer to overwhelm the Phantoms while getting Nakamoto to safety. At Omokagedō, Nito frets over losing his belt, as it is the only way to feed Beast Chimera. After Haruto's attempt to use the Please Ring fails, Rinko talks Nakamoto into letting her investigate his study for clues regarding the belt's whereabouts. With Rinko and Haruto getting suspicious of Nakamoto running them around and remembering his need for acknowledgement, they reveal to Nito that Nakamoto is the one who stole the Beast Driver from Nito. When Nito confronts Nakamoto about it, he denies having it and drives everyone away from his room. Sending Shunpei to get him a replica of the Beast Driver that the Violet Golem has created, the gang tricks Nakamoto into exposing where he has hidden it. Nakamoto then confesses that he was tired of being forced to have the merits of his findings stolen by his superior and wants to be recognized by any means necessary. While calming Rinko down, Nito suddenly collapses as he realizes that the Beast Chimera is beginning to eat his spiritual essence away. Refusing to accept Haruto's help, Nito explains that he wants to know everything about the Phantom they are fighting and his abilities, even if it kills him. Having been told by Gremlin that Nakamoto's findings are his hope, Spriggan arrives, with Haruto grabbing the false driver to draw the Phantom away. As Haruto uses the Fall Ring before transforming to fight Spriggan, Nito reclaims his arsenal, with Nakamoto giving him the relics. Arriving just as Spriggan gets the upper hand against Kamen Rider Wizard, Nito transforms into Kamen Rider Beast, but is still too weak to fight the Ghouls until he decides to use the Hyper Ring. Within his Underworld, Nito meets Beast Chimera, who reveals the other sealed artifact would manifest his power in the physical world but believes Nito lacks the ability to use it. Nito convinces the Phantom to give him his power, resulting in Kamen Rider Beast's evolution into Kamen Rider Beast Hyper, while the other relic transforms into the Mirage Magnum gun. After consuming the Ghouls, Kamen Rider Beast Hyper overwhelms Spriggan before using the Mirage Magnum to finish the Phantom off with the Shooting Mirage finisher. He consumes the Phantom's magical essence while Gremlin watches from afar. Later, as Nito and the others see Nakamoto off as he leaves the country, finally realizing that finding what mysteries the world holds is more important than the fame they give him, Gremlin visits a chained Phantom he calls Naito with the intention of releasing him.
30	"The Day Magic Disappeared"; Transliteration: "Mahō no Kieru Hi" (Japanese: 魔法の消える日)	Takayuki Shibasaki	Tsuyoshi Kida	April 7, 2013
Entering a cave in the middle of the forest, Gremlin releases a Phantom he calls Naito but who prefers to be called by his true name: Legion. Learning of his escape, Wiseman sends Medusa to find Legion as he begins attacking people without discrimination. The next day, at the doughnut shop, Rinko is being run ragged by a series of coma victims, while Haruto uses his magic to help after he and Shunpei notice a youth named Kenta trying to cheer up his younger sister Shiori. Elsewhere, Nito confronts Legion, as he attacked what the magician learned is a normal human. Nito transforms into Kamen Rider Beast to devour the Phantom but finds himself overpowered, and becomes Kamen Rider Beast Hyper to even the odds. Finding the Kamen Rider not to his liking, Legion summons a group of Ghouls to hold off Beast Hyper as he leaves. After being alerted by Rinko, Haruto and Shunpei leave the children to meet up with her as Nito reveals the Phantom to be behind the attacks. Later finding Kenta buying a flower bouquet, Haruto and Shunpei encounter Legion as he deems Kenta of interest. Fighting Legion while Shunpei takes Kenta to safety, Haruto transforms into Kamen Rider Wizard as the Phantom deems him a more worthy target. Even with Kamen Rider Beast joining the fray, Legion is too powerful for the Kamen Riders as the Phantom enters Haruto's Underworld. Inside Haruto's body, Legion destroys him from the inside as Kamen Rider Beast is forced to use his Engage Ring to stop the Phantom with Beast Chimera. When WizarDragon joins the fray, Legion destroys the inner Phantom, with Haruto now rendered powerless. Elsewhere, revealing to Medusa that he freed Legion to get his attention, Gremlin is restrained by Wiseman, who intends to kill him for interfering with his plans. However, Wiseman stays his hand when Gremlin mentions wanting to know more about his goals, which include the Philosopher's Stone.
31	"Tears"; Transliteration: "Namida" (Japanese: 涙)	Takayuki Shibasaki	Tsuyoshi Kida	April 14, 2013
With WizarDragon destroyed, Haruto loses his magical powers as Legion flees. With Shunpei's help, Nito takes him back to the Omokagedō to rest and, after explaining the situation to the others, leaves to confront Legion by himself. Meanwhile, Wiseman asks Gremlin about his interest in the Philosopher's Stone, but he tells him that he shares the same goals as him. Legion attacks innocents, but no longer finds satisfaction in it, as he failed to destroy Haruto's mind completely and decides to look for him. After Nito asks him to leave Legion to his care, Haruto is approached by Kenta and Shiori, who ask him to perform magic for them again, but he reveals to them that he lost his powers. Kenta then reveals that he was learning magic tricks to cheer up his sister, who is about to undergo surgery, and, to them, Haruto's kindness was more important than his magic. Back at the shop, Haruto finds Koyomi's Please Ring abandoned and realizes that she is missing. Knowing that without his magic, Koyomi will soon run out of mana and perish, Haruto looks for her. Nito finds and confronts Legion, but, even after transforming into Kamen Rider Beast Hyper, ends up restrained by the Phantom. Legion resumes his search for Haruto, who finds Koyomi where they first met after the night of the eclipse. Koyomi mentions how he encouraged her at that time, and thanks him for giving her a reason to keep living to the end. When Legion finds them, Haruto is beaten up until Koyomi runs out of mana and collapses. As Haruto starts crying for her, he claims that he will never give up and his powers return, creating the Infinity Ring with his tears. When Haruto equips the WizarDriver, WizarDragon appears before him, revealing that his determination is what brought him back to life and offers his help once more. Haruto then uses the ring to transform into Kamen Rider Wizard Infinity Style and summons WizarDragon in the form of his new weapon, the Axcalibur. Legion unsuccessfully tries to enter Haruto's mind again, and, after weakening the enemy, Wizard finishes him off with the Axcalibur's Shining Strike. Watched by White Wizard from afar, Haruto revives Koyomi and rejoices with Nito and the others. Weeks later, it is revealed that Shiori's surgery was successful, while Medusa is informed by Wiseman, much to her surprise, that from now on she will work under Gremlin's orders.
32	"Part-Time Danger"; Transliteration: "Kiken na Arubaito" (Japanese: 危険なアルバイト)	Hidenori Ishida	Daisuke Ishibashi	April 21, 2013
Nito encounters his high school friend Masataka Tsuchiya. who is now living in Tokyo in a run down shack, as he spends all the money he earns to expand his collection of guitars. Elsewhere, Haruto defeats Ghouls attacking people, but fails to figure out who could be a Gate. Gremlin reminds Medusa, who watches the situation from afar, that she is now working under him and drags her away to take part in his new plan. Tsuchiya learns of a job offer that promises to pay ¥1 million for each day of work and Nito joins him on the interview. However, upon learning about it from Shunpei, Haruto and Koyomi become suspicious. At the job interview, which is held by a gloomy man dressed in black, Tsuchiya and Nito, among other candidates, are watched by Medusa and Gremlin from another room and, some time later, Tsuchiya is informed that he passed. The following day, Tsuchiya, along with two other newly hired colleagues, spend their first day of work with nothing to do, but get paid as promised. Some time later, three other co-workers join them, but Haruto, who has been watching from afar with Nito and Rinko, recognizes one of them as among those he saved from the Ghouls. Upon suspecting the Phantoms' involvement, Haruto and Nito infiltrate the building with the Small and Chameleo Rings, but the Gates are nowhere to found. When they confront Misa, she reveals that the people were taken somewhere else. Nito then remembers that Tsuchiya had told him that they would soon be sent to Yokohama to take part in a special training exercise with the promise of having their salary increased tenfold. Haruto and Nito arrive in Yokohama as the interviewer, who reveals himself to be the Phantom Bogy, is attacking the prospective Gates. To protect Tsuchiya and the others, Kamen Riders Wizard and Beast Hyper fight Bogy, whose ghostly body prevents him from being harmed, until Kamen Rider Wizard transforms into the Infinity Style and seemingly finishes Bogy with the Axcalibur's Shining Strike. However, he is unaware that some of the Phantom's essence has been transferred to the Gates' bodies, with Gremlin claiming that Bogy's job has just started. Tsuchiya then decides to leave Tokyo for his own safety, presenting Nito with a charm before departing with instructions to stay away from the city.
33	"What Money Can't Buy"; Transliteration: "Kane de Kaenai Mono" (Japanese: 金で買えないモノ)	Hidenori Ishida	Daisuke Ishibashi	April 28, 2013
While Haruto and the others believe that the Gates are now safe from danger, Tsuchiya, while leaving Tokyo, finds a free gas ticket that can only be used in the city, drawing him back. While seeing that one of the other Gates is on TV and learning that he still has not left, Haruto and Shunpei go to find him. Nito discovers that Tsuchiya has returned and insists that he must leave, but Tsuchiya finds himself experiencing fortunate events that delay his departure, with the same happening to the Gate being watched by Haruto and Shunpei. After managing to gather a huge sum of money by luck, the Gate is soon robbed of his money and his luck takes a turn for the worse. Haruto realizes that something is wrong and uses the Light Ring to reveal that he was being haunted by Bogy's ghost. Struggling to fight the ghost due to its ability to manipulate luck, Haruto finishes it off, only for Gremlin to reveal his plan to have the haunted Gates fall into despair by giving them a lucky streak, just to have them lose it all soon after. Haruto contacts Nito about Gremlin's revelation, and leaves Tsuchiya in his care while he uses the Drago Timer to reach the other four Gates at once. Nito reveals the truth to Tsuchiya, but he refuses to believe that it is all the Phantom's work. Instead of listening to him, he pays some men to beat him up before leaving him behind, claiming that he does not consider Nito a friend anymore. Some time later, Tsuchiya takes the men for a ride in an expensive car, only for them to abandon him following an accident that leaves him trapped in the car. However, Nito arrives to save him and Tsuchiya comes to his senses, asking Nito to get rid of the ghost haunting him. Nito then confronts Bogy and finishes it off with Kamen Rider Beast Hyper's Shooting Mirage, while Kamen Rider Wizard defeats the other ghosts with the Flame, Water, Wind, and Land Dragons' Rider Kicks. Tsuchiya reconciles with Nito, vowing to never forget about their friendship again.
34	"The Other Side of a Popular Model"; Transliteration: "Ninki Moderu no Uragawa" (Japanese: 人気モデルの裏側)	Kenzo Maihara	Tsuyoshi Kida	May 5, 2013
Rinko and Haruto are called by Kizaki and learn that Gremlin was the one who give Section Zero the green Magic Stone. Learning of Gremlin's original self as Sora Takigawa, the pair are sent to investigate his place of work. From what he got from Sora's former employer, Haruto realizes that Gremlin has the same personality as his original self compared to other Phantoms. Nito transforms into Kamen Rider Beast to fight the Phantom Argus while Shunpei gets the Gate that Argus is targeting to safety. After Argus escapes, Nito and Shunpei learn of Chiaki Shimizu, a young woman and rising fashion model. With Chiaki being targeted by the Phantoms, yet wanting to work despite the danger, Shunpei and Nito offer themselves as bodyguards to protect her. In the process, they find Chiaki to be only focused on her work, with no consideration for anything else, before she flees when the photographer was running late. Elsewhere, Haruto and Rinko find Gremlin and learn that the Phantom is still Sora in mind and compares himself to the magician as they are unique cases. After Sora leaves, Haruto is conflicted if the Phantom's words are true before getting a call from Shunpei that Chiaki is missing. While Rinko goes to learn more on Sora's missing customers, Haruto meets up with Kamen Rider Beast to protect Chiaki from Argus before the Phantom summons Ghoul reinforcements to hold them at bay. However, watching the fight from afar, Sora intervenes to protect Chiaki before getting knocked into the lake. Leaving Beast to get Chiaki to safety, Wizard assumes Water Style to dive after Sora.
35	"The Other Side of Sora"; Transliteration: "Sora no Mukōgawa" (Japanese: 空の向こう側)	Kenzo Maihara	Tsuyoshi Kida	May 12, 2013
After saving Sora, Haruto helps the Phantom search for his lost hat. During the search, wanting answers, Haruto learns that the Phantoms' goal to start another Sabbath, to his horror. After telling Sora that he and Koyomi are still human despite the comparisons, Haruto learns from Sora that a human remaining in one piece after spawning a Phantom is unlikely. The next day, Chiaki's photo shoot is interrupted by Argus before Kamen Rider Beast comes to her aid. In the confusion, Sora takes Chiaki to his abode. While searching for her, Nito learns that Chiaki seeks to reunite with her father after he left following her mother's death. Elsewhere, Haruto arrives to Sora's apartment before he gets a call from Rinko to meet her at Section Zero. Once there, he learns that Sora was a murderer before the Sabbath and that he only saved Chiaki so he can kill her personally. Ipon revealing why he became a murderer, Sora starts ruining Chiaki's hair as he plans to kill her by spawning a Phantom from her. However, Haruto and Nito appear to stop him. Nito gets Chiaki to safety, becoming Kamen Rider Beast Hyper to destroy Argus. Upstairs, upon telling Sora they could never be friends, Haruto transforms into Kamen Rider Wizard while Sora assumes his Phantom form. Kamen Rider Wizard Infinity Style overpowers Gremlin before he falls back, promising to settle things once he obtains the Philosopher's Stone. Some time later, with a new short haircut, Chiaki receives an encouraging letter from her father and is fine with being acknowledged. Elsewhere, though Rinko assures him not to let his past mistakes bother him, Haruto is still bothered by both the Phantoms' goal and Sora's words regarding Koyomi.
36	"The Myna Bird Speaks"; Transliteration: "Kyūkanchō wa Kataru" (Japanese: 九官鳥は語る)	Satoshi Morota	Daisuke Ishibashi	May 19, 2013
While discussing with Wajima about Sora's words regarding Koyomi, the Sabbath and the Philosopher's Stone, Haruto realizes that he still knows little about the Phantoms or their intentions. Remembering the day he got lost in a forest with her, he decides to return there and look for clues. Meanwhile, Rinko is searching for a suspect of arson when she meets Shunpei. She sees the man while talking to him about it, but loses his trail after she bumps into Shunpei, causing a commotion. Upon learning about it, Rinko's chief in the police threatens to fire her if she does not apprehend the suspect. Haruto, while searching through the forest, realizes that he is walking in circles because of the effects of a magic barrier, and assumes Kamen Rider Wizard's Infinity Style to break it and find Wiseman's hideout. Haruto confronts Wiseman, but instead of answering his questions, he drains his mana and uses it to restore the barrier, driving him away. Back at the Omokagedō, Rinko blames Shunpei for her career being in jeopardy and he decides to look for the man by himself. Rinko also appears in pursuit of the suspect, and Haruto restrains him with the Bind Ring. However, a Phantom appears and breaks the fugitive free, fighting Haruto as he flees again, leaving his caged myna bird behind, and it is revealed that the runaway is actually a Gate. Rinko and Shunpei argue about the next course of action, with Rinko intending to arrest the man, and Shunpei claiming that they must protect him from the Phantoms instead. Haruto leaves them to look for the Gate by himself, meeting Nito along the way. He asks for his assistance while the myna bird, who usually only utters the word "despair", surprises Rinko and Shunpei when it starts repeating an address, leading them to the Gate's apartment. They learn that his name is Kazuyoshi Nemoto, but he is nowhere to be found. The bird then tells about other places where Nemoto could be until they find him. Instead of answering their questions, Nemoto is happy to meet his bird again. They are later found by Haruto and Nito, but the bird reveals itself as the Phantom Raum and attacks them. Gremlin appears before them and reveals that Raum has the ability to transform itself into a bird, and now branded as a suspect of arson, the unstable Nemoto may fall into despair upon being arrested. Haruto wants to question Gremlin further, but he refuses, sending some Ghouls to assist Raum instead. As policemen appear to arrest Nemoto, Raum and Gremlin flee and Haruto decides to use the Drago Timer to help him, but collapses after running out of mana. While Nito finishes off the Ghouls to protect Haruto, Shunpei steals a police car to help Nemoto escape. Rinko tries to stop him, only to be taken along as the policemen report that both Rinko and Shunpei are escaping with the suspect.
37	"Wanted: Despair"; Transliteration: "Zetsubō, Shimei Tehai" (Japanese: 絶望、指名手配)	Satoshi Morota	Daisuke Ishibashi	May 26, 2013
While Haruto rests at Omokagedō to recover his mana, Shunpei flees, taking Nemoto and Rinko in a police car, and an arrest warrant is issued for them. Rinko tries to warn the police, but Shunpei throws her cellphone away, and with his own phone forgotten at the shop, the others cannot contact them. Taking shelter in a junkyard, Nemoto insists that he is not an arsonist, but is too afraid to confront the police despite being innocent. Rinko starts believing in his story while Gremlin reminds Raum about the consequences should he fail his mission, and the Phantom draws the police to Nemoto's location. As Shunpei and the others escape through the sewers, Haruto's Red Garuda and Nito's Green Griffon find Raum and fuse to fight him, giving enough time for Haruto and Nito to reach the enemy. However, it flees upon finding itself in a disadvantage. Rinko confronts Nemoto, reminding him that there are some things that only he can do for himself, and Shunpei agrees with her. Nemoto then remembers that there was a second security camera at the scene of the arson, and Rinko manages to obtain the data from it, while Raum, disguised as the myna bird, reunites with Nemoto. The next day, Rinko and Shunpei bring Nemoto to the police, claiming that they have the criminal in their custody. Haruto and Nito arrive, trying to dissuade them, and Nemoto believes that he was betrayed until Rinko reveals that the data they obtained shows that the real culprit is Raum. Raum then reveals his true form and flees, but Haruto and Nito catch up to him. With Kamen Rider Beast's help, Kamen Rider Wizard transforms into Infinity Style and uses the Shining Strike to defeat both Raum and the Ghouls. Rinko and Shunpei apologize to Nemoto for not revealing their plan to him, as they could not have Raum become suspicious of them. However, instead of being relieved upon being cleared of the charges against him, Nemoto falls into despair at the loss of his bird and starts turning into a Phantom.
38	"Stolen Hope"; Transliteration: "Ubatta Kibō" (Japanese: 奪った希望)	Hidenori Ishida	Tsuyoshi Kida	June 2, 2013
Sora complains with Wiseman about how their efforts to create more Phantoms have been thwarted by Haruto and Nito. Wiseman insists that to obtain the Philosopher's Stone, a huge quantity of mana must be gathered to perform the Sabbath without the need of a solar eclipse, and Gremlin wonders if there is another way, unlike what he claims. Meanwhile, aspiring soccer player Kazuya Shinozaki is training with his girlfriend Naomi to participate in an upcoming selection, but is forced to stop upon feeling pain on his knee. They are attacked by the Phantom Bahamut and Haruto and Shunpei appear to assist them, but the Phantom retreats after repelling Haruto's attacks. Haruto recognizes Kazuya, and it is revealed that he is his friend and was a soccer player like him. However, Kazuya rejects Haruto's offer to protect him and Nito agrees to do so in his place. Kazuya confesses to Nito and Rinko that, during a selection one year before, an accident involving him and Haruto resulted in Kazuya's knee being injured. He cannot forgive Haruto, not for his injury, but for quitting soccer, as he wanted his friend to move forward in his place. Haruto, watching over them from afar, confesses to Rinko that he quit because he could not forgive himself for what happened with Kazuya. Kazuya decides to keep training despite the risks and, while overhearing his talk with Naomi, Bahamut appears and attempts to drive him into despair, but Nito intervenes to protect him. Bahamut overpowers Nito, who buys enough time for Haruto to join the battle. However, Haruto fails to take him down with the Drago Timer and Bahamut starts beating him up until Kazuya kicks balls at it to make him stop. In response, the Phantom launches a powerful attack at him and Haruto intervenes to protect his friend. Meanwhile, a well-dressed man enters the Omokagedō, and, as Wajima recognizes him, he shows him a magic stone and asks him to create a magic ring with it.
39	"What Was Forgotten on the Pitch"; Transliteration: "Pitchi no Wasuremono" (Japanese: ピッチの忘れ物)	Hidenori Ishida	Tsuyoshi Kida	June 9, 2013
Assisted by Nito, Haruto manages to hold back Bahamut long enough to escape with everyone. Meanwhile, Wajima refuses to make a ring for the mysterious man, claiming that it was his fault that Haruto and Koyomi got involved in the fight against the Phantoms. However, the man insists that by making the ring he will also help Haruto, and introduces himself as Fueki before leaving. With his arm injured, Kazuya is hospitalized again and Naomi blames Haruto for it, as he was risking himself to protect him, and Haruto asks for another chance to properly help him this time. Later that night, Bahamut breaks into Kazuya's room to find Haruto waiting there for him. Haruto and Nito team up manage to drive Bahamut away. The next morning, Wajima is sleeping after working to complete the new ring and Golem, believing that it is made for Haruto's use, takes it away. When Wajima awakens, Fueki is waiting for him and, while attempting to figure out what has happened, leaves after the Black Cerberus Plamonster warns him. Meanwhile, Kazuya is missing, and after Nito shows Haruto a photo of himself and Kazuya, Haruto figures out where he is. Haruto finds Kazuya at the local stadium and, while being questioned by him if he will ever play soccer again, Haruto replies that his current dream is to protect everyone's hopes as a wizard. At Kazuya's request, Haruto plays with him one last time and they reconcile as Bahamut appears before them. Luring the Phantom away from the stadium, Haruto finishes it off for good with Kamen Rider Wizard Infinity Style's Shining Strike. Soon after, Violet Golem finds Haruto and gives him the ring, but much to his surprise, it does not work with his WizarDriver. Black Cerberus takes the ring and gives it to Fueki, who claims that the ring was made for him and reveals himself as the White Wizard. Before leaving, Fueki warns Haruto to prepare himself, as the "day of reckoning" is approaching.
40	"I Want to Ride a Bike"; Transliteration: "Jitensha ni Noritai" (Japanese: 自転車に乗りたい)	Kenzo Maihara	Junko Kōmura	June 23, 2013
Wajima apologizes to Haruto and Koyomi for keeping Fueki secret from them. To learn more about Fueki's intentions, Haruto asks for Rinko's help to look for him. Meanwhile, Nito meets Shunpei as a child is attacked by the Phantom Sylphi and borrows his bike to reach him. The boy watches in awe as Kamen Rider Beast makes use of his bike skills to defeat the Ghouls and, after Haruto joins the fray, Sylphi retreats. Introducing himself as Yuzuru Iijima, he asks Nito to teach him how to ride a bike, revealing that he intends to do so to make amends with his friend Akari Kurata. He started avoiding her after getting into trouble while riding her bike despite being unable to. However, as Akari will move to another city the next week, he must learn before that. Nito agrees and trains Yuzuru while Haruto and Rinko ask for Kizaki's help in looking for Fueki. However, Sylphi overhears the conversation from afar with his wind powers and makes use of his winds to assist with Yuzuru's training. After spending the night assembling a composite picture of Fueki with Rinko, Haruto decides to check up on Nito while Yuzuru makes a demonstration of his bike skills to Akari and apologizes to her. However, Sylphi uses his powers to create an accident, throwing Yuzuru's bike at Akari and knocking her unconscious. Sylphi reveals to a griefstruck Yuzuru that he used his winds to assist him and blames the boy for what happened as he loses hope and starts turning into a Phantom. Haruto's way to them is blocked by Medusa, who drains his mana and gains the upper hand until Mayu appears to help him, transforming into a Kamen Rider to confront the creature that her sister became.
41	"The Wizard Fate"; Transliteration: "Mahōtsukai wa Unmei" (Japanese: 魔法使いは運命)	Kenzo Maihara	Junko Kōmura	June 30, 2013
After transforming into Kamen Rider Mage, Mayu helps Haruto against Medusa, who is forced to flee. Yuzuru is about to transform into a Phantom until he hears unconscious Akari calling his name and manages to keep his inner Phantom at bay. Sylphi tries to flee, taking Akari and Yuzuru with him, but Kamen Rider Beast interferes and he ends up escaping with Akari in his custody. Yuzuru is brought to the Omokagedō, where Mayu asks him if he would like to become a wizard as well, but both Haruto and Nito say he should not. Soon after, Sylphi sends a message to them, telling them where he is holding Akari hostage. Kizaki, seeing Fueki's profile by Haruto, realizes that he has seen the man before and learns of his identity before he is mysteriously attacked. Haruto, Nito, and Yuzuru meet Sylphi and Akari at a construction site, and Sylphi attempts to kill her to drive Yuzuru into despair. However, Mayu uses her Gravity Ring to save Akari and Shunpei intervenes to rescue her. Medusa tries to intervene, but Gremlin stops her. Sylphi tries to flee, but is stopped by Haruto and Nito, who finish him off with Kamen Rider Wizard Infinity Style's Shining Strike and Kamen Rider Beast Hyper's Shooting Mirage. Some time later, Yuzuru rejects Mayu's offer to become a wizard; after she leaves, Haruto is called by a distraught Rinko. Meanwhile, Nito is about to use his Engage Ring to destroy Yuzuru's inner Phantom when the White Wizard appears to stop him. Despite Nito's efforts to protect Yuzuru, he is kidnapped by Fueki, who claims that becoming a wizard is a fate Yuzuru cannot avoid, with Gremlin watching the scene from afar. Meanwhile, Haruto meets Rinko at Section Zero to find Kizaki's office destroyed and learns that he is missing.
42	"The Ringed Novelist"; Transliteration: "Yubiwa no Shōsetsuka" (Japanese: 指輪の小説家)	Satoshi Morota	Tsuyoshi Kida	July 7, 2013
As Kizaki's room is isolated by the forensics team, Haruto and the others learn from Nito about Yuzuru's kidnapping. Meanwhile, Medusa asks Gremlin why he stopped her from killing Yuzuru, and he claims that he had things for him to confirm. Meanwhile, Haruto replenishes Koyomi's mana and points out that her body is consuming mana at a faster rate than normal. Some time later, author Masafumi Saionji holds an autograph session for his latest bestseller when he is approached by the Phantom Sphinx, and Haruto appears with Shunpei to help him. After the Phantom is driven away, Saionji is taken to his home, where he finds that he has lost the ring he was carrying with him. According to Saionji, he was suffering from writer's block until he met a child who encouraged him and inspired him to write his last book. Since then, he has been looking for her to return the ring she lost that day, but has not found her. Meanwhile, as Rinko is informed by her boss that Kizaki asked him for her to be transferred to Section Zero, Nito finds Mayu and informs her that Yuzuru has been kidnapped by the White Wizard. However, she claims that despite wanting to help Nito find the boy, she does not know where he could have taken him. As Haruto and Shunpei are distracted, Saionji escapes to look for the ring and finds it in possession of Sphinx. Just as the Phantom is about to destroy the ring to drive the Gate into despair, the Red Garuda appears to take it and Haruto confronts Sphinx as Kamen Rider Wizard. Meanwhile, Rinko meets Nito and Mayu and the three are approached by Gremlin, who claims to know where the White Wizard is hidden. Despite knowing it may be a trap, Nito decides to hear what the Phantom has to say. After rescuing Saionji, Haruto takes him to the Omokagedō, where he meets Koyomi and recognizes her as the girl he has been looking for.
43	"The White Wizard's Secret"; Transliteration: "Shiroi Mahōtsukai no Himitsu" (Japanese: 白い魔法使いの秘密)	Satoshi Morota	Tsuyoshi Kida	July 14, 2013
Saionji tries to have Koyomi remember him, but she cannot due to her memories being lost. As Saionji learns about Koyomi's situation, Nito, Rinko, and Mayu reach the place mentioned by Gremlin, where they find Fueki, who claims that he has convinced Yuzuru to become a wizard, but Nito does not believe him. Transforming into Kamen Rider Beast Hyper, he demands Fueki to return Yuzuru and, despite fighting the White Wizard with full power, he is overpowered until Mayu intervenes. As Fueki flees, Rinko finds an unconscious Kizaki and they take him to the hospital. Haruto is informed about Kizaki's condition and heads to the hospital as well, while Wajima watches over Saionji and Koyomi. However, Koyomi asks Saionji to take her to the place where they first met in an attempt to recover some of her memories, and they leave without informing the others. At the hospital, Haruto is informed by the others that Kizaki may never wake up, and they begin to wonder if Fueki is really an ally after he put so much effort into silencing the detective. Shunpei sees Koyomi and Saionji passing by him unprotected and informs Haruto about it, but Sphinx tails them as well. Upon reaching the lake where they first met, Saionji tries to help Koyomi remember how she encouraged him at the time. However, as he tries to return her lost ring, Sphinx appears to snatch and destroy it, driving the writer into despair. Haruto, Nito, and Shunpei appear and, while Haruto dives into Saionji's Underworld, Kamen Rider Beast Hyper finishes off Sphinx. After Kamen Rider Wizard All Dragon defeats Saionji's inner Phantom, he watches Saionji's memories of Koyomi and learns that Fueki is her father. As Koyomi thanks Saionji for encouraging her, just like she once did for him, Haruto wonders about what he had just discovered. Fueki watches from afar, claiming that he needs only one more wizard to complete his plan for the sake of his daughter.
44	"The Son's Keepsake"; Transliteration: "Musuko no Katami wa" (Japanese: 息子の形見は)	Hidenori Ishida	Junko Kōmura	July 21, 2013
With his recent discovery about Fueki and Koyomi in mind, Haruto leaves for patrol as a guest arrives at the Omokagedō. The man recognizes Haruto and reveals himself as his former teacher, Yoshikazu Kumagai. Kumagai reveals to Haruto at the Donut Shop Hungry that he is looking for a toy plane which belonged to his late son. He had heard that the plane was at the Omokagedō, but, according to Wajima, he had sold it a month ago. Koyomi appears soon after and alerts them that the woman sitting at a nearby table is a Phantom. Introducing herself as Siren, the Phantom is confronted by Haruto and, after it flees, Koyomi suddenly runs out of mana and collapses. After Haruto replenishes Koyomi's mana, he leaves with Kumagai to look for the toy, unaware of a strange wound appearing on her hand. Meanwhile, Nito arrives at Yuzuru's house with the intention of explaining his kidnapping to his family. However, he sees Rinko leaving and learns from her that the police had already informed them about the situation, but left out the details regarding the White Wizard for their sake. Elsewhere, Medusa inquires Wiseman about his reasons for letting Gremlin do as he pleases, and he replies that Gremlin aims to obtain the Philosopher's Stone. He reveals that he is using him to accomplish his plans, with Gremlin overhearing the conversation while hiding. Siren appears at the Omokagedō and entices Wajima to learn about the toy plane's location and claims it ahead of Haruto and Kumagai. Just as Siren is about to destroy the toy plane to drive Kumagai into despair, Green Griffon appears to tale it from her, and Nito joins Haruto against the Phantom and her Ghouls. However, during the fight, Haruto stumbles at Fueki's Black Cerberus and rushes away in pursuit of it. After Nito defeats the Ghouls, Siren retreats and, as he wonders why Haruto had left the battle in such a hurry, Koyomi returns to Omokagedō and meets Wajima, only to collapse.
45	"The Smile in My Heart"; Transliteration: "Egao wa Mune ni" (Japanese: 笑顔は胸に)	Hidenori Ishida	Junko Kōmura	July 28, 2013
Back at the house of Tamotsu Sakai, the man in possession of the toy plane, Haruto explains to Nito the reason for his sudden leave and asks to let him deal with the White Wizard, as he also has questions to him. However, Sakai, who is an avid toy collector, refuses to return the plane to Kumagai no matter how much he is willing to pay for it. Haruto is then called by Wajima about Koyomi's condition and flees back to the Omokagedō, while Sakai's son Sho leaves the house to play by himself and is approached by Siren. Reunited with Koyomi, Haruto decides to infuse all of his mana to heal her, but she refuses, claiming that he must save enough energy to protect Kumagai. Meanwhile, Sho steals the plane and escapes to deliver it to Siren by his request, with Nito, Sakai and Shunpei pursuing him. Medusa appears to confront Nito, who struggles against her until Mayu appears to fight her in his place. Haruto returns to protect Kumagai from the Phantom, but when Black Cerberus appears before him, he considers the possibility of intentionally let Kumagai fall into despair for the sake of White Wizard's plans. However, Nito appears to assist him, and, after Siren flees, Shunpei reprimands both Haruto and Nito for straying from their mission to protect the Gates. Haruto then apologizes to Kumagai, who learns that the boy was not being controlled by the Phantom. Instead, he was acting of his own volition, as he was angry at his father for giving too much attention to his toy collection. Kumagai then decides to destroy the toy plane, claiming that his true hope comes from his memories of his late son and his desire to help others. Realizing his neglection, Sakai reconciles with his son. Mayu finds that Medusa is too much for her to handle by herself and fails to prevent her retreat. Haruto and Nito make use of all their Plamonsters combined to track down Siren, and while Kamen Rider Beast Hyper deals with her Ghouls, Kamen Rider Wizard Infinity Style finishes her with the Axcalibur's Plasma Shining Strike. Some time later, Gremlin realizes that Wiseman's real objective is not to create more Phantoms and believes that somehow it is related to Koyomi. As Misa approaches him with information about another Gate, Gremlin affirms that he now knows what he must do to obtain the Philosopher's Stone.
46	"The Cracked Feelings"; Transliteration: "Hibiwareta Omoi" (Japanese: ひび割れた思い)	Kenzo Maihara	Junko Kōmura	August 4, 2013
Haruto and the others return to the Omokagedō and are relieved to see Koyomi out of bed, though she now wears a glove to hide her wound. Meanwhile, Medusa reports to Wiseman about Gremlin's betrayal as Mayu is distraught upon failing to defeat her. However, the White Wizard approaches Mayu, offering a magic ring that can bestow her the power she needs, for a price. When the Phantom Arachne appears to wreak havoc at a flea market, Haruto and Nito confront it while Shunpei and Rinko evacuate the civilians. Willing to finish the fight as fast as possible, they transform into Kamen Rider Wizard Infinity Style and Kamen Rider Beast Hyper, forcing the enemy to flee. As the group splits up in search of the Gate, Haruto meets Gremlin at the Donut Shop Hungry who reveals that he knows something about Koyomi's condition before leaving. Fearing for her safety, Haruto rushes back home and learns from Wajima that she is safe. He discusses with him about his meeting with Gremlin, unaware that she is overhearing them. As Mayu appears claiming to seek advice from Haruto, he learns that Koyomi is missing and starts looking for her. Meanwhile, Shunpei and Rinko return to the flea market and approach a man who was there during Arachne's attack, realizing that he is a Gate when the Phantom returns and goes after him. As Medusa appears to block their escape, Nito arrives to protect them. Meanwhile, Koyomi meets Gremlin, who becomes thrilled upon learning of her condition until Haruto appears to confront him. Refusing to surrender her, Gremlin beats Haruto up before he transforms and the White Wizard appears to drive him away. As Nito fights Arachne, Medusa searches the Gate's car and, upon finding a picture of him with his pregnant wife, orders Arachne to retreat. The White Wizard learns about Koyomi's condition and Haruto reveals that he already realized that they are father and daughter. Fueki then thanks him for protecting her in his place before taking her away.
47	"The Truth About Wiseman"; Transliteration: "Waizuman no Shinjitsu" (Japanese: ワイズマンの真実)	Kenzo Maihara	Junko Kōmura	August 11, 2013
Haruto returns to the Omokagedō, where Nito and the others are watching over Masahiro Yamamoto, the Gate that they had rescued from Arachne, and reveals to them that Fueki is Koyomi's father and she is now under his custody. However, Yamamoto is distraught as he cannot contact his pregnant wife Aya and Haruto leaves with Mayu to search for her at their house. With no sign of Yamamoto's wife there, Mayu confesses to Haruto that she had met the White Wizard and tells him about the ring he promised her, in exchange for Haruto's Infinity Ring. Haruto then decides to entrust her with the ring, claiming that he trusts both her and Fueki. As Mayu brings the Infinity Ring to the White Wizard, Aya is found by Arachne, but Kamen Rider Beast appears to protect her, accompanied by Yamamoto and the others. As Beast fights the Phantom, Medusa seemingly kills Aya, driving Yamamoto into despair. However, it is revealed that she was saved by Haruto using the Defend Ring, and, upon realizing this, Yamamoto manages to keep his inner Phantom at bay. Mayu joins the fight, determined to defeat Medusa once and for all as Kamen Rider Mage, while Kamen Rider Wizard and Kamen Rider Beast fight Arachne. As Arachne is finished off by Kamen Rider Wizard Land Dragon's Special and Kamen Rider Beast Hyper's Shooting Mirage. Kamen Rider Mage deals a severe blow on Medusa using her newly gained Holy Ring. However, the Phantom does not subside and she is mortally wounded by Wiseman, who is revealed to be Fueki. As he transforms into the White Wizard, Fueki claims that Medusa has already fulfilled her purpose as his objective was not to turn Gates into Phantoms, but into wizards instead. With Yamamoto now able to become one, his plans are near fruition. Upon this revelation, Haruto and the others watch in shock as Medusa perishes.
48	"The Philosopher's Stone"; Transliteration: "Kenja no Ishi" (Japanese: 賢者の石)	Satoshi Morota	Tsuyoshi Kida	August 18, 2013
Following Medusa's death, Fueki kidnaps Yamamoto despite Nito's efforts to stop him. Back at the Omokagedō, Haruto and the others wonder about Fueki's true intentions and, after several days, all efforts to locate him become fruitless. As a blue-colored Kamen Rider Mage replenishes Koyomi's mana, Gremlin attacks Mayu and attempts to kidnap her, but is driven off by Haruto and Nito. Haruto then decides to look for Gremlin at Sora's apartment and, upon meeting him, learns from the Phantom that he intends to have at least one wizard in his possession to use as a bargaining chip against Wiseman. When Rinko approaches them, Gremlin flees and Rinko is informed that Kizaki has finally awakened from his coma. Koyomi awakens in an unfamiliar house, where she finds a photo of herself and Fueki. Upon reading his diary, she discovers that she is his daughter, who had died from an uncurable disease, which Haruto and Rinko also learn about from Kizaki. After obtaining Fueki's address from the officer, Haruto leaves alone to confront him. Meanwhile, Yuzuru appears before Nito and Mayu but acts strangely, revealing himself as the blue-colored Kamen Rider Mage who easily defeats Nito and kidnaps Mayu. At Fueki's house, Haruto learns from him that he obtained the power of magic upon creating the artificial Phantom Carbuncle and implanting it in his body. He reveals that, with the power of Haruto and the other wizards, he intends to reenact the Sabbath to gather enough mana to revive Koyomi using the Philosopher's Stone that is stored inside her lifeless body. With Haruto unwilling to cooperate, Fueki commands Yamamoto, who transforms into a green-colored Kamen Rider Mage, to attack him.
49	"The Beginning of the Sabbath"; Transliteration: "Sabato no Makuake" (Japanese: サバトの幕開け)	Satoshi Morota	Tsuyoshi Kida	September 1, 2013
Haruto defends himself against Yamamoto's attacks until Koyomi appears and the Green Kamen Rider Mage takes advantage of the distraction to defeat him. Meanwhile, Nito awakens at the Omokagedō, who were informed by Shunpei about Mayu's kidnapping. Mayu awakens beside Haruto at the White Wizard's altar and learns from Fueki that Yuzuru and Yamamoto are under his control. Now in possession of all four Wizards, Fueki makes preparations to begin the new Sabbath. Nito, Shunpei, and Rinko look in Fueki's house for clues about where he could have taken Haruto and the others when Gremlin appears before them. As the four wizards are restrained in separate points around the city, Haruto agrees to cooperate with Fueki to save Koyomi. However, he reveals that the first Sabbath failed to fully resurrect her because he used ordinary Phantoms as pillars, thus not gathering enough mana. However, Haruto's awakening as a wizard gave him the idea to strengthen the ritual by using wizards instead of Phantoms to activate it, extending the range of the Sabbath to encompass the entire Tokyo area and gather mana from all Gates within it. However, this would come at the cost of turning them into Phantoms and killing the rest of the population, just as Gremlin had speculated to Nito and the others. Despite Haruto's pleas to stop it, Fueki makes use of the ring he obtained from Wajima, the Eclipse Ring, to bring forth a solar eclipse onto the city and start the Sabbath. All humans inside the area of the spell start suffering from its effects except for Nito, who confronts the White Wizard by himself as Kamen Rider Beast. He is defeated, but manages to use Fueki's Hamel Cane to destroy his Beast Driver and free the Beast Chimera. The Phantom devours the mana released by the Sabbath and stops the ritual before bidding farewell to Nito, fleeing to parts unknown. Enraged by Nito's interference, Fueki is about to kill him when Haruto appears to confront the White Wizard.
50	"What Is Important?"; Transliteration: "Taisetsu na Mono wa" (Japanese: 大切なものは)	Shojiro Nakazawa	Tsuyoshi Kida	September 8, 2013
Haruto saves Nito from Fueki's anger, but fails to prevent the White Wizard from escaping with Koyomi. As Haruto leaves in pursuit of them, Nito reunites with Rinko, Shunpei, and the other wizards. Yamamoto declares that he does not want to be involved in their battle anymore and leaves to reunite with his wife. Yuzuru declares that he intends to keep fighting as a wizard, but Nito dissuades him from doing so, and Mayu also shows hesitation after what happened with Medusa. Back at Fueki's house, he prepares to head elsewhere with Koyomi until Gremlin attacks them. As Fueki confronts the Phantom, Koyomi finds Haruto's Infinity Ring and flees with it. The White Wizard impales Gremlin with his Hamel Cane, but as he is about to retrieve it, he realizes that Koyomi is escaping and pursues her instead. Near the lake where she used to play, Koyomi starts running out of mana as Haruto finds her, but she refuses his help, claiming that she wants to rest in peace and returns the Infinity Ring to him. Fueki appears before them and Haruto transforms into Kamen Rider Wizard Infinity Style to confront him. Their battle ends in a stalemate after they both unleash their Kick Strikes at each other. Gremlin appears and kills Fueki by destroying his Driver with the Hamel Cane, using it to extract the Philosopher's Stone from Koyomi. As Gremlin leaves with the Philosopher's Stone, Koyomi thanks Haruto for all the happy memories she had with him and their friends before dying in his arms.
51	"The Last Hope"; Transliteration: "Saigo no Kibō" (Japanese: 最後の希望)	Shojiro Nakazawa	Tsuyoshi Kida	September 15, 2013
Gremlin becomes more powerful after absorbing the Philosopher's Stone. Back at the Omokagedō, Haruto informs the others about Koyomi's death and shuts himself in his room. However, Gremlin begins rampaging in an attempt to draw mana and fuel the Philosopher Stone, destroying the Donut Shop Hungry's van. Despite having no magic power, Nito, Rinko, and Shunpei attempt to protect the civilians from Gremlin's Ghouls. As they find themselves cornered, Mayu, Yuzuru, and Yamamoto appear to rescue them. Together, the three Kamen Rider Mages dispose of the Ghouls, but are easily defeated by Gremlin. Determined to fulfill Koyomi's last wish, Haruto joins the fight, but even Kamen Rider Wizard Infinity Style fails to defeat Gremlin and he is forced to turn back to Flame Style. Refusing to give up, Kamen Rider Wizard retrieves the Philosopher's Stone from within Gremlin's body. Reunited with Koyomi in spirit, The Philosopher's Stone transforms into the Hope Ring and he finishes off Gremlin with an enhanced Kick Strike. Some time later, Mayu has joined Section Zero with Rinko, Nito, accompanied by Yuzuru, has begun searching for the Beast Chimera to learn more about it, Yamamoto is living happily with his wife and daughter, Shunpei has become Wajima's ringcraft apprentice, the Donut Hungry Shop has returned to business, and Haruto has left on a travel to look for a place to hide the Philosopher's Stone and ensure that it will be never used again.
52	"The Kamen Rider Rings"; Transliteration: "Kamen Raidā no Yubiwa" (Japanese: 仮面ライダーの指輪)	Hidenori Ishida	Shō Aikawa	September 22, 2013
A band of monsters are locating a chest containing the Rider Rings, only for them to be stolen by two children. Meanwhile on his new journey after Gremlin's destruction, Haruto hears the cries of children from a giant Magic Stone and is sucked in. He soon awakes and finds himself in an alternate world where all of the various monsters ever defeated by Kamen Riders end up in. He manages to run into the children as well as the elder versions of the Doughnut Shop Hungry's Manager and Worker and younger versions of Rinko and Shunpei. Furthermore, civilians around them begin transforming into monsters to capture the children under the order of Amadum, the ruler of the world. The children escape using Kamen Riders Double, Fourze, Faiz, and Kabuto; while Kamen Riders OOO and Decade are the children's getaway drivers. Before departing, Kamen Rider Decade questions Haruto if this is the World of Wizard, only for Haruto to refute the claim. Later, Haruto passes by an alternate version of the Omokagedō, where the world's Wajima explains to him that the children are beginning to transform into monsters. While watching over the children, he learns that the little girl's name is Koyomi. Suddenly, Amadum summons Haruto and explains that he needs the Rider Rings to prevent the monsters spilling into a new world. He also meets Nito, who came to this world prior to losing Beast Chimera, in Amadum's lair as well. On their way back, Haruto notices a mirage of Koyomi, then looks at this new ring and asking Koyomi if that is her wish. Returning with Nito to the Omokagedō, Haruto learns that the children are gone, but not before they trapped Wajima, Shunpei, and Rinko in the Mirror World using the Ryuki Rider Ring. Using the Clear Ring, Haruto enters the Mirror World where Kamen Rider Ryuki tells him that the children need to be protected just before releasing everyone from the Mirror World. However, before leaving, Wajima explains to Haruto that the children were destined to become monsters, but they believe that in leaving their world they hope they can remain human. The children escape only to run into Amadum's followers. Haruto and Nito get to them in time, but are brushed aside. Nito expresses that it is not part of Amadum's bargain, so both Haruto and Nito transform to fight. The boy uses a WizarDriver to summon Kamen Riders Hibiki, Kiva, Den-O, Agito, and Kuuga to save themselves, but also fight off Kamen Rider Wizard and Beast, as they realize that Haruto and Nito are also trying to stop them. The children then use the rings in an attempt to escape the world, calling out to someone on to Earth to save them. Suddenly, a young man turns around and is beckoned by the cries. A portal opens and something crashes out from it, which reveals to be a new Kamen Rider in orange-colored armor who singlehandedly destroys Amadum's followers. Kamen Rider Wizard asks the new Kamen Rider who he is and the young man proclaims that he is Armored Rider Gaim.
53	"The Endless Story"; Transliteration: "Owaranai Monogatari" (Japanese: 終わらない物語)	Hidenori Ishida	Shō Aikawa	September 29, 2013
After Armored Rider Gaim introduces himself to Kamen Riders Wizard and Beast, he is able to return to his world before Amadum appears. He then overpowers the summoned Kamen Riders as he tells Haruto and Nito that the children will fully transform into monsters soon. Before Amadum and his monsters attack them, Nito gives Haruto two of his rings, so he can escape with the children, and he also steals the Fourze Kamen Rider Ring. Amadum summons Kamen Rider Decade to retrieve the stolen ring. After they escape, the children tell Haruto the reason why they want to leave their world and they want him to kill them if they transform into monsters. While Haruto wonders what can he do to save the alternate Koyomi, Kamen Rider Decade appears, cancelling his transformation. Tsukasa Kadoya wonders why Haruto has entered the World of Monsters, to which he replies that he heard voices that needed help. Nito sneaks into Amadum's lair, however he knows that Kamen Rider Beast is in his lair, so he summons all of the Kamen Riders and tells Nito that the Kamen Riders' power are born in the World of Monsters, including Kamen Riders Wizard and Beast and he wants to gain the powers for himself. Nito transforms, but he is easily defeated by Amadum's monster lackeys and he starts to disappear into dust. While Rinko and Shunpei are taking care of the children, monsters appear to attack them as Tsukasa threatens Haruto to return the Kamen Rider Ring to Amadum. Tsukasa arrives at Amadum's lair, along with the boy, and returns the ring to Amadum. Amadum tells Tsukasa that he is imprisoned in the World of Monsters and he wanted to escape out of this world. Haruto also appears, so Amadum summons all of the Kamen Riders to attack Haruto, but they refuses his order. Tsukasa tells Amadum that Kamen Riders fight for freedom, besides justice. Amadum then summons other monsters to attack the Kamen Riders, so Tsukasa and Haruto transform. After defeating the monsters, Amadum forces the boy to pray for help. The Kamen Riders tries to stop him, but Amadum reveals his true monstrous form and manages to absorb all of the Kamen Riders' powers. The boy decides to stay in World of Monsters after hearing Haruto's words on what it means to fight for, as he prays to call someone. Armored Rider Gaim arrives as he take the name of "Kamen Rider Gaim" before he overpowers Amadum, while also learning the meaning of being a Kamen Rider. The Kamen Riders regain their powers as they change into their most powerful forms to defeat Amadum. After Amadum is defeated, the Kamen Rider Rings vanish as the Kamen Riders return to their worlds. Tsukasa continues his journey as Haruto tells the boy that he does not need to become a monster, but can instead become a Kamen Rider, giving the boy the Infinity Ring before resuming his journey in his own world. As Wajima, Rinko, and Shunpei bring Koyomi, who has recovered, to see the boy, she says his name: Haruto.
