= Meibutsu =

Japanese term most often applied to regional specialties

Meibutsu (名物, lit. 'famous thing') is a Japanese term most often applied to regional specialties (also known as meisan (名産)).

Meibutsu can also be applied to specialized areas of interest, such as chadō, where it refers to famous tea utensils, or Japanese swords, where it refers to specific named famous blades.

== Definition ==
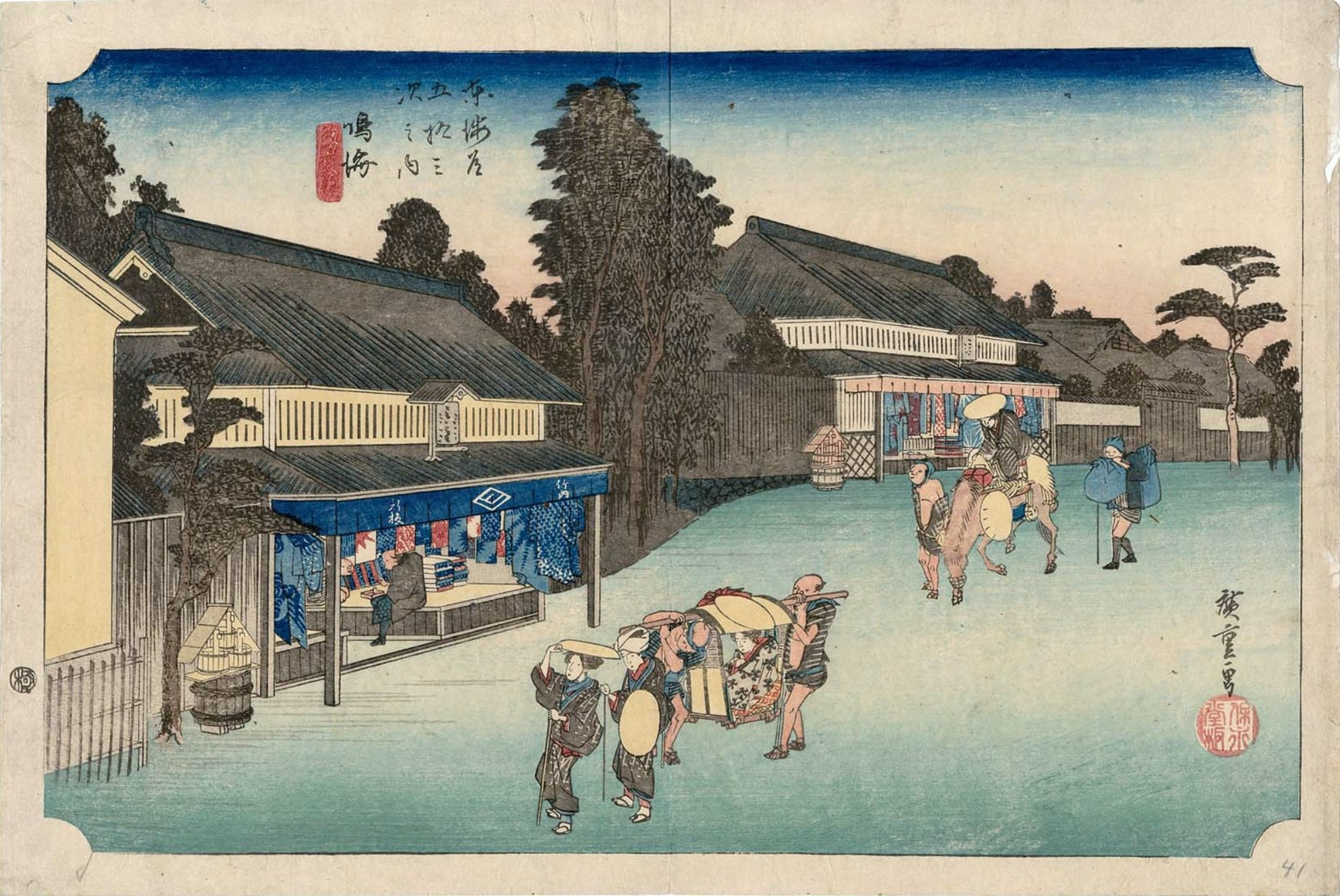
The town of Arimatsu, Aichi: famous for its tie-dyed fabric

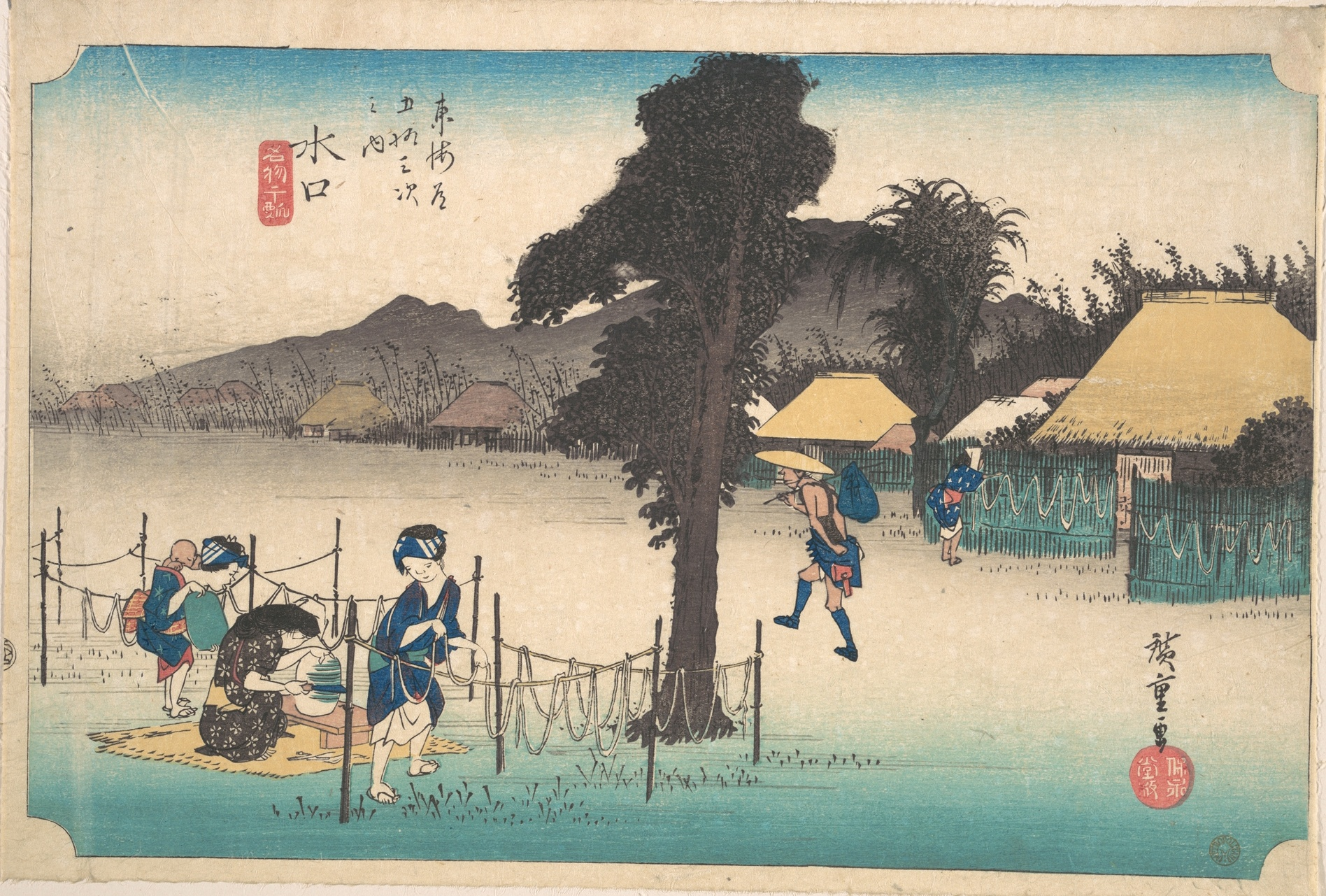
Minakuchi: famous for its pickled gourds

Meibutsu could be classified into the following five categories:

- Tokusanhin, regional Japanese food specialties such as the roasted rice cakes (yakimochi) of Hodogaya, and the yam gruel, toro-jiru of Mariko;
- Japanese crafts as souvenirs such as the swords of Kamakura or the shell-decorated screens of Enoshima;

Historically, meibutsu also included:

- Supernatural souvenirs and wonder-working panaceas, such as the bitter powders of Menoke that supposedly cured a large number of illnesses;
- Bizarre things that added a touch of the "exotic" to the aura of each location such as the fire-resistant salamanders of Hakone; and
- Prostitutes, who made localities such as Shinagawa, Fujisawa, Akasaka, Yoshida and Goyu famous. In some cases these people may have encouraged visits to otherwise impoverished and remote localities, contributing to the local economy and the exchange between people of different backgrounds.

Several prints in various versions of the ukiyo-e series The Fifty-Three Stations of the Tōkaidō depict meibutsu. These include Arimatsu shibori, various tie-dyed fabrics sold at Narumi (station 41), and kanpyō (sliced gourd), a product of Minakuchi (station 51), as well as a famous teahouse at Mariko (station 21) and a famous tateba (rest stop) selling a type of ricecake called ubagamochi at Kusatsu (station 51).

Another category are special tea tools that were historic and precious items of Japanese tea ceremony.

== Usage ==
Evelyn Adam gave the following account of meibutsu in her 1910 book, Behind the Shoji:

The strain of giving would really become unendurable to half the people in Japan were it not for what is known as the "meibutsu" or specialty of each town. This fills in gaps nicely; this provides the answer to vexed questions. "What shall I give to the kind person from whom I have received my twenty-fifth English lesson?" "A meibutsu." "And what shall I send my ailing father-in-law?" "A meibutsu" also, both to be brought back from the next place I happen to visit. The shops there are sure to make a reduction on quantity, well knowing that every person who goes off on a holiday is expected to return with "meibutsu" for everybody he knows, the idea being that a person who has enjoyed himself and had nothing particular to do should try to make up to those left behind in the place where they belong, engaged in the usual dull routine. Help to lift somebody out of the rut by bringing home to him or her some little novelty—that is the kindly spirit—and never mind what the trifle may be. Whether a metal pipe or a bamboo toy, it can be presented with perfect propriety to grandmother or infant grandson.

"Meibutsus" vary greatly of course. Some are sticky like the chestnut paste of Nikko, some are bulky and a source of perpetual anxiety like the fragile baskets of Arima, some are pretty like the Ikao cotton cloth dyed in the iron spring water, and some are useless and ugly and impossible to carry, like the fierce fishes of Kamakura—the fishes which blow themselves up into a globe when angry or excited and then remain blown up—as an eternal punishment I suppose—and get turned into lanterns. There are dozens of all varieties, useful and useless, dear and queer, sensible and silly, so that people with much-travelled acquaintances are soon in a fair way to start a museum. Or, to be accurate, they would be if they kept the things. But nobody does keep them all. The provident housekeeper constantly receiving "meibutsus," and constantly requiring things to send back in return, has invented a system to circumvent the expense. It is somewhat like double entry book-keeping. When the need for the return gift arises, she goes, like old Mother Hubbard, to her cupboard and looks over the parcels that have arrived lately. Distinctive things like blown-up fish may be out of the question, but there are sure to be some local or non-committal contributions. Doubtless there will be eggs hardly a month old yet, and cakes that only came week before last. Either of these will do nicely; therefore the lady wraps them up properly and passes them on. Nine times out of ten, she who receives them does the same; also her friend and her friend's friend, till those eggs or cakes are nearly as travelled as a war correspondent.

== Examples ==
Prefecture	Traditional crafts	Agricultural products	Tokusanhin (specialities)
Aichi	Akazu ware, pottery; Arimatsu natsumi shibori; Hōraku ware, pottery – Nagoya; Fude, calligraphy brush – Toyohashi; Kawana ware, blue and white transferware porcelain – Nagoya; Sensu, folding fan – Nagoya; Onigawara, ogre-faced roof tile; Seto ware, pottery; Shippō (截金), cloisonné – Ama, Aichi; Tokoname ware, pottery – Nagoya	Hatcho miso; Nagoya Kochin, chicken; Shrimp	Ankake spaghetti; Curry udon; Doteni, intestines simmered in miso; Ebi furai; Ebi senbei, shrimp crackers; Hitsumabushi; Kishimen, flat udon; Miso nikomi udon, udon in a miso broth with vegetables; Miso katsu; Miso oden; Moriguchizuke, daikon pickled in sake lees; Ogura toast, sandwich of butter and red bean paste; Oni manjū, steamed cake with cubes of mochi and sweet potato; Taiwan ramen, local version of Tan Tsu Mien; Tatami iwashi; Tebasaki karaage, deep-fried chicken wings; Tenmusu; Toriwasu, chicken sashimi; Uirō
Akita	Akita ginsen-zaiku, silver filigree; Akita sugi-okedaru, cedar buckets; Honjō-nuri, lacquerware – Yurihonjō; Itaya-zaiku, woven maple wood baskets; Kabazaiku, cherry bark boxes and tea caddies – Kakunodate; Kawatsura-shikki, lacquerware – Kawatsura; Kokeshi – Kawatsura; Magewappa, bent wood cedar boxes – Ōdate; Naraoka-yaki, pottery – Daisen, Akita; Noshiro-shunkei, lacquerware – Noshiro, Akita; Shiraiwa-yaki, pottery – Kakunodate, Akita	Buri; Hatahata, Japanese sandfish; Hinai-jidori, chicken; Junsai, water lily; Otake ichijiku, fig – Nikaho	Damako nabe, rice ball hotpot; Iburigakko, smoked pickled daikon; Imonokojiru, taro stew; Inaniwa udon; Junsai nabe; Kiritanpo nabe; Shottsuru; Tonburi; Yokote yakisoba
Aomori	Kokeshi; Tsugaru tako, painted kite; Tsugaru-jamisen, shamisen; Tsugaru-nuri (津軽塗), lacquerware – Hirosaki; Tsugaru no hatobue, clay whistle shaped like a pigeon; Yawata uma, carved wooden horse	Apples; Black garlic; Cassis, blackcurrant; Maguro – Ōma; Owani onsen moyashi, soybean sprout – Ōwani; Jusankosan yamato shijimi, clams – Goshogawara; Shimizumori namba, red pepper – Hirosaki; Steuben grape – Tsuruta	Apple pie; Bara yaki, grilled beef rib meat; Hittsumi, roux with chicken and vegetables – Nanbu, Aomori; Ichigo-ni, clear soup of thinly sliced sea urchin roe and abalone; Ikamenchi, minced squid fritter; Jappa-jiru, fish gut and vegetable soup, usually cod or salmon; Kaiya or kayaki, scallop boiled with egg and miso in its own shell; Keiran, red bean soup with dumplings; Senbei jiru, senbei soup
Chiba	Bōshu uchiwa, flat fan – Minamibōsō and Tateyama; Chiba koshogu, iron artisan's tools such as sickles, hoes, knives and western-style scissors – Bōsō Peninsula	Biwa; Hamaguri; Ise ebi; Peanuts; Soy sauce; Takenoko	Aji no tataki, chopped horse mackerel; Ise-ebi senbei, spiny lobster crackers; Namerō; Peanut monaka; Suzumeyaki, broiled Crucian carp; Tai senbei, Teppōzuke, pickles – Narita
Ehime	Cultured pearls; Tobe ware	Goishicha; Iyokan; Mikan; Tai	Botchan dango; Goshiki somen (five-color somen); Imotaki; Jakoten; Satsuma jiru, miso and pork stew; Uwajima Tai-meshi
Fukui	Echizen Uchihamono, kitchen knives and scissors – Echizen; Echizen ware, pottery; Echizen washi – Echizen; Wakasa nuri, lacquerware – Wakasa	Miyazaki takenoko, bamboo shoots; Sakuradai, "cherry" seabream caught in early spring; Yoshikawa nasu, eggplant – Sabae; Zuwaigani, snow crab – Echizen	Echizengani-nabe, nabe dish of Echizen snow crab; Eihei-ji goma-dofu; Funa sashimi; Hamayaki saba, mackerel grilled seaside; Kodai no sasazuke, preserved sea bream - Obama; Oroshi soba; Saba no heshiko, grilled rice bran pickled mackerel; Satoimo no koroni, soy sauce stewed taro; Sauce katsudon; Sugo, pickled Yatsugashira taro stalks; Volga rice – Echizen
Fukuoka	Agano ware, pottery – Fukuchi; Amagi no bata-bata, painted pellet drum; Hakata doll – Fukuoka City; Hakata koma, iron spinning top; Hakata-ori, woven fabric – Fukuoka City; Hakata magemono, bent wood items; Karume kasuri, woven fabric – Kurume; Ki uso, carved wooden bird toy; Koishiwara ware, pottery – Koshiwara; Takatori ware, pottery	Amaou strawberries – Itojima; Hakata-jidori, chicken; Mentaiko; Yamecha	Goma saba; Hitokushi gyoza, "one-bite gyoza"; Karashi mentaiko; Meika Hiyoko, chick-shaped baked buns stuffed with yellow bean jam; Menbei, mentaiko and other seafood senbei; Mentaisenbei, mentaiko senbei; Mizutaki, chicken soup; Motsunabe; Niwaka-senpei, cookie shaped like Hakata Niwaka mask; Takana gohan, fried rice with pickled takana; Tonkotsu ramen
Fukushima	Aizuhongō ware, pottery – Aizu region; Aizu shikki, lacquerware – Aizu region; Akabeko, bobblehead red cow toy – Aizu region; Kokeshi; Miharu-goma, wooden horse – Miharu; Ōborisōma ware, pottery; Okiagari-koboshi, papier-mâché toy – Aizu region	Fukushima beef; Peaches	Awa manjū, steamed millet buns stuffed with red bean paste; Dobu-jiru, stewed ankimo and vegetables; Ikaninjin, squid and carrot in soy-sauce; Kitakata ramen; Kozuyu, osechi soup made from dried scallops, mushrooms, and vegetables – Aizu; Mamador; Namie yakisoba; Nishin no sanshouduke, dried Pacific herring pickled with sansho; Shirakawa ramen – Shirakawa
Gifu	Enako bandori, straw raincoat – Takayama; Hida-shunkei, lacquerware – Takayama; Japanese kitchen knives – Seki; Mino washi, traditional paper used in lanterns (岐阜提灯, Gifu Chōchin), umbrellas (岐阜和傘, Gifu Wagasa) and fans (岐阜うちわ, Gifu Uchiwa); Mino ware, pottery; Oribe ware, pottery; Shino ware, pottery; Sarubobo, monkey amulet – Takayama	Ayu, especially via Cormorant fishing on the Nagara River; Fuyu; Hida beef; Hida beni kabu, red turnip; Sayori-meshi, rice cooked with salted sanma – Kani and Mitake	Akakabu-zuke, red turnip pickles – Hida Takayama; Chūka soba, Takayama ramen; Hoba miso, beef grilled with miso on top of a dried magnolia leaf – Takayama; Keichan, sautéed chicken and cabbage; Kurikinton; Tatami iwashi
Gunma	Daruma – Takasaki, Gunma; Kiryū ori, brocade – Kiryū, Gunma; Takasaki maneki neko, papier-mâché	Hoshi-imo, wind dried sweet potato; Joshu beef; Konnyaku; Pork; Rainbow trout; Shimonita negi, green onions	Isobe senbei; Kamameshi; Himokawa udon, extremely wide udon; Miso pan; Mizusawa udon, udon in sesame sauce; Okkirikomi, hand cut noodles in a soy sauce and mirin broth; Tōge no kamameshi, mountain pass kettle rice; Torimeshi, chicken cooked in tea rice; Yakimanju, grilled manjū
Hiroshima	Fude, calligraphy brush – Kumano; Hariko, papier-mâché masks and dolls – Miyajima; Kendama, cup and ball game – Hatsukaichi; Otagawa glass; Shakushi made from cherry wood – Miyajima	Anago; Hiroshimana, a variety of Chinese cabbage; Lemons; Oysters	Calbee; Dote-nabe, nabemono dish of oysters, tofu and vegetables stewed in a miso-based broth; Momiji manjū; Monaka; Okonomiyaki; Onomichi ramen; Shakushi Senbei, senbei shaped like ladles; Tsukemen
Hokkaido	Kibori kuma, carved wooden bear – Yakumo, Hokkaido; Nibutani bark cloth	Corn; Dairy products; Kombu; Lavender; Salmon; Yubari King cantaloupe	Butadon; Chanchan-yaki, miso grilled salmon with vegetables; Ikameshi; Ika sōmen; Ishikari-nabe, salmon and vegetables cooked in a miso broth; Japanese wine; Jingisukan; Matsumaezuke; Muroran curry ramen; Sanpei-jiru, a winter vegetable and salmon miso soup; Sapporo ramen; Shiroi Koibito; Rui-be; Royce'; Uni donburi; Zangi, deep fried chicken marinated in soy sauce and ginger
Hyōgo	Awaji ware, pottery; Banshū kebari, fly fishing ties – Nishiwaki, Hyōgo; Incense; Izushi ware, pottery – Izushi; Tamba ware, pottery	Ako salt; Hamo; Kobe beef; Kuromame, black soybeans; Sanda beef; Tai	Akashiyaki; Botan nabe, wild boar hot pot; Butaman – Kobe; Castella; Fugetsudo; Himeji oden; Ikanago no kukini, sand lance tsukudani; Kakogawa katsumeshi, beef cutlet served on rice with demi-glace – Kakogawa; Shiome manju – Akō
Ibaraki	Awano shunkei-nuri, lacquerware; Kasama-yaki, pottery – Kasama; Yūki-tsumugi – Yūki	Anko; Edosaki kabocha; Hitachi wagyu; Hoshi-imo, dried sweet potato; Natto; Okukuji Shamo chicken	Ankoimo; Anko nabe, anglerfish nabe; Kenchin jiru; Miso peanuts; Namegata-don, seafood and vegetables over rice; Shishi-nabe, wild boar hotpot
Ishikawa	Kaga mizuhaki; Kutani ware, glazed porcelain – Kaga, Ishikawa; Wajima-nuri – Wajima, Ishikawa; Yamanaka-nuri – Kaga, Ishikawa	Japanese amberjack; Kaga yasai, traditional vegetables; Kukicha, processed either as bancha or hōjicha; Noto salt; Snow crab	Gori-karaage, deep-fried gori; Gori-tsukudani, gori simmered in soy sauce, sometimes with walnuts; Hasumushi, steamed lotus root egg dish; Ishiru hotpot, hotpot cooked with fish sauce instead of soy sauce; Jibu-ni; Kaburazushi, turnip sushi; Kamifūsen, balloon shaped sweet filled with kingyoku jelly – Kanazawa; Kaisendon, seafood rice bowl; Kintsuba, red beans and agar wagashi – Kanazawa; Rakugan, pressed dry sweets – Kanazawa
Iwate	Hidehira-nuri, lacquerware; Iwayadotansu (岩谷堂箪笥), wooden chests of drawers – Ōshū, Iwate; Johoji lacquerware; Kokeshi; Tetsubin, cast iron kettle	Abalone (farmed); Kashi gaki, persimmon – Kamaishi; Wasabi; Wakame (farmed)	Mamebu, wheat dumplings filled with walnut; Morioka jajamen; Morioka reimen; Nambu senbei; Wanko soba
Kagawa	Kagawa shikki, lacquerware – Takamatsu; Marugame uchiwa, flat fan – Marugame; Sanuki itto-bori, chisel woodcarving – Kotohira and Mannō; Sanukite instruments; Takamatsu hariko, papier-mâché dolls –Takamatsu	Cochin chicken; Cotton; Kagawa mototaka pepper; Olives; Salt – Seto Inland Sea region; Sanuki no yume wheat; Sugar	An-mochi zoni, zōni with red bean paste stuffed mochi in a white miso broth; Honetsuki tori, fried chicken – Marugame; Iriko meshi, iriko cooked with rice; Mamba no kenchan, stirfried mustard leaf and tofu; Oshinuki sushi, sushi made with spring sawara; Sakana no sambai, grilled small fish marinated in vinegar, mirin and soy sauce; Sanuki udon; Shippoku Udon; Shoyumame; Teppai, cold dish of carp; Teuchi udon; Uchikomi jiru, noodle soup; Wakagi-ae, Japanese scallion mixed with razor clams or asari clams
Kagoshima	Oshima tsumugi; Satsuma kiriko, cut glass; Satsuma ware, pottery; Tai-guruma, toy red snapper on wheels; Yoronjima bashōfu, banana fiber cloth	Chiran tea; Katsuobushi; Kibinago; Kurobuta, pork; Kurozu, black vinegar; Satsuma jidori, chicken; Wasanbon	Akumaki; Kagoshima ramen; Karukan; Keihan rice
Kanagawa	Hakone yosegi-zaiku (箱根寄木細工), wooden marquetry – Hakone and Odawara; Kamakura-bori, carved lacquerware – Kamakura	Salt pickled cherry blossoms; Shirasu; Shōnan pork	Botan nabe, wild boar hot pot; Gyūnabe; Hato Sabure, dove-shaped sablé; Kaigun kare, Japanese curry; Kenchin jiru; Misaki maguro ramen, tuna ramen; Namashirasu-don, raw shirasu over rice; Odawara kamaboko; Sanma-men, Yokohama ramen; Shutō
Kōchi	Tosa uchihamono, hammered cutlery; Tosa washi	Goishicha; Ginger; Skipjack tuna; Yuzu	Dorome; Katsuo no Tataki
Kumamoto	Amakusa pottery; Higo zogan, damascene; Konohazaru, monkey pottery dolls; Shōdai ware, pottery – Arao; Tatami	Basashi; Karaimo; Kensan igusa, rush; Majaku, Japanese mud shrimp	Dagojiru; Fuga-maki, bean paste wrapped in nori; Hitomoji guruguru, boiled green onion with mustard sauce; Ikinari dango; Jindaiko; Karashi renkon, mustard stuffed lotus root; Kumamoto ramen; Takamori dengaku; Yamato croquette – Yamato
Kyoto	Asahi ware, pottery – Uji; Fushimi ningyo, clay doll; Kyō ware, pottery; Kiyomizu ware; Rengetsu ware; Nishijin-ori; Sensu, folding fan; Tango chirimen; Uchiwa, flat fan	Ebi-imo, taro; Hōjicha; Kyo-yasai, Kyoto traditional vegetables; Saikyo miso; Shogoin turnip; Uji tea	Awafu, namafu made with millet as well as glutinous rice; Buri shabu, yellowtail hotpot – Ine; Hamo no otoshi, blanched pike conger; Konpeitō; Nishin soba, soba topped with dried Pacific herring; Saba heshiko, spicy nukazuke mackerel – Ine; Saikyoyaki, grilled fish pickled in Saikyo miso; Tsukemono, including: Semmaizuke, sliced turnip pickled in mirin; Shibazuke, eggplant pickled with red perilla; Sugukizuke, salt pickled whole turnip; Yatsuhashi; Yudofu
Mie	Banko ware, pottery – Yokkaichi; Iga ware, pottery – Iga; Ise washi – Ise	Aosa nori; Hamaguri; Ise tea; Matsusaka beef; Spiny lobster	Akafuku, mochi covered in red bean paste -Ise; Ise udon, thick noodles in a sweet soy sauce; Nagamochi, grilled oblong mochi stuffed with red bean paste; Sanma-zushi; Tatami iwashi; Tekone-zushi, soy sauce marinated bonito over sushi rice
Miyagi	Kinoshita-goma, carved wooden horse; Kokeshi; Sendaihira, woven silk fabric for hakama – Sendai; Tansu; Tsutsumi ningyo, clay doll; Tsutsumi-yaki, pottery; Yanagiu-washi, paper	Coho salmon (farmed); Hoya, sea pineapple; Oysters; Seri, Japanese parsley	Aburafu, deep fried wheat gluten – Tome; Gyūtan – Sendai; Harako-meshi, rice cooked in salmon stock and topped with ikura – Watari; Hiyashi chūka; Robatayaki – Sendai; Sasa-kamaboko, kamaboko shaped like bamboo leaves – Sendai; Shiroishi umen, wheat noodles made without oil – Shiroishi; Shisho-maki, Deep fried miso walnut paste rolled in perilla leaves – Ōsaki; Yubeshi; Zundamochi, mochi covered in edamame paste – Sendai
Miyazaki	Jindaigoma, spinning top; Hyūga go shi – Hyūga	Chestnuts – Suki; Hyuganatsu; Kumquat; Mango	Aoshima senbei; Cheese manjū; Chicken namban; Gobochi, gobo chips; Hiyajiru, cold miso soup with cucumber; Karukan; Miyazaki no sumibiyaki, chicken grilled over charcoal; Nanjakorya Daifuku, lit. "What is this?" daifuku stuffed with a strawberry, chestnut paste, cream cheese, and red bean paste; Sumibiyaki, charcoal-grilled chicken
Nagano	Butsudan – Iiyama; Matsushiro ware; Mizuhiki – Iida	Common carp – Saku; Chestnuts – Obuse; Ichida gaki, persimmon – Iida and Iijima; Nozawana – Nozawaonsen; Walnuts – Tōmi; Wasabi	Goheimochi, grilled mochi made from non-glutinous rice; Inago no Tsukudani; Korimochi, naturally freeze-dried mochi; Pickled nozawana; Oyaki; Soba; Sunki, pickled red turnip stalk and leaves; Yawataya Isogorō shichimi togarashi
Nagasaki	Hasami ware; Hirado ware; Koga ningyo, clay doll; Nagasaki hata, kite; Pearls; Sasebogoma, spinning top; Vidro, blown glass	Camellia oil	Castella; Champon; Kakuni; Karasumi; Sara udon; Sasebo burger; Toruko raisu (Turkish rice), tonkatsu over curry rice and spaghetti
Nara	Akahada ware, pottery; Nara Fude; Nara ittobori (奈良一刀彫), woodcarving; Nara uchiwa, carved paper fan; Shikamikuji, carved deer with o-mikuji in its mouth; Sumi, inkstick; Takayama Tea Whisk; Tora hariko, papier-mâché tiger	Hōjicha; Kuzu; Persimmon; Strawberries; Watermelon; Yamato tea	Aburakasu, deep-fried beef intestine; Asuka-nabe, hot pot of chicken and vegetables cooked in milk; Chagayu, kayu cooked in tea; Kakinoha-zushi, salted mackerel sushi wrapped in persimmon leaf; Kashiwa no sukiyaki, chicken sukiyaki; Kasuzuke, especially narazuke, aged pickles flavored with mirin; Kuzumochi; Manjū; Mikasayaki, a kind of dorayaki; Miwa sōmen; Momiuri, cucumber sunomono; Nyumen, somen noodles in a hot broth; Shishi-nabe, wild boar hotpot; Wakakusa nabe, spinach hotpot – Nara (city); Yubeshi
Niigata	Anchi ware, pottery – Agano; Mumyōi ware, pottery – Sado; Neko chigura, cat basket; Sankaku daruma, conical daruma; Tarai-bune, tub boats	Echigohime strawberries; Le Lectier pears; Rice, especially Koshihikari	Fried half chicken, half of a chicken seasoned with curry powder and salt then deepfried; Hegi-soba, soba made with funori; Namban miso, chili-infused miso; Noko miso ramen, rich miso ramen with side broth to dilute it – Niigata (city); Noppe; Sasa dango; Tare katsudon; Wappa meshi, cooked rice steamed with dashi and seafood in a bentwood box – Niigata (city)
Ōita	Bamboo weaving – Beppu; Geta – Hita, Ōita; Onta ware, pottery	Aji; Bungo beef; Fugu; Japanese horse mackerel; Kabosu, citrus; Kuruma prawn; Marbled flounder; Dried shiitake mushrooms; Saffron	Buri no atsumeshi, marinated yellowtail over rice; Dango-jiru, dumpling miso soup; Gomadashi udon, grilled fish ground with sesame seeds and soy sauce served over udon; Karaage; Karukan; Jigokumushi, steamed food cooked by Beppu's hot springs; Takanazushi, sushi made with takana and nori; Toriten; Yuzukoshō
Okayama	Bizen ware, pottery; Kurashiki hariko, papier-mâché zodiac dolls, most famous is a bobble headed tiger	Muscat grape; White peach; Sawara	Barazushi, scattered fish and vegetables over sushi rice; Demi-katsudon; Kakioko, oyster okonomiyaki – Hinase; Kasaoka ramen, chicken broth ramen; Kusagina meshi, verbena rice – Kurashiki; Hiruzen yakisoba; Horumon yaki-udon – Tsuyama; Kibi dango (Okayama); Mamakari-zushi, pickled sappa over rice; Shino udon -Tamashima; Takomeshi, steamed octopus rice
Okinawa	Bingata; Chin-chin uma, papier-mâché toy of Okinawan king on horseback; Kumejima-tsumugi; Ryukyuan lacquerware, lacquerware inlaid with shells and often red; Ryukyuan pottery; Tsuboya ware; Shisa	Beni imo, ube; Goya; Hirami lemon; Kokuto (黒糖), Okinawan brown sugar; Shima rakkyo, island shallot; Umi-budō	Awamori; Chanpurū; Chinsuko; Hirayachi; Ikasumi, squid ink pasta; Kippan; Kōrēgusu; Mimiga; Muchi; Okinawa soba; Rafute; Sata andagi; Shima-dōfu, Okinawa tofu; Soki; Sukugarasu, salt cured rabbit fish on tofu; Taco rice; Tōfuyō; Yagi sashimi, raw goat meat
Osaka	Kosobe ware, pottery – Takatsuki; Naniwa tinware – Osaka; Sakaiuchi chef knives – Sakai	Fugu; Naniwa-yasai, Osaka traditional vegetables; Genpachi mono, shiso sprouts; Kema kyuuri, cucumber; Kintoki ninjin, carrot; Nanba negi, green onion; Kotsuma nankin, pumpkin; Osaka shirona, Chinese cabbage; Tanabe daikon; Tamatsukuri kuromon shirouri, oriental pickling melon; Tennōji kabura, turnip	Battera zushi; Chinsuko; Harihari-nabe; Keshimochi, red bean filled mochi covered in poppy seeds – Sakai; Kitsune udon; Kushikatsu; Mojimi no tempura, tempura salt-preserved maple leaves – Minoh; Takoyaki; Okonomiyaki
Saga	Arita ware, porcelain – Arita; Kakiemon; Karatsu ware, pottery – Karatsu; Saga Nishiki	Saga gyu, beef; Saga Nori; Takezaki crab; Yabuko squid	Dagojiru, chicken and noodle soup; Kakinoha-zushi, trout sushi wrapped in a persimmon leaf; Kuri okowa, sticky rice with chestnuts; Mutsugoro no Kabayaki, grilled mudskipper; Ogi yōkan; Saganishiki, a steamed chestnut cake named after the brocade; Sicilian rice, combination of rice, salad, and meat
Saitama	Aizome, indigo dyed fabric; Chichibu meisen, ikat silk fabric – Chichibu; Kimekomi ningyo (Iwatsuki ningyo), molded wood pulp doll covered in fabric – Saitama; Kōnosu no akamono, lucky red things – Kōnosu; Ogawa washi – Ogawa; Oshie hagoita – Kasukabe	Ayu; Eel; Sayama tea; Sweet potato	Chushichi meshi, rice with wasabi, yuzu, green onions, and dashi – Ogawa; Fukashi, stick of wheat bran covered in brown sugar – Kawagoe; Gokabou; Higashimatsuyama yakitori, pork head prepared in the style of yakitori; Hiyajiru udon, cold udon in broth with cucumber and sesame seeds; Igamanju, red bean paste manjū covered in adzuki beans and rice; Miso potato, fried breaded potatoes with miso sauce; Niboto udon; Zeri furai, deep-fried potato and okara patty
Shiga	Amiito tsumugi, recycled silk for obi; Hikone butsudan – Hikone; Shigaraki ware, pottery, often used for tanuki statues – Shigaraki; Zeze ware, pottery – Ōtsu	Aka konnyaku (赤こんにゃく), red konjac – Ōmihachiman; Ōmi beef	Funazushi (鮒寿司), Crucian carp pickled in rice; Kamo-nabe (鴨鍋), duck hotpot; Tsukudani; Yaki saba sōmen (焼鯖素麺), grilled mackerel with sōmen – Nagahama
Shimane	Anesama ningyo, paper doll; Iwami ware – Okuizumo, Shimane; Izumo nankin, tōrō – Matsue and Izumo, Shimane; Sekishu washi; Shimenawa; Unshu soraban	Blackthroat seaperch; Hikimi wasabi; Iwami pork; Kojoyu miso – Oki Islands; Melon; Saijo persimmon; Shiji-ko Shitchin, the Seven Delicacies of Lake Shinji: Amasagi, lake smelt whitebait; Carp; Moroge-ebi, Japanese tiger prawn; Shijimi, clams; Shirauo, Japanese icefish; Suzuki, Japanese sea bass; Unagi; Shimane grapes; Shimane wagyu	Agonoyaki, skewered and grilled flying fish surimi; Aka ten, spicy deepfried kamaboko – Hamada; Botebotecha, okowa whipped with bancha and other ingredients – Matsue; Hekayaki, tilefish sukiyaki; Imoni – Tsuwano; Izumo soba or wariko soba; Kanshimame-zuke don, marinated squid liver rice bowl – Ama; Maitake gohan, mushroom rice – Iinan; Matsue ramen; Shijimi soup; Suzuki no houshoyaki, Japanese sea bass grilled in paper; Tai-meshi; Unnan no yakisaba, grilled mackerel – Unnan; Uzume-meshi, ingredients buried under rice with dashi poured overtop – Tsuwano; Wani no sashimi, shark meat sashimi; Yakimeshi ochazuke, grilled onigiri with kojoyu miso ochazuke
Shizuoka	Mishima ware, pottery – Mishima; Shitoro ware, pottery – Shimada; Suruga hina doll; Tatsu-guruma, wheeled dragon toy	Aojiro miso; Katsuobushi; Mikan; Sakura shrimp; Sencha; Strawberries; Wasabi	Abekawa mochi. mochi with kinako – Shizuoka; Fujinomiya yakisoba; Hamamatsu gyoza; Kuro hanpen; Shizuoka oden; Tatami iwashi; Tororo-jiru, grated Chinese yam soup; Unagi no kabayaki
Tochigi	Mashiko ware, pottery – Mashiko; Nikko-bori, woodcarving – Nikkō; Tenmyo-imono, cast iron – Sano; Yūki-tsumugi, silk – Oyama	Kanpyō; Strawberries; Yuba	Ashikaga shumai, meatless shumai – Banna-ji; Ayu udon; Ayumeshi, ayu cooked with rice; Chitake soba; Funa no kanro-ni, crucian carp simmered in soy sauce; Gyōza; Imo-kushi, roasted skewered small potatoes; Itoko-ni, adzuki with potatoes or pumpkin simmered in soy sauce and miso; Kenchin jiru, vegetable soup; Konnyaku, often homemade; Kanpyo no tamago-toji, soup made with kanpyō; Okkirikomi, hand cut udon noodles in a soy sauce or miso broth; Rakkyo-zuke, pickled rakkyo – Nikkō; Shimotsukare; Suiton; Tote-yaki, crepe-like pancake filled with sweet or savory ingredients – Shiobara Onsen
Tokushima	Awagami, washi; Ōtani ware, pottery – Naruto	Awabancha (阿波番茶), fermented tea; Buckwheat; Naruto kintoki, sweet potato; Sudachi; Suji aonori; Wasanbon	Iya soba, soba in iriko broth; Sobagome zosui, buckwheat porridge; Tarai udon, udon that is dipped in a sauce and then eaten; Tokushima ramen
Tokyo	Edo bekkō, tortoiseshell accessories; Edo kiriko (江戸切子), cut glass; Edo sashimono, wood joinery; Edo wazao, bamboo fishing rods; Honba kihachijo, dyed silk – Hachijō-jima; Imado doll; Inu-hariko and zaru-kaburi inu, papier-mâché dogs; Murayama oshima tsumugi, woven silk fabric – Musashimurayama; Tama ori, brocade; Tokyo antimony kogeihin, antimony craft; Tokyo ginki, silver craft	Ashitaba – Izu Islands; Naito togarashi; Tokyo shamo, chicken	Bettarazuke; Dojō nabe; Fukagawa-don or Fukugawa-meshi, clams and negi cooked in miso over rice; Kusaya – Nii-jima; Monjayaki; Shimazushi – Hachijo-jima; Tokyo Banana; Unadon; Yanagawa nabe, a nabemono dish of loach, burdock, and egg; Yokohama Baumkuchen
Tottori	Inshū-washi, paper; Yodoegasa, paper umbrella – Yodoe, Tottori	Daiei suika, watermelon – Hokuei; Daisen broccoli; Nashi; Sakyu rakkyo; Tottori wagyu; Snow crab	Gyūkotsu ramen, beef broth ramen; Horu soba; Kaniju, crab soup; Oyama okowa, steamed glutenous rice with vegetables; Tofu chikuwa
Toyama	Etchū Fukuoka sedge-woven hats; Etchu washi – Asahi, Yatsuo, Taira; Inami chokoku, woodcarving especially ranma – Inami; Shogawa hikimono kiji, zelkova wood bowls or trays; Takaoka Doki (高岡銅器), copperware – Takaoka; Takaoka shikki, lacquerware – Takaoka	Buri; Hakata banno negi, green onion; Hotaru ika; Kurocha, fermented tea; Shiro-ebi, white shrimp; Watermelon – Nyūzen	Buri shabu, amberjack shabu shabu; Masuzushi; Saiku kamaboko, decorative kamaboko; Sankaku dorayaki – Toyama (city); Toyama black ramen
Wakayama	Kīshū bina, lacquered doll; Kīshū lacquerware; Shuro tawashi; Yatagarasu Daruma, three-legged crow doll	Ginger; Jabara (citrus); Mikan; Umeboshi; Whale meat	Kagero, cream puff; Kue nabe; Kujira no tatsutaage, deep-fried whale meat; Meharizushi
Yamagata	Benibana-zome, safflower dyeing – Kahoku; Dantsu (山形緞通), woven wool carpets – Yamagata City; Fuku suzume, luck sparrows – Shinjō; Hirashimizu-yaki, pottery – Hirashimizu; Imono, cast iron ware – Yamagata City; Ita shishi (板獅子), lit. flat lions – Tsuruoka; Kaminoyama hariko (上山張子), papier mache dolls – Kaminoyama; Kasen-dako (花泉凧), kites – Yamagata City; Kokeshi; Neko ni tako, lit. "octopus on cat" doll; Otaka Poppo, toy hawk – Yonezawa; Sasano-bori (笹野彫り), Sasano woodcarvings – Yonezawa; Shogi koma, Japanese chess pieces – Murayama and Tendō; Tetsubin, cast iron kettle	Cherries; Common carp – Yonezawa; Pacific cod, especially dried; Pears; Yonezawa beef	Bo-dara ni, simmered dried Pacific cod, served at Obon; Dongara-jiru, cod soup; Hiyajiru, cold fish soup with mustard spinach, cabbage and cucumber; Hyo hoshi, Osechi side dish made from dried purslane simmered with dried soybeans, deep-fried tofu, fish sausage, and carrots; Imoni; Inago iri, locusts simmered in soy sauce and mirin; Karakara senbei, folded triangular sweet rice cracker with a toy inside; Kasu-jiru, radish, soybean, and sake lees soup often with salted salmon; Koi no umani (鯉の甘煮), carp simmered in salty-sweet soy sauce; Kujira-mochi, steamed sweetened rice cake; Masu no ankake, trout in thickened sauce; Niku soba, cold soba with chicken; Sansai nabe, mountain vegetable hotpot; Shonai soba; Tamago konyaku; Yamagata dashi (山形だし), chopped salsa-like condiment containing eggplant, cucumber, okra, myoga and shiso often served as a topping for cold tofu or somen; Yuza curry, vegetable curry – Yuza
Yamaguchi	Hagi ware, pottery; Kingyo Chōchin, goldfish lantern; Mishima Oni Yōzu, kite with oni face	Amanatsu; Black sesame; Fugu; Ice goby; Mishima beef; Uni	Itokoni (いとこ煮), boiled pumpkin with red beans; Iwakuni zushi, pressed sushi with lotus root and flaked fish; Kawara soba, soba served on a roof tile; Mikan nabe; Tsuki de hirotta tamago, castella cakes filled with custard
Yamanashi	Gemstone Jewelry; Koshu Inden, lacquered deer leather – Kōfu; Koshu oyako daruma, parent and child daruma doll – Kōfu; Kōshū Tebori Insho, hand-carved inkan or hanko seals – Kōfu and Fujiyoshida, Yamanashi	Koshu grape; Peaches	Azuki bōtō (小豆ぼうとう), red bean soup with hōtō noodles; Awabi no nigai, abalone steamed in soy sauce; Horse meat sashimi; Hōtō; Japanese wine; Kofu tori motsuni, stewed chicken offal – Kōfu; Koshu koumezuke, pickled small plum; Ozara, thick wheat noodles served cold; Shingen mochi – Fuefuki; Wild boar curry; Yamanashi croquette, croquette filled with hōtō, cheese, or other ingredients -Yamanashi, Yamanashi; Yoshida no udon – Fujiyoshida, Yamanashi

== In media ==
Meibutsu are key to the promotion of tourism within Japan, and have been frequently depicted in media since the Edo period (1603–1867).

=== Ukiyo-e ===
Meibutsu in ukiyo-e

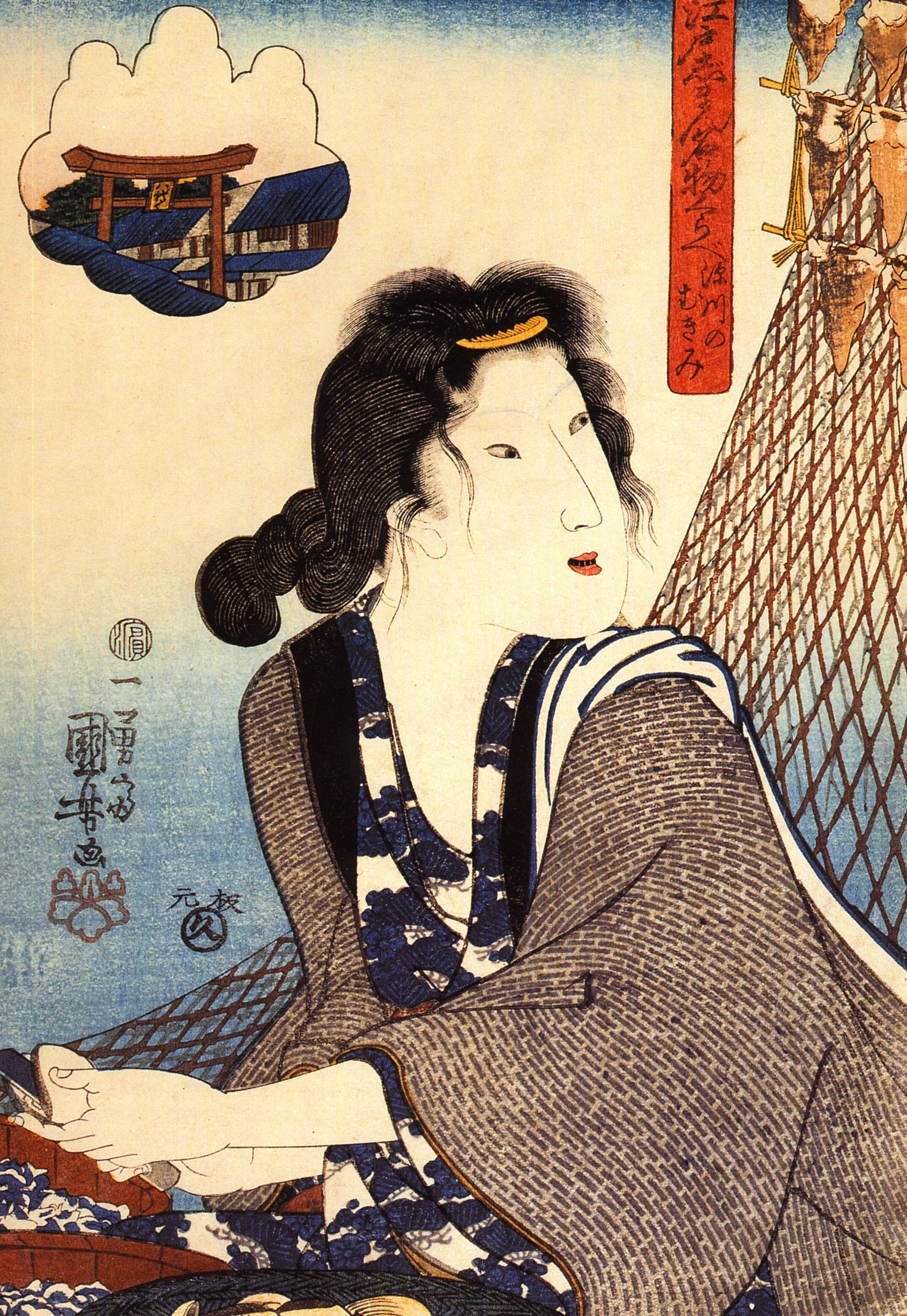
Bijin opening shellfish at Fukagawa by Utagawa Kuniyoshi

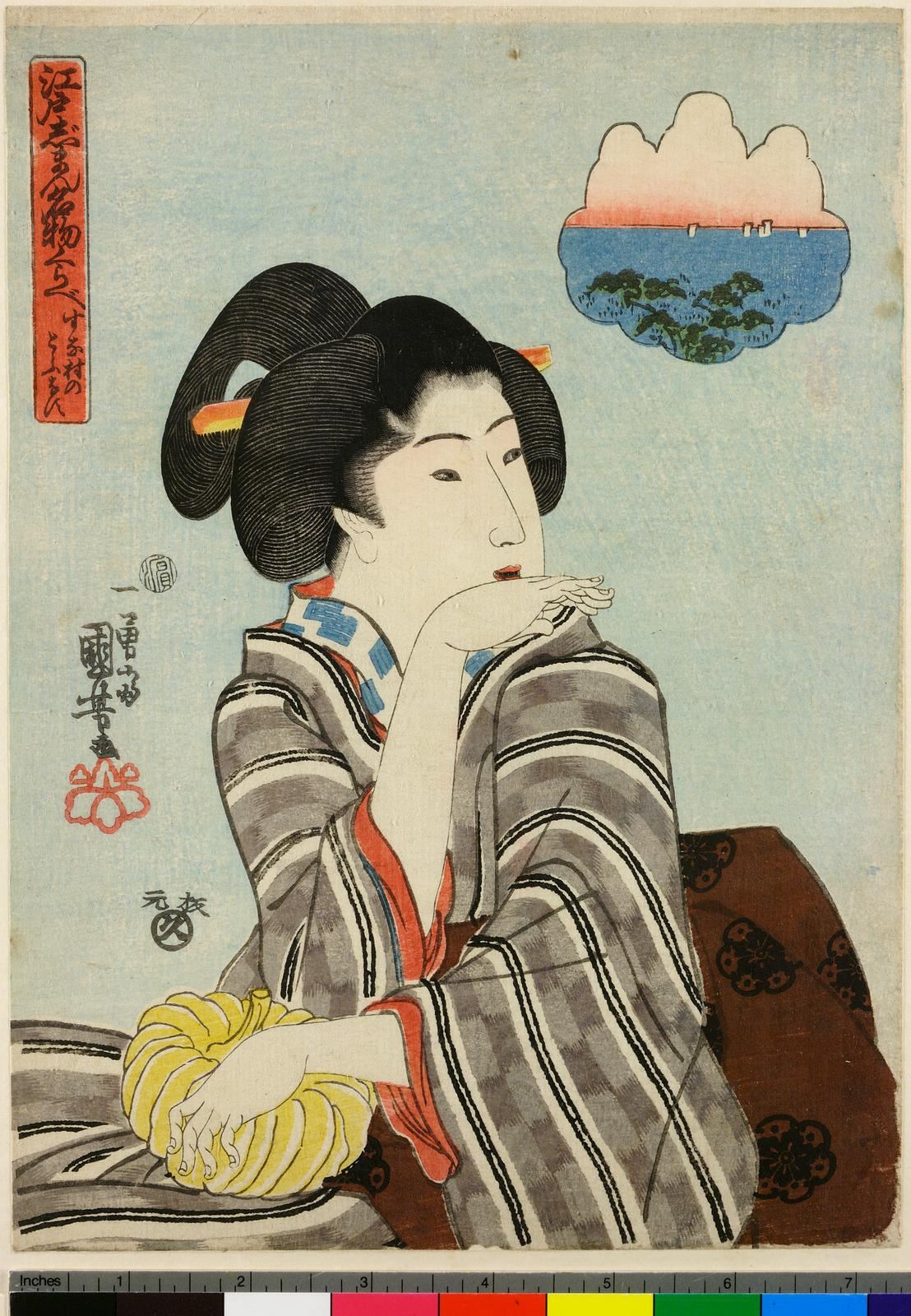
Bijin with pumpkin grown at Sunamura by Utagawa Kuniyoshi

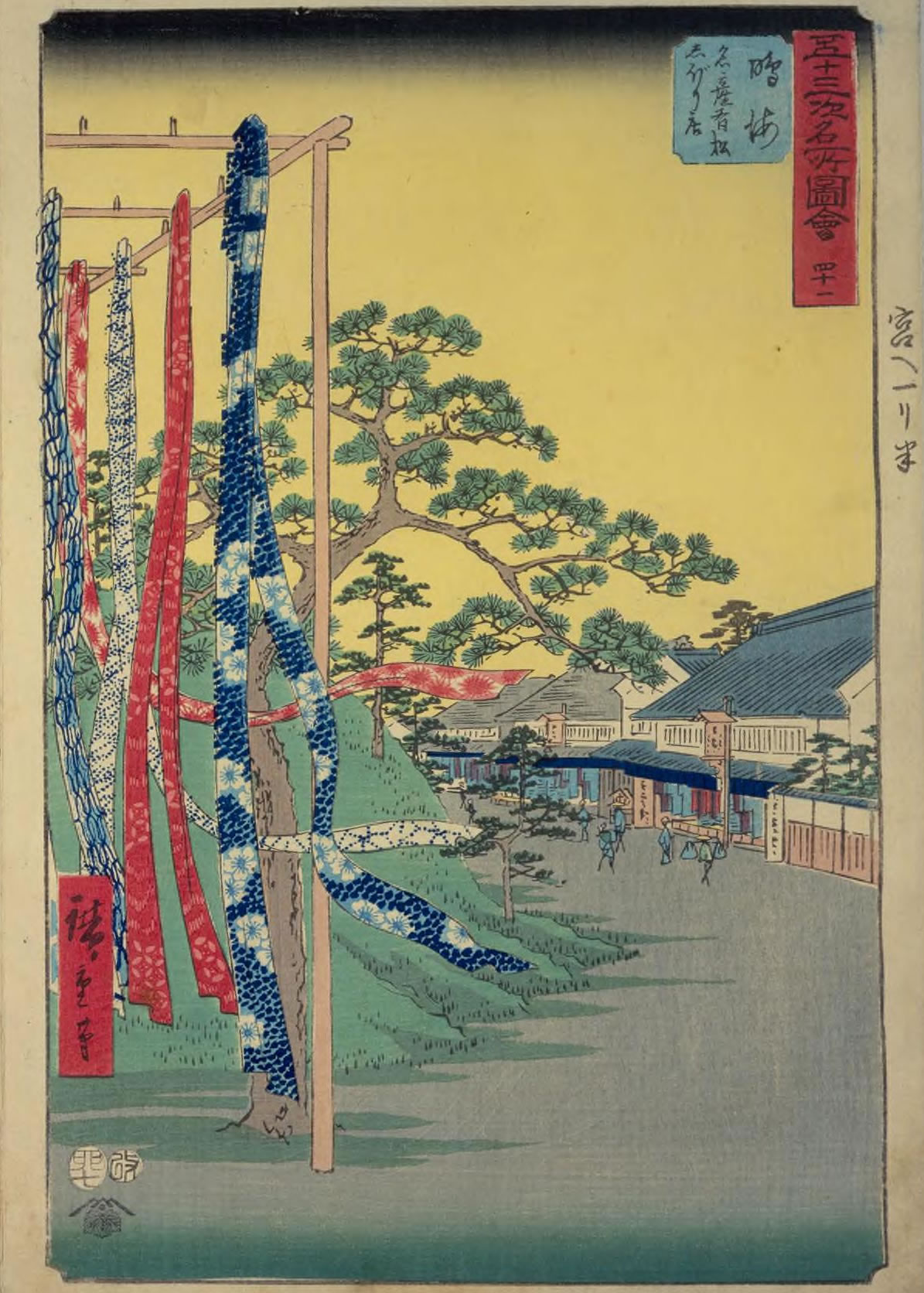
Narumi: Shop selling famous Arimatsu tie-dyed fabric by Hiroshige

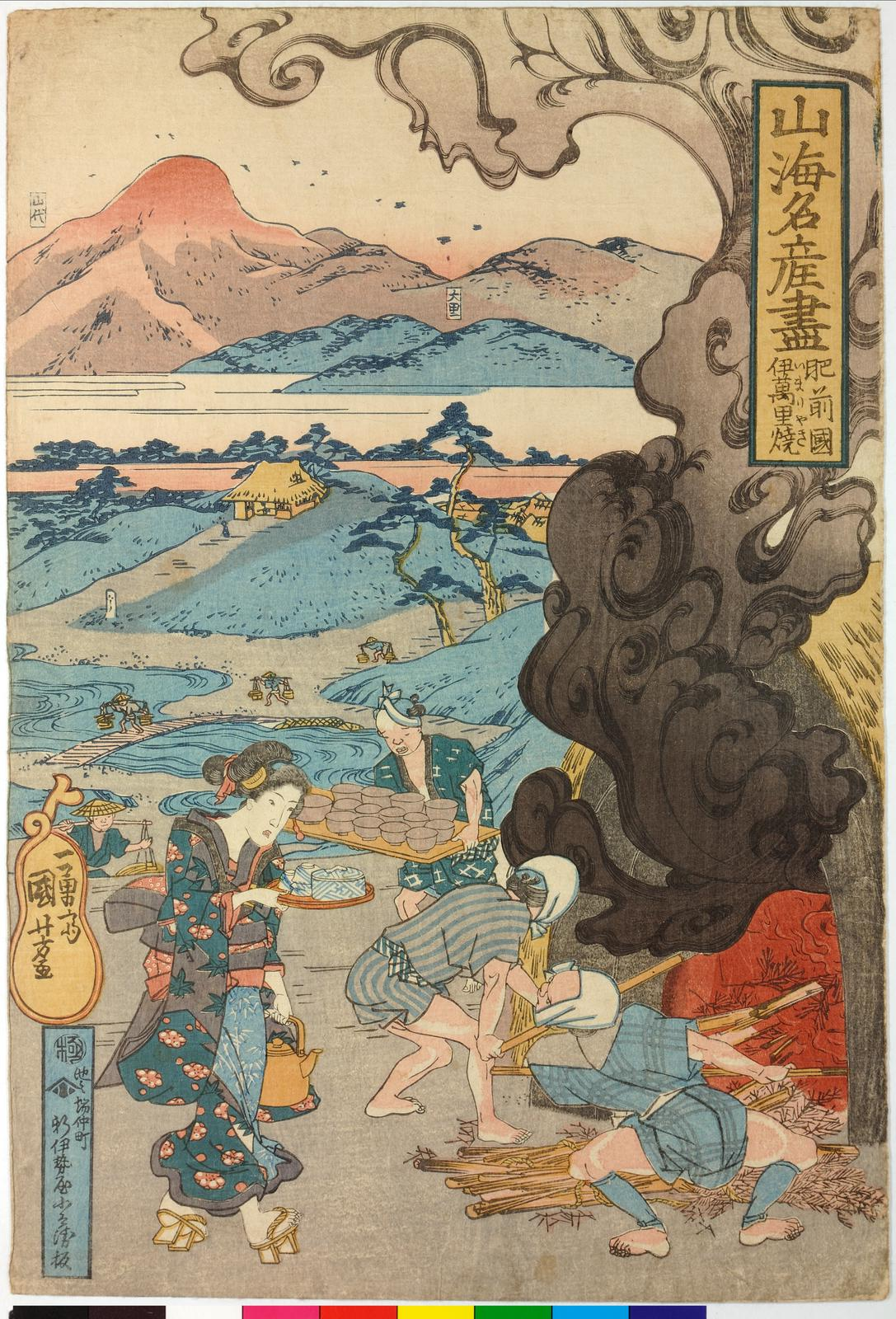
Imari ware kiln in Hizen Province by Utagawa Kuniyoshi

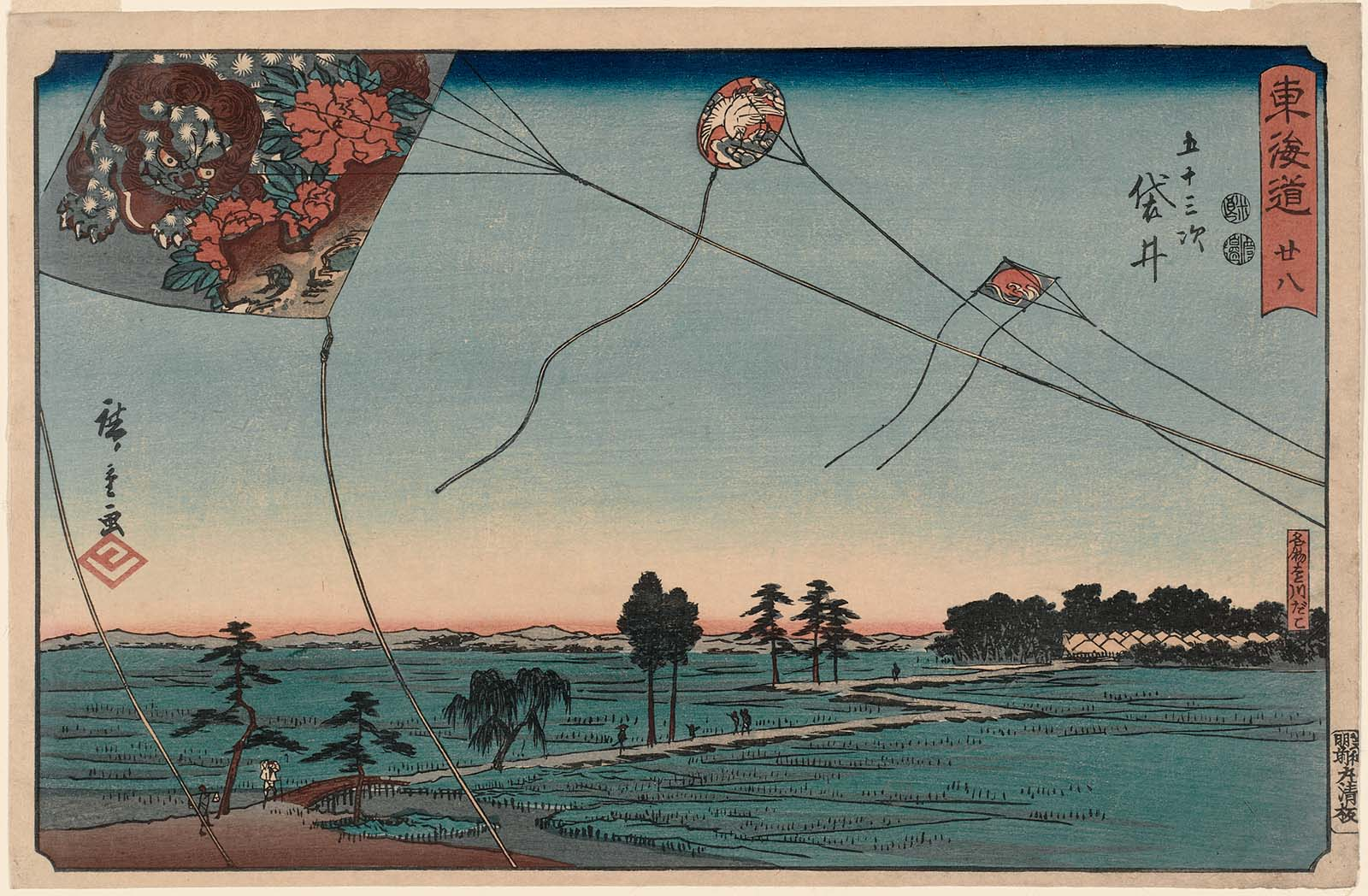
Fukuroi: famous kites of Tōtōmi Province by Hiroshige

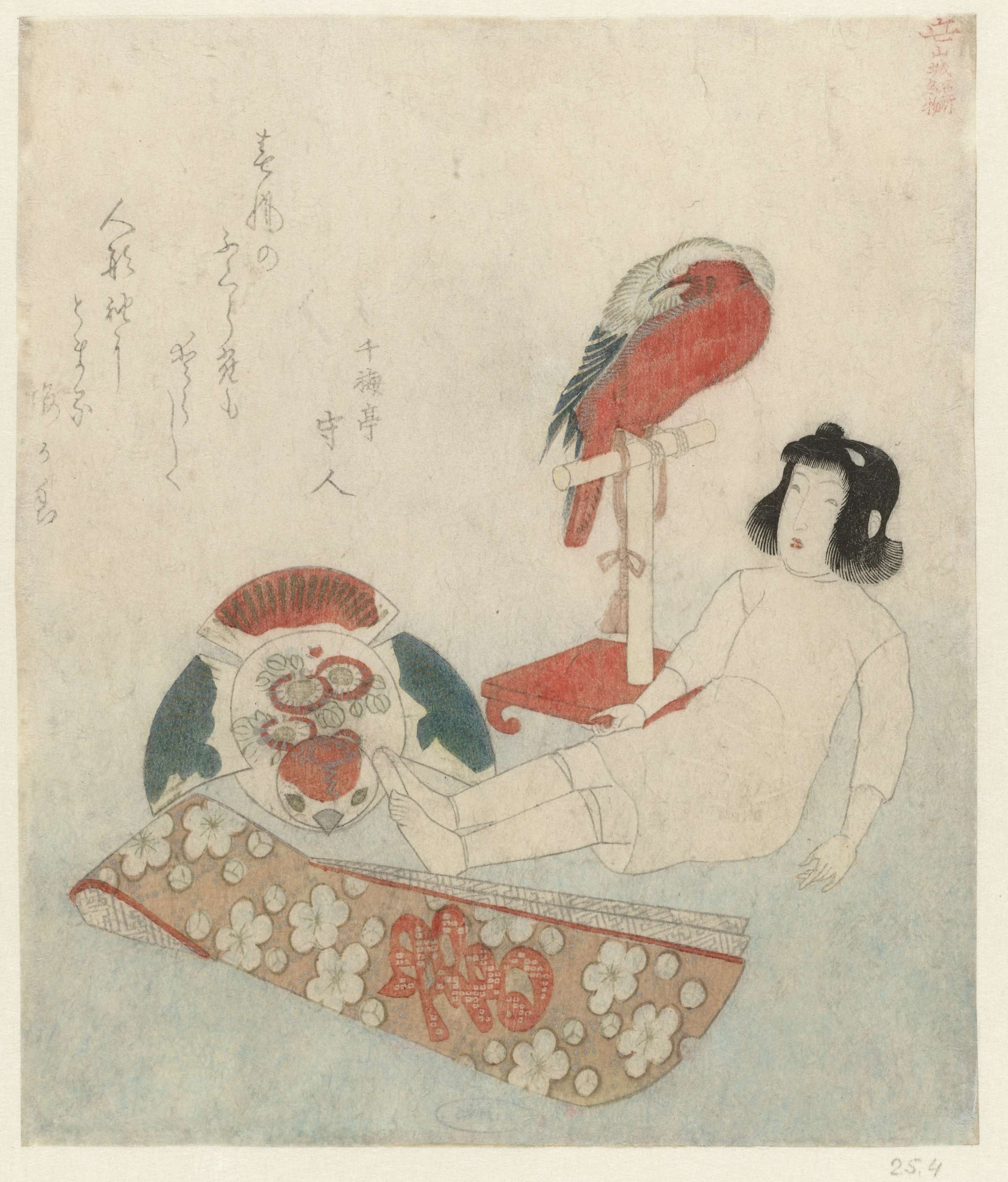
Famous products of Yamashiro Province by Keisai Eisen

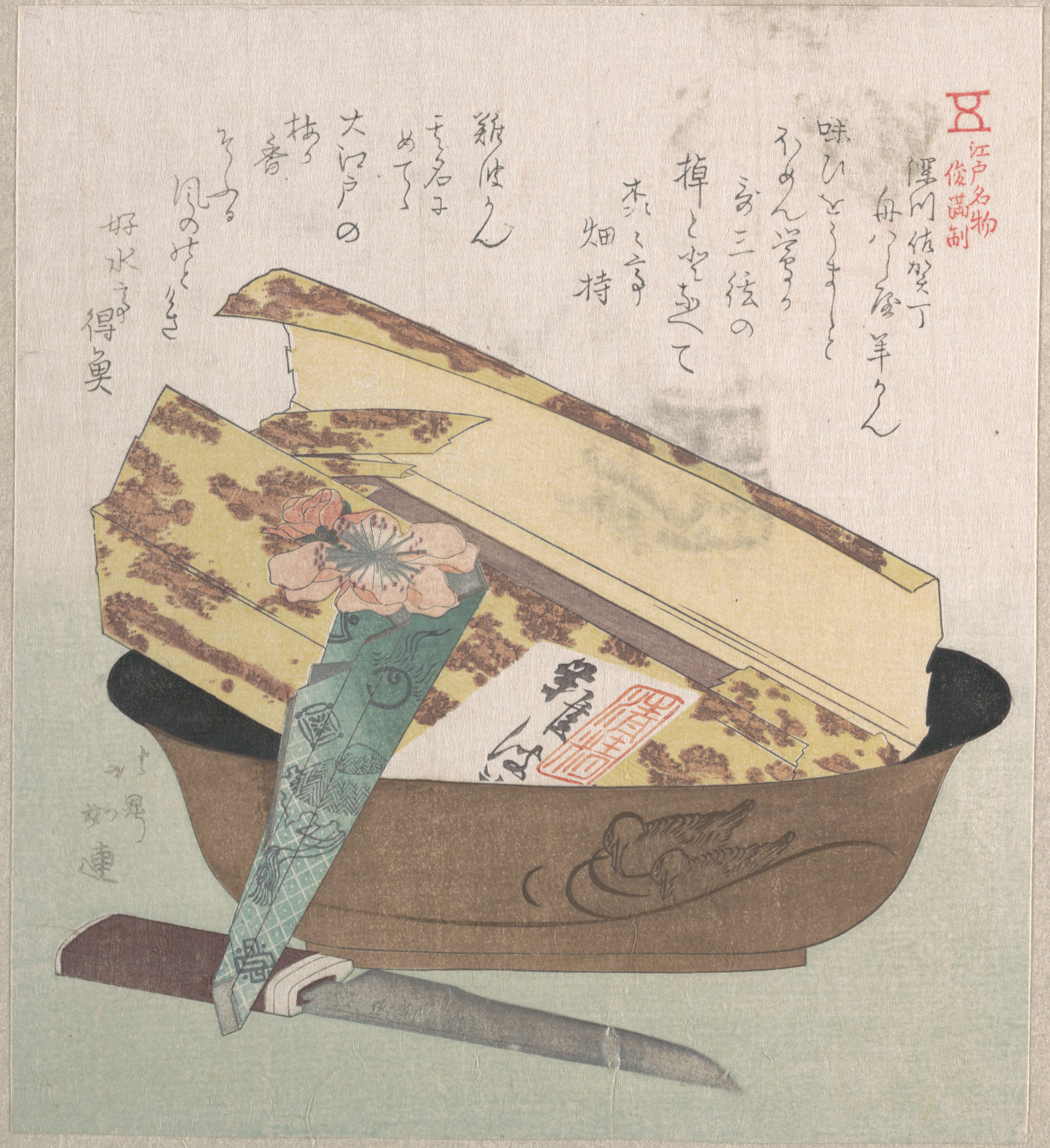
Famous product of Fukagawa, Tokyo, yokan by Hokucho Joren

=== Manga and Anime ===
- Ekiben Hitoritabi, food and travel manga about ekiben containing tokusanhin
- Golden Kamuy, a Seinen manga and anime that includes many Ainu meibutsu from Hokkaido including salmon and Ainu cuisine
- Ms. Koizumi Loves Ramen Noodles, a food manga and anime devoted to regional ramen
- Oishii Kamishama (Delicious Venus), a food manga devoted to presenting tokusanhin
- Oishinbo, a Seinen manga and anime that helped launch the gourmet anime genre occasionally featured meibutsu like hōtō or Fukugawa nabe and generally championed the idea of eating fresh, organic, and local
- Omae wa Mada Gunma o Shiranai, comedy manga and anime that presents some meibutsu of Gunma including himokawa udon, yakimanju, hoshi-imo (wind dried sweet potato), and miso pan
- Yakunara Mug Cup Mo, a manga and anime promoting Mino ware and other meibutsu of Tajimi, Gifu Prefecture
- Yatogame-chan Kansatsu Nikki, comedy manga and anime that presents some meibutsu of Nagoya

=== Television ===
- Japanese Style Originator – variety show that presents meibutsu and traditional craftsman as regular segments

== See also ==
- Japanese craft
- List of Traditional Crafts of Japan
- Meisho
- Miyagegashi
- Omiyage
- One Village One Product movement
- Tokusanhin
