= Kanpyō =

Kanpyō may refer to:

- Kanpyō (era) (寛平), a Japanese era spanning 889 and 898
- Kanpyō (food) (干瓢), a food found in Japanese cuisine
