= Nintama Rantarō season 2 =

Japanese anime series season

This is a list of the episodes from the second season of the anime series Nintama Rantarō.

== Episode list ==
No. overall	No. in season	Title	Original release date
48	1	"Ninja with a baby" Transliteration: "Komochi Ninja no Dan" (Japanese: 子持ち忍者の段)	3 October 1994
49	2	"I want a nap" Transliteration: "Hirune o Shitai no Dan" (Japanese: 昼寝をしたいの段)	4 October 1994
50	3	"The Mysterious moneychanger" Transliteration: "Nazo no Ryōgaeya no Dan" (Japanese: 謎の両替屋の段)	5 October 1994
51	4	"Class president is awesome" Transliteration: "Gakkyū Iinchō wa Erai no Dan" (Japanese: 学級委員長は偉いの段)	6 October 1994
52	5	"Shina Yamamoto-sensei's true identity" Transliteration: "Yamamoto Shina-sensei no Shōtai no Dan" (Japanese: 山本シナ先生の正体の段)	7 October 1994
53	6	"Super-class ninja" Transliteration: "Chōichiryū no Ninja no Dan" (Japanese: 超一流の忍者の段)	10 October 1994
54	7	"Who's the sharp-eyed one?" Transliteration: "Surudoi Me wa Dare Da? no Dan" (Japanese: 鋭い目は誰だ？の段)	11 October 1994
55	8	"Lucky Ninja"; Transliteration: "Tsuiteru Ninja no Dan" (Japanese: ツイてる忍者の段)	12 October 1994
56	9	"Hanabusa Makinosuke is never deterred" Transliteration: "Korinai Hanabusa Makinosuke no Dan" (Japanese: こりない花房牧之介の段)	13 October 1994
57	10	"Don't lose to the kunoichi" Transliteration: "Kunoichi ni Makeruna no Dan" (Japanese: くノ一に負けるなの段)	14 October 1994
58	11	"Follow-up lessons" Transliteration: "Hoshūjugyō no Dan" (Japanese: 補習授業の段)	17 October 1994
59	12	"What I taught" Transliteration: "Ore ga Oshieta no Dan" (Japanese: 俺が教えたの段)	18 October 1994
60	13	"It's the face that counts for a ninja" Transliteration: "Ninja wa Kao no Dan" (Japanese: 忍者は顔の段)	19 October 1994
61	14	"I love slimy" Transliteration: "Nurunur Daisuki no Dan" (Japanese: ヌルヌル大好きの段)	20 October 1994
62	15	"Kirimaru's test" Transliteration: "Kirimaru no Tesuto no Dan" (Japanese: きり丸のテストの段)	21 October 1994
63	16	"Wild weed salad" Transliteration: "Nogusa Sarada no Dan" (Japanese: 野草サラダの段)	24 October 1994
64	17	"Mount Uraura's co-op vice-president" Transliteration: "Uraura-yama no Fukukumiaichō no Dan" (Japanese: 裏々山の副組合長の段)	25 October 1994
65	18	"The all-there-is mushroom, is-that-all-there-is mushroom" Transliteration: "Arittake Korettake no Dan" (Japanese: ありっ茸これっ茸の段)	26 October 1994
66	19	"Principal runs away from home" Transliteration: "Gakuenchō no Iede no Dan" (Japanese: 学園長の家出の段)	27 October 1994
67	20	"The maiden's heart" Transliteration: "Otomegokoro no Dan" (Japanese: おとめ心の段)	28 October 1994
68	21	"Anniversary of the school's founding" Transliteration: "Kaikōkinenbi no Dan" (Japanese: 開校記念日の段)	30 October 1994
69	22	"Inside of the Jar"; Transliteration: "Tsubo no Nakami no Dan" (Japanese: 壷の中身の段)	1 November 1994
70	23	"Who's the culprit?" Transliteration: "Hannin wa Dare? no Dan" (Japanese: 犯人は誰？の段)	2 November 1994
71	24	"Changing jobs" Transliteration: "Tenshoku no Dan" (Japanese: 転職の段)	3 November 1994
72	25	"The Diary gone missing" Transliteration: "Nakunatta Nikki no Dan" (Japanese: なくなった日記の段)	4 November 1994
73	26	"The Mysterious sutra mound" Transliteration: "Nazo no Kyōzuka no Dan" (Japanese: 謎の経塚の段)	7 November 1994
74	27	"300-year-old ancestor" Transliteration: "Sambyakunen Mae no Senzo no Dan" (Japanese: 三百年前の先祖の段)	8 November 1994
75	28	"Yamada-sensei gets angry" Transliteration: "Yamada-sensei Okoru no Dan" (Japanese: 山田先生怒るの段)	9 November 1994
76	29	"I Love Disguises!"; Transliteration: "Hensō Daisuki no Dan" (Japanese: 変装大好きの段)	10 November 1994
77	30	"The Do-or-die diet" Transliteration: "Kesshi no Daietto no Dan" (Japanese: 決死のダイエットの段)	11 November 1994
78	31	"Bandit's Lost Goods"; Transliteration: "Sanzoku no Otoshimono no Dan" (Japanese: 山賊の落とし物の段)	14 November 1994
79	32	"Kōchamaru and the Cookie"; Transliteration: "Kōchamaru to Kukkii no Dan" (Japanese: 高茶丸とクッキー太郎の段)	15 November 1994
80	33	"The Kakuzatō band" Transliteration: "Kakuzatō no Dan" (Japanese: 各座党の段)	16 November 1994
81	34	"Shadō-Sensei"; Transliteration: "Shadō-sensei no Dan" (Japanese: 斜堂先生の段)	17 November 1994
82	35	"Frequent Challenger Makinosuke!"; Transliteration: "Saisai Chōsen! Makinosuke no Dan" (Japanese: 再々挑戦！牧之介の段)	18 November 1994
83	36	"Beware of fire (Note: Hi no yōjin (火の用心, "Beware of fire") is the stock phrase shouted by people on fire patrol at night.)" Transliteration: "Hi no Yōjin no Dan" (Japanese: 火の用心の段)	21 November 1994
84	37	"Fraid of fire" Transliteration: "Hi ga Kowai no Dan" (Japanese: 火が怖いの段)	22 November 1994
85	38	"Fire! Fire!"; Transliteration: "Kaji daa! no Dan" (Japanese: 火事だあ！の段)	23 November 1994
86	39	"Not ninja material" Transliteration: "Ninja ni Mukanai no Dan" (Japanese: 忍者にむかないの段)	24 November 1994
87	40	"Overcome stage fright!" Transliteration: "Agari shō o Naose! no Dan" (Japanese: 上がり性をなおせ！の段)	25 November 1994
88	41	"Danzō is gone" Transliteration: "Danzou ga Inai no Dan" (Japanese: 団蔵がいないの段)	28 November 1994
89	42	"Danzō's daddy" Transliteration: "Danzō no Tōchan no Dan" (Japanese: 団蔵の父ちゃんの段)	29 November 1994
90	43	"Yokoyari Irejūrō"; Transliteration: "Yokoyari Nyuu Jūrō" (Japanese: 横槍入十郎の段)	30 November 1994
91	44	"Shinbē's papa is here" Transliteration: "Shinbē no Papa ga Kita no Dan" (Japanese: しんべヱのパパが来たの段)	1 December 1994
92	45	"Pursue the ice thief" Transliteration: "Kōri dorobō o Oe no Dan" (Japanese: 氷泥棒を追えの段)	2 December 1994
93	46	"Password loathing" Transliteration: "Aikotoba nanka Daikirai no Dan" (Japanese: 合い言葉なんか大嫌いの段)	5 December 1994
94	47	"Happōsai's aim" Transliteration: "Happōsai no Nerai no Dan" (Japanese: 八方斎の狙いの段)	6 December 1994
95	48	"Kirimaru imperiled" Transliteration: "Kiri-chan Ayaushi no Dan" (Japanese: きりちゃん危うしの段)	7 December 1994
96	49	"Takiyashamaru-senpai"; Transliteration: "Takiyashamaru Senpai no Dan" (Japanese: 滝夜叉丸先輩の段)	8 December 1994
97	50	"Very Accurate Fortune-Telling"; Transliteration: "Yoku Ataru Uranai no Dan" (Japanese: よく当たる占いの段)	9 December 1994
98	51	"Man with the Bad Shave"; Transliteration: "Higezori ga Heta na Otoko no Dan" (Japanese: ヒゲ剃りが下手な男の段)	12 December 1994
99	52	"First-Year vs. Second-Year"; Transliteration: "Ichinensei Tai Ninensei no Dan" (Japanese: 一年生対二年生の段)	13 December 1994
100	53	"The Fight Against Weakness"; Transliteration: "Nigate to Tatakae no Dan" (Japanese: 苦手と戦えの段)	14 December 1994
101	54	"Shinbei's Cold"; Transliteration: "Shinbei no Kaze no Dan" (Japanese: しんべヱの風邪の段)	15 December 1994
102	55	"A silly fight" Transliteration: "Komatta Kenka no Dan" (Japanese: 困った喧嘩の段)	16 December 1994
103	56	"Daisankyōei-maru's New Year's gift" Transliteration: "Daisankyōeimaru no Oseibo no Dan" (Japanese: 第三協栄丸のお歳暮の段)	19 December 1994
104	57	"Mysterious accident" Transliteration: "Nazo no jiko no dan" (Japanese: 謎の事故の段)	20 December 1994
105	58	"The Sad bandit" Transliteration: "Kanashiki sanzoku no dan" (Japanese: 哀しき山賊の段)	21 December 1994
106	59	"Top secret memo" Transliteration: "Maruhi memo no dan" (Japanese: マル秘メモの段)	22 December 1994
107	60	"New teacher" Transliteration: "Atarashii sensei" (Japanese: 新しい先生の段)	23 December 1994
108	61	"Grand year-end house-cleaning" Transliteration: "Ōsoji no dan" (Japanese: 大掃除の段)	26 December 1994
109	62	"Winter break" Transliteration: "Fuyuyasumi no dan" (Japanese: 冬休みの段)	27 December 1994
110	63	"The real ninjutsu" Transliteration: "Honto no ninjutsu no dan" (Japanese: ホントの忍術の段)	28 December 1994
111	64	"Mochi-pounding"; Transliteration: "Mochitsuki no dan" (Japanese: もちつきの段)	29 December 1994
112	65	"Ishikawa Gojūemon"; Transliteration: "Ishikawa Gojūemon no dan" (Japanese: 石川五十ヱ門の段)	30 December 1994
113	66	"Kite-flying tournament" Transliteration: "Takoage taikai no dan" (Japanese: 凧上げ大会の段)	4 January 1995
114	67	"Can't go home" Transliteration: "Kaerenai no dan" (Japanese: 帰れないの段)	5 January 1995
115	68	"Yummy boiled octopus" Transliteration: "Oishii yudedako no dan" (Japanese: おいしい茹でダコの段)	6 January 1995
116	69	"It's New Year's and already at it?" Transliteration: "Oshōgatsu sōsō no dan" (Japanese: お正月そうそうの段)	9 January 1995
117	70	"Takeuma master" Transliteration: "Takeuma meijin no dan" (Japanese: 竹馬名人の段)	10 January 1995
118	71	"Ninjutsu whiz-girl" Transliteration: "Tensai ninja shōjo no dan" (Japanese: 天才忍術少女の段)	11 February 1995
119	72	"Emergency staff meeting" Transliteration: "Kinkyū shokuin kaigi no dan" (Japanese: 緊急職員会議の段)	13 February 1995
120	73	"Collection"; Transliteration: "Korekushon no dan" (Japanese: コレクションの段)	14 February 1995
121	74	"Snow is falling" Transliteration: "Yuki ga furu no dan" (Japanese: 雪が降るの段)	15 February 1995
122	75	"Wrong person" Transliteration: "Hitochigai no dan" (Japanese: 人ちがいの段)	18 February 1995
123	76	"Father's employment" Transliteration: "Chichiue no shūshoku" (Japanese: 父上の就職の段)	19 February 1995
124	77	"Sunrise"; Transliteration: "Hinode no dan" (Japanese: 日の出の段)	25 February 1995
125	78	"Two birds with one stone" Transliteration: "Isseki nichō no dan" (Japanese: 一石二鳥の段)	1 March 1995
126	79	"I just love rakkyō scallions" Transliteration: "Rakkyō daisuki" (Japanese: ラッキョウ大好きの段)	2 March 1995
127	80	"Hurry to Kinrakuji temple" Transliteration: "Kinrakuji e isoge no dan" (Japanese: 金楽寺へ急げの段)	6 March 1995
128	81	"The flight jutsu technique" Transliteration: "Hikō no jutsu no dan" (Japanese: 飛行の術の段)	7 March 1995
129	82	"Scolded"; Transliteration: "Shikararete no dan" (Japanese: 叱られての段)	8 March 1995
130	83	"Shinbē's morning hair" Transliteration: "Shinbē no neguse no dan" (Japanese: しんべヱの寝ぐせの段)	9 March 1995
131	84	"Hemu-Hemu's blunder" Transliteration: "Hemuhemu shippai no dan" (Japanese: ヘムヘム失敗の段)	10 March 1995
132	85	"Hemu-Hemu's barking" Transliteration: "Hemuhemu no nakigoe no dan" (Japanese: ヘムヘムの鳴き声の段)	8 April 1995
133	86	"Ninja's secret scroll" Transliteration: "Ninja hidensho no dan" (Japanese: 忍術秘伝書の段)	9 April 1995
134	87	"Mister bandit's generosity" Transliteration: "Sanzaku san no gokōi no dan" (Japanese: 山賊さんのご好意の段)	13 April 1995
135	88	"Learn the body movement by drill" Transliteration: "Karada de oboeru no dan" (Japanese: 体で覚えるの段)	14 April 1995
136	89	"Matsutake Castle's young lord" Transliteration: "Matsutakejō no wakasama no dan" (Japanese: マツタケ城の若様の段)	19 April 1995
137	90	"Thee are two young lords" Transliteration: "Wakasama ga futari no dan" (Japanese: 若様が二人の段)	20 April 1995
138	91	"Shizukadake"; Transliteration: "Shizukadake no dan" (Japanese: シズカダケの段)	29 April 1995
139	92	"Abominable snowman who can't stand the cold" Transliteration: "Samugari no yukiotoko no dan" (Japanese: 寒がりの雪男の段)	30 April 1995
140	93	"Smiley face is important" Transliteration: "Egao ga daiji no dan" (Japanese: 笑顔が大事の段)	5 May 1995
141	94	"Daisankyōei-maru's nuisance" Transliteration: "Daisankyōeimaru no meiwaku no dan" (Japanese: 第三協栄丸の迷惑の段)	6 May 1995
142	95	"The pirates enemies are who?" Transliteration: "Kaizoku no teki wa? no dan" (Japanese: 海賊の敵は？の段)	20 May 1995
143	96	"Bait for Sazaemon"; Transliteration: "Sazaemon no esa no dan" (Japanese: サザエ門のエサの段)	25 May 1995
144	97	"A flabberghasting challenge" Transliteration: "Akireta chōsen no dan" (Japanese: 呆れた挑戦の段)	26 May 1995
145	98	"Fine and well!" Transliteration: "Genki desu! no dan" (Japanese: 元気です！の段)	1 June 1995
146	99	"Graffiti"; Transliteration: "Itazura gaki no dan" (Japanese: いたずら書きの段)	2 June 1995
147	100	"Happōsai's scheming" Transliteration: "Happōsai no takurami" (Japanese: 八方斎の企みの段)	3 June 1995
148	101	"Happōsai undone" Transliteration: "Komatta Happōsai no dan" (Japanese: 困った八方斎の段)	4 June 1995
149	102	"Toothache"; Transliteration: "Ha ga itai no dan" (Japanese: 歯が痛いの段)	7 June 1995
150	103	"Ninjutsu Academy visiting tour" Transliteration: "Ninjutsu Gakuen kengaku no dan" (Japanese: 忍術学園見学の段)	14 June 1995
151	104	"What about Hatsutake Castle?"; Transliteration: "Hatsutakejō wa? no dan" (Japanese: ハツタケ城は？の段)	21 June 1995
152	105	"A bored samurai lord" Transliteration: "Taikutsu na tonosama no dan" (Japanese: 退屈な殿様の段)	28 June 1995
153	106	"Reverse and opposite" Transliteration: "Abekobe hantai no dan" (Japanese: あべこべ反対の段)	29 June 1995
154	107	"Helpful Buddhist statue" Transliteration: "Arigatai butsuzō no dan" (Japanese: ありがたい仏像の段)	6 July 1995
155	108	"Let's make up" Transliteration: "Nakanaori shitai no dan" (Japanese: 仲直りしたいの段)	13 July 1995
156	109	"Unkokusai the conjurer" Transliteration: "Genjutsu tsukai Unkokusai no dan" (Japanese: 幻術使い雲黒斎の段)	20 July 1995
157	110	"Don't look at the right hand" Transliteration: "Migite o miruna" (Japanese: 右手を見るなの段)	27 July 1995
158	111	"Rikichi's plan" Transliteration: "Rikichi no sakusen no dan" (Japanese: 利吉の作戦の段)	August 3, 1995
159	112	"Pop training drill" Transliteration: "Nukiuchi kunren no dan" (Japanese: 抜き打ち訓練の段)	4 August 1995
160	113	"Kirimaru's secret" Transliteration: "Kirimaru no himitsu no dan" (Japanese: きり丸の秘密の段)	10 August 1995
161	114	"Nannosono Koreshiki"; Transliteration: "Nannosono Koreshiki no dan" (Japanese: 南野園是式の段)	19 August 1995
162	115	"Daredarō"; Transliteration: "Daredarō no dan" (Japanese: 駄礼田郎の段)	TBA
163	116	"The Sleeping fire jutsu technique" Transliteration: "Nemuribi no jutsu no dan" (Japanese: 眠り火の術の段)	TBA
164	117	"The Firefly's glow jutsu technique" Transliteration: "Hotarubi no jutsu no dan" (Japanese: 蛍火の術の段)	TBA
165	118	"The dangerous jutsu technique" Transliteration: "Kiken na jutsu no dan" (Japanese: 危険な術の段)	TBA
166	119	"Half-price sale" Transliteration: "Hangaku sēru no dan" (Japanese: 半額セールの段)	TBA
167	120	"Fireworks"; Transliteration: "Uchiage hanabi no dan" (Japanese: 打ち上げ花火の段)	TBA
