= Anchi ware =

Type of Japanese pottery

Anchi ware (庵地焼) is a type of Japanese pottery traditionally made in Agano, Niigata prefecture.
