= Tatami iwashi =

Japanese dried fish snack

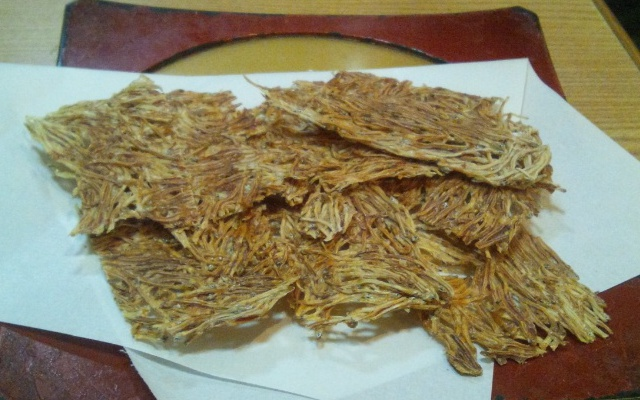
- Baked tatami iwashi
- Place of origin: Japan
- Main ingredients: Baby sardines

Tatami iwashi (畳鰯/たたみいわし) or tatami shirasu (たたみしらす) is a Japanese processed food made by drying baby sardines or anchovies (called shirasu, 白子 / しらす) into rectangular sheets. (Note: Sheets like dried nori)

Tatami iwashi are served after first lightly toasting the sheet. It is a well-known snack (sake-no-sakana) eaten as an accompaniment to sake or beer drinking, as well as a local specialty of the coastal areas of Shizuoka Prefecture and Kanagawa Prefecture (Ōiso).

== Etymology ==
This food item is named for its resemblance to a straw tatami mat common in traditional Japanese-style rooms or houses, according to one theory. An alternate explanation is that the product was made by drying out on sunoko made of the common rush (igusa), which is the same fiber that tatami mats are woven from.

== Manufacture ==
The shirasu (juvenile anchovies (Note: The common term for anchovies in Japan is katakuchi iwashi or literally "hard-mouthed sardine", so it is considered name-wise a type of sardine. This is further complicated by variant names, so that the tatami iwashi is described as made from seguro iwashi (anchovies), or from hishiko iwashi (local term for anchovies).)) to be used are selected, so that fresh, medium-thin and less fatty fry about 1 to 2 cm (0.39 to 0.79 in) are selected.

The raw shirasu get laid out thinly on the sieve screen lining of their framed molds (Note: Or on bamboo sunoko, or just su (簀), similar to something for making nori or paper.) (while submerged in water tanks) and after the moisture drips off to retain shape, the semi-dried sheets are laid out an unrolled rush mat (sudare) and sun-dried (or placed through various mechanical means of drying (Note: More specifically suboshi (素干し; 'plain dried') which refers to drying something as is and untreated, as opposed to salting and drying.)), peeling them off once well-dried.

The process is evocative of traditional Japanese paper-making, and similar to that craft, laying the small fish evenly on the sieve requires mastery of technique.

If the fish are not of paramount freshness, the fish will sag and the sheets flatten, and will not form the textured sheets characteristic of prime-quality tatami iwashi. Also attempting to press pre-cooked kamaage shirasu (aka chirimen jako) into sheets will not work.

Formerly these were made A4 paper size, (Note: Size slightly narrower and taller than letter size paper) but nowadays they are mostly postcard-sized. (Note: A sheet may contain hundreds or even a thousand small fry, according to one source.)

== Uses ==
Breakdown of nutrients in tatami iwashi (2010 study)
1. Protein (75.1%)
2. Water (10.7%)
3. Fats (5.60%)
4. Other (8.60%)

Since ordinary tatami iwashi is not flavored, toasting the sheet over a flame (or in a toaster oven) and sprinkling some soy sauce on top is a standard way to serve it. (Note: The Shizuoka Research Institute of Fishery suggests pouring hot water and adding soy sauce for a soup, crumbling to small pieces and dripping soy sauce, and using butter, but does not indicate how common this way of serving is.)

The tatami iwashi may be refrigerated or otherwise cooled for a longer shelf life.

According to the Standard Tables of Food Composition in Japan for the year 2010, tatami iwashi contains 75% protein.

Japan's Food Labeling Act has categorized tatami iwashi as "processed seafoods".

A 2022 survey by Japan's National Institute of Health and Nutrition from a randomly selected pool of citizens 1 year or older found that the Japanese consumed on average 0.977g of shirasu per day, versus only 0.001g of tatami iwashi during the month of November.

== History ==
The haikai literary theory work Kefukigusa completed 1638 (published 1645) mentions the tatami iwashi as a specialty product of Iyo Province (now Ehime Prefecture) which used fish netted locally in Uwajima. (Note: The dictionary Nihon Kokugo Daijiten, 2nd ed. lists this as the oldest example of usage of the term.)

The culinary work Ryōri monogatari of 1643 also writes that tatami iwashi is good for sakana (drinking snack) (Note: The Kan'ei 13/1663 copy written mostly in kana, it reads "〇同たたみいはしさかなによし" or "tatami iwashi is good for sakana".) (Note: Kawakami writes in modern form with kanji that "鰯が酒の肴に良いことが述べられている", so it is clear "sakana (肴)" in the sense of "snack" is meant, and not "sakana (魚)" in the sense of "fish".)

Another culinary work Ryōri mugonshō written c. 1729 by Kaga Domain kitchen official Funaki Dennai (舟木伝内) describes the tatami iwashi as a product made by placing baby anchovies about 1 inch (1 sun) in length into molds about 5 to 6 inches square, then drying them out into rectangles like funori (Gloiopeltis) seaweed. That when it is browned after flaming it, it makes excellent snack for drinking. (Note: Japanese: "一寸（ばかり）の子鰯を五寸から六寸四方にフノリの如く四角に干したるものなり。色付焼の取肴に用ゆ可（べ）し、一段（ダン）によし".) The author remarks this type product was recently becoming available in the area near him (i.e., the vicinity of Kanazawa in present-day Ishikawa Prefecture).

The Kansei bukan (寛政武鑑) of 1789 records that tatami iwashi was given as New Year's tribute to the shogunate by the Ueda Domain of Shinano. (Note: Shinano is actually landlocked.)

The Ryōri hayashinan (料理早指南) (early 19th cent.) states, under the category of dried food cooking, that the tatami iwashi is the dry form of fish called shirasu, and the same book also mentioned tatami sayori (halfbeak) and tatami hishiko (alias for anchovies). Around the same period, the comedic work Tōkaidōchū Hizakurige included an episode in Seto, Suruga Province where there is spoken the line "By the way, what is this soup? Is it tatami iwashi done Senba-ni style?".

Scholar Ono Ranzan's 1847 revised edition of the Honzō Kōmoku Keimō (本草綱目啓蒙; "Dictated Compendium of Materia Medica") writes that "[the fish] fashioned into thin sheets and dried are called shirasu-boshi or tatami iwashi in Edo.".

In the late Edo Period, a ranking of okazu dishes entitled Hibi tokuyō kenyaku ryōri sumō torikumi (日々徳用倹約料理角力取組; "Daily sumo matches of bargain thrifty cooking") was published with mezashi iwashi ranked ōzeki champion and tatami iwashi ranked near the upper echelon as maegashira 3-maime.

The production of tatatmi iwashi increased greatly starting in the Meiji Period after the shogunate. Although they were first being made around the country for self-consumption, dedicated specialist manufacturers began to appear in coastal Kanagawa Prefecture from Shōnan to the Miura Peninsula, leading to further large-scale production around the Mochimune Harbor of Shizuoka and in Kanagawa.

In 1874, Tokyo Prefecture issued a memoranda to the head of each ward dictating the limits to the amount of food that can be brought in for prisoners, so that only up to 50 sheets of tatami iwashi were allowed.

Shigejirō Okumura's 1905 title Katei wayō ryōrihō (家庭和洋料理法; "Methods of home-style Japanese and Western cooking") writes that tatami iwashi are commonly eaten by brushing with soy sauce and roasting, or by immersing in water for 2, 3 days until softened then using it in soups.

Offerings of it has been made to the Tsurugaoka Hachimangū since olden times.

== Mentions by notable people ==
Tokimura Michi, who was daughter-in-law to Bakin and acted as scribe for his diary, continued to write her own diary in the 1850s entitled Michijo nikkifs (路女日記). The tatami iwashi appears twice on the menu during 5 years of meal-taking.

Novelist Jun'ichirō Tanizaki in the 1934 work Tōkyō o omou (東京をおもふ; "Reflecting on Tokyo") wrote "I see the reason why [Tokyo]'s specialty dishes are such things as funa-no-suzumeyaki (crucian carp grilled), Asakusa nori, and tatami iwashi. Before the Earthquake, Tokyo was said to be a village not a city, and even still now after the Quake, it is still a countrified place, in a way". The Chines prose writer Zhou Zuoren who had studied abroad in Japan for some years read this remark and gave his opinion that "Jun'ichirō Tanizaki clarified the frailty, poverty, lack of affluence, and shabbiness of the foods of Tokyo".

== Works that mention ==
- Natsume Sōseki's Eijitsu shōhin (1909 essay collection) includes the piece Yamadori (山鳥) in which scene, chrysanthemum flowers pressed into a thin wafer is eaten as "shōjin-style tatami iwashi".
- Shūsei Tokuda's 1911 novel Kabi ("Mold")
- Mori Ōgai's 1816 biographical novel Shibue Chūsai where the title character is described as having a liking for tatami iwashi
- Osamu Dazai's 1948 novel No Longer Human: "I didn't answer bu picked up a sheet of dried sardines, looked into the silver eyes of the little fish and felt a wave of drunken nostalgia.."
- Noriko Hamaguchi's manga series Sake to tatami iwashi no hibi ran from 1995 to 2000.

== See also ==
- List of dried foods
