= Yubeshi =

Japanese confection

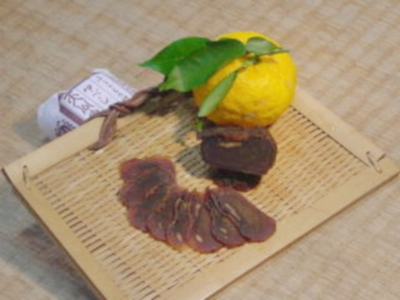
- Type: Wagashi
- Place of origin: Japan
- Main ingredients: Sticky rice or rice flour, sugar and soy sauce; Walnuts or Japanese citrus (usually yuzu)

Yubeshi (Japanese: ゆべし) is a type of wagashi (Japanese confection). It has several flavour and shape variations. Two main types include a rectangular walnut and soy sauce flavoured mochi-like confectionery and a second one is a round stuffed yuzu rind variation, sometimes called Maru-yubeshi (round yubeshi) and originally developed as a ration and cherished for their long shelf life. Many regions have their own distinct recipes, most yubeshi has a base of sticky rice flour or regular rice flour, sugar and walnuts and flavoured with soy sauce or miso. Some regions may add spices such as ginger, sansho pepper, white pepper, chilli pepper, and recipe variations may include sesame oil or sesame seeds. The process of production is very labor-intensive. A circle is cut out of the top of the yuzu and set aside. A wooden spatula removes the fruit and scrapes away the white pith of the yuzu, leaving only the zest. The fruit is then stuffed with a filling which can range from plain mochiko flour to a traditional blend of mochiko, shōyu, and other spices. The reserved top of the fruit is placed back in as a cap, and the whole thing is steamed repeatedly until the fruit is shiny and brown and the mochi has fully gelatinized. The longer the product is stored, the harder the texture will become. Both the rind and filling are edible. Yubeshi can be served in many ways, whether sliced thin on top of rice dishes and salad, or softened in a warm soup dish.
