= Karukan =

Japanese confection from Kyushu

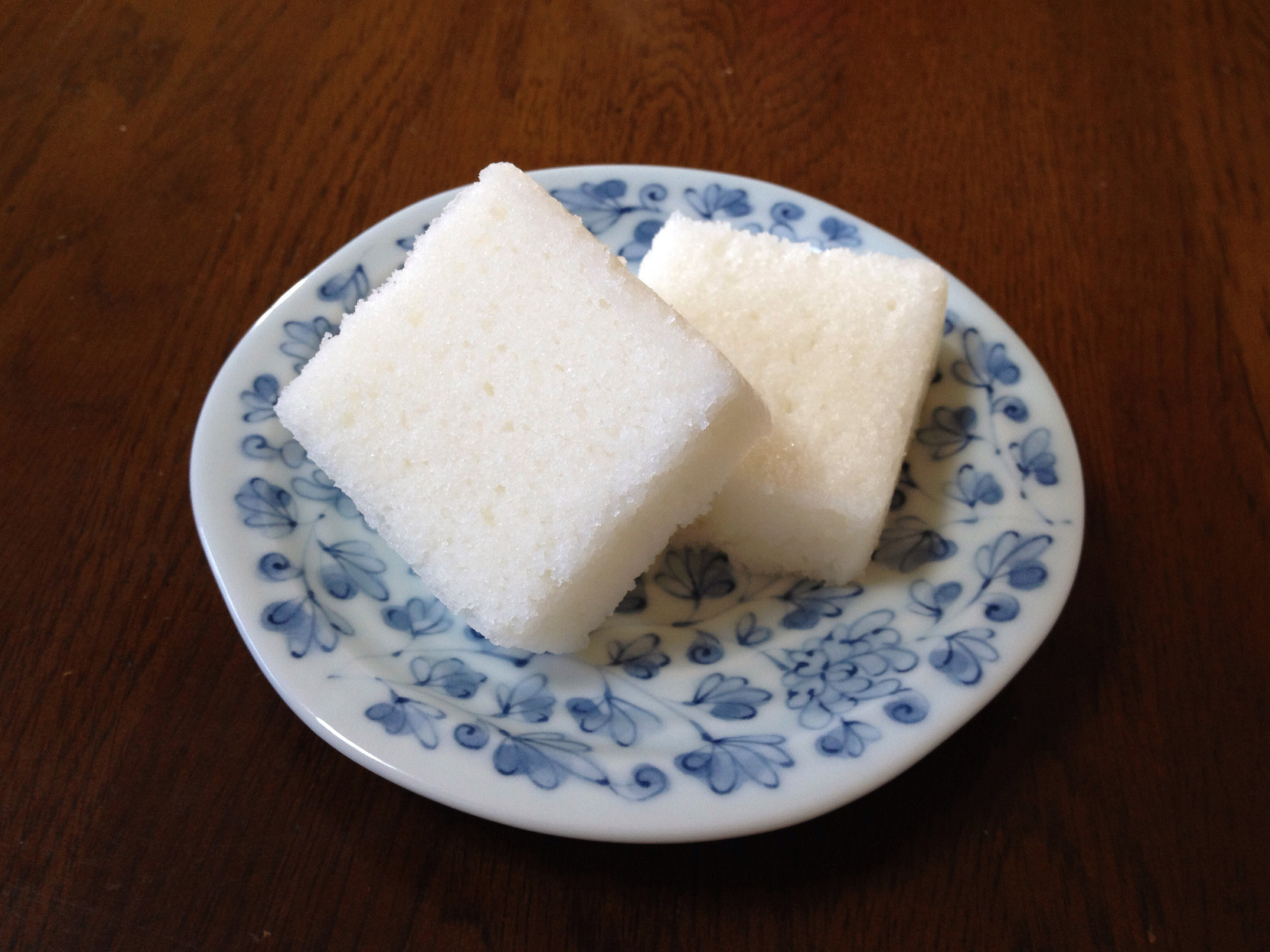
- Type: Confectionery
- Place of origin: Japan
- Main ingredients: Rice flour, sugar, Japanese yam, water, red bean paste

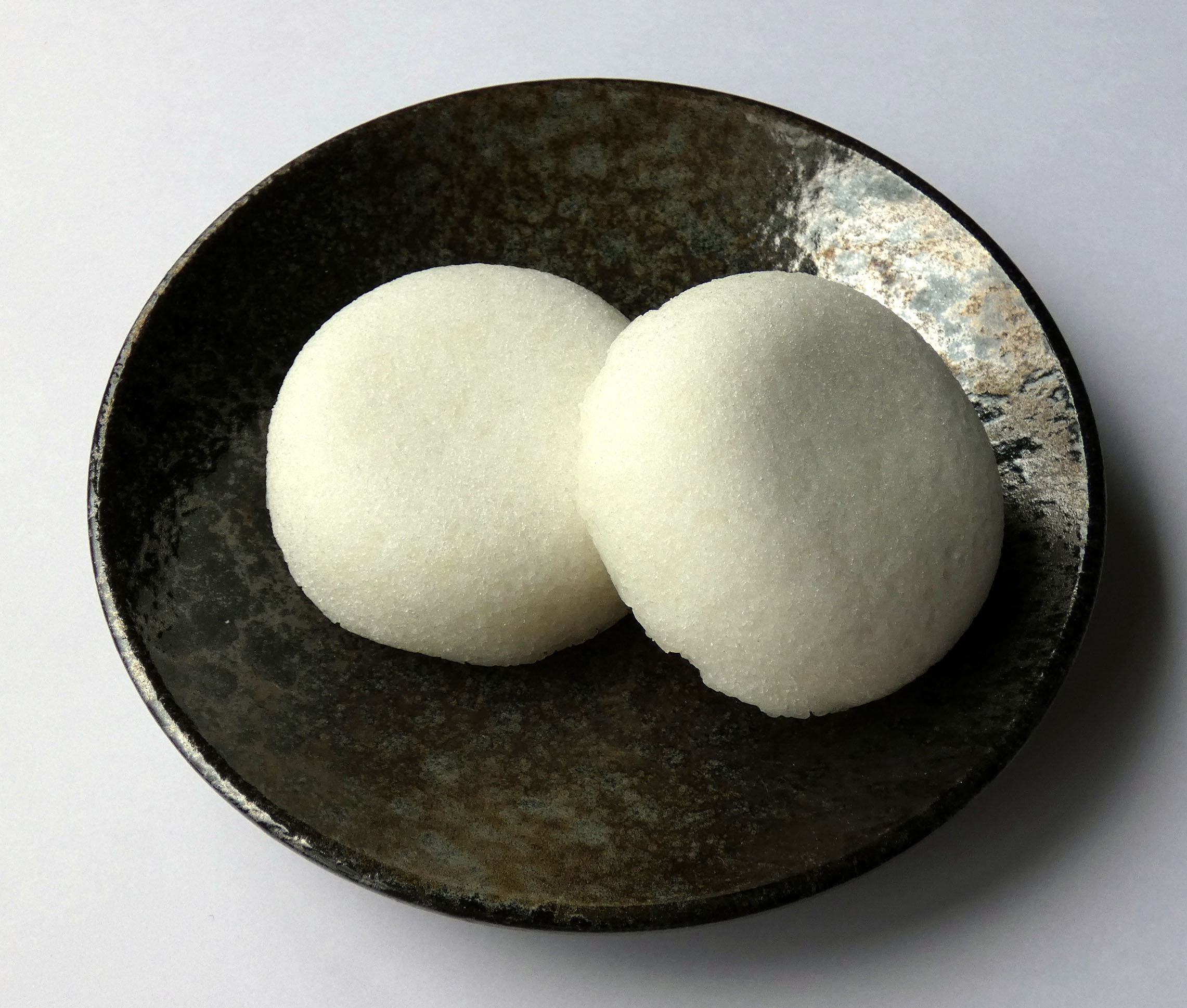
Karukan manju

Karukan (軽羹) is a Japanese confection from Kyushu. The origin of the name is "light" (軽) yokan (羹). Originally, karukan was “saomono gashi” which is a traditional confection in the form of a long block; but “karukan manjū”, which is filled with red bean paste, has become the norm in recent years.

== Preparation ==
Karukan is made from karukan rice flour powder, sugar, and grated Japanese yam. Water is added to the blended ingredients and the mixture is then kneaded and steamed. It is like an elastic white sponge.

== History ==
Karukan appeared during the rule of the Satsuma Domain from 1686 to 1715. The factor in the birth of karukan in Satsuma Domain is that yams, which are the main ingredient of karukan, grow wild and it is easy to get sugar which is made in Ryukyu and the Amami Islands. Another theory says that karukan was invented in 1854 by a confectioner who was invited by Shimazu Nariakira, the leader of Satsuma Domain. And fukuregashi, a kind of steamed cake with brown sugar, flour and baking soda, has also been produced in the area for a time. It is said that karukan was based on fukuregashi.

Karukan is made at multiple confectioneries in Kagoshima. It is sold widely in Miyazaki Prefecture and it is also made there. Confectioneries in Beppu, Oita, have been producing and selling karukan since 1952. It is a famous souvenir in Beppu. Also, there are some factories which produce and sell karukan in Fukuoka Prefecture.

== See also ==
- List of steamed foods
