= Chiran tea =

Japanese green tea

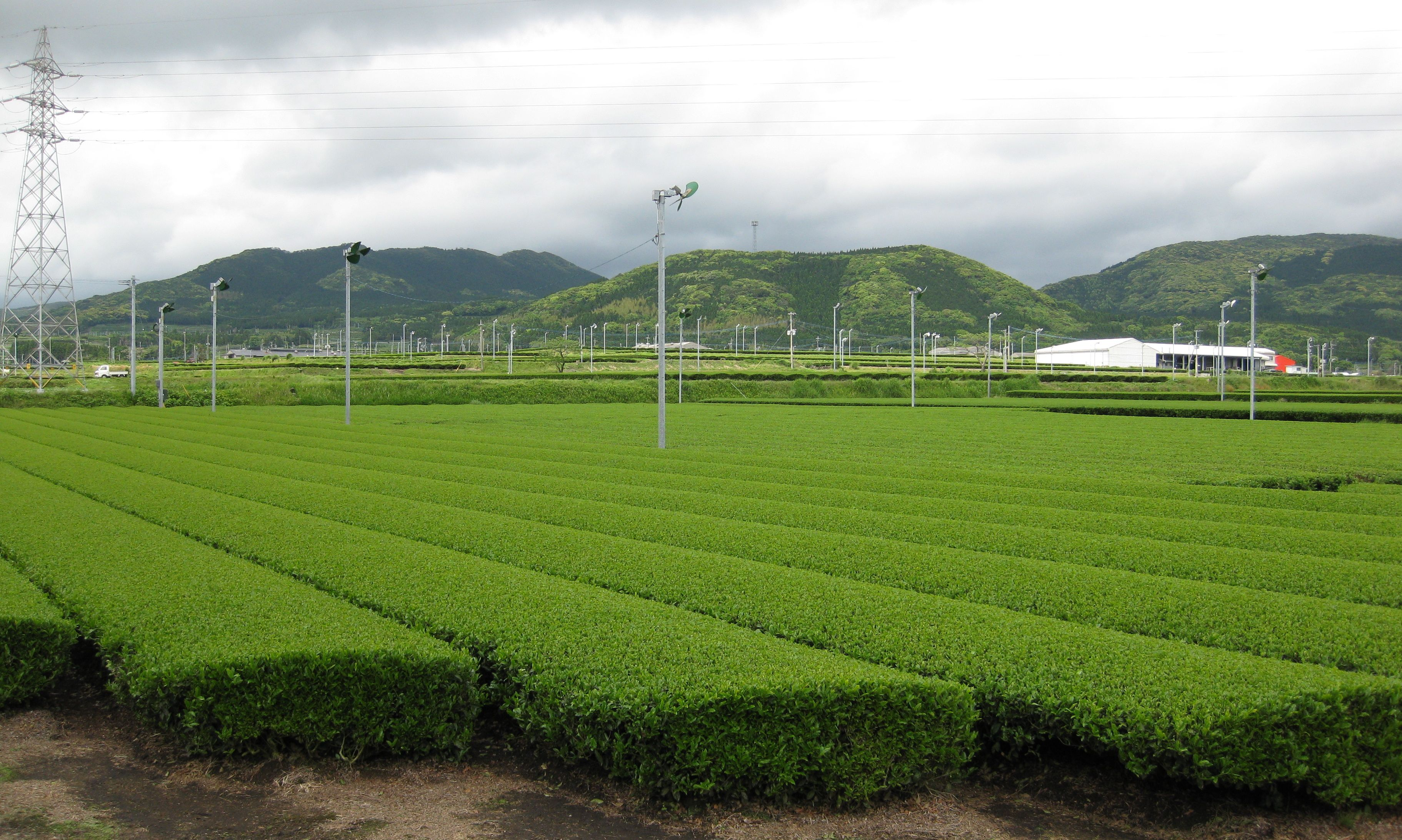
A tea plantation in Kagoshima

Chiran tea (知覧茶, Chirancha) is a type of Japanese green tea produced in Chiran, a former town in Kagoshima Prefecture, which is now part of Minamikyūshū.

== History ==
Villagers started growing teas in fields in 1872. In 1934, a tea factory was built. In 1938, the tea made there was presented to the emperor of Japan. The mild climate and fertile soil near the volcano Sakurajima are suited to growing tea.
