= Shimotsukare =

Japanese vegetable dish

Shimotsukare (しもつかれ) is a local Japanese dish served in the Northern Kantō region of Japan, primarily in Tochigi Prefecture but also in Gunma Prefecture and Ibaraki Prefecture. The dish is generally served on hatsu-u-no hi (初午の日, literally; first day of horse in the month of February) together with sekihan as an offering to appease the legendary deity, inari. Shimotsukare is usually made by simmering salmon head, vegetables, soybeans, abura-age (あぶらあげ or deep fried tofu skins) and sake kasu (酒粕, literally rice pulp from fermented sake). Common additional ingredients include grated raw radish (oroshi daikon) and carrots. The dish is also known as shimitsukari, shimitsukare or sumitsukare in some areas.

== Origin and history ==
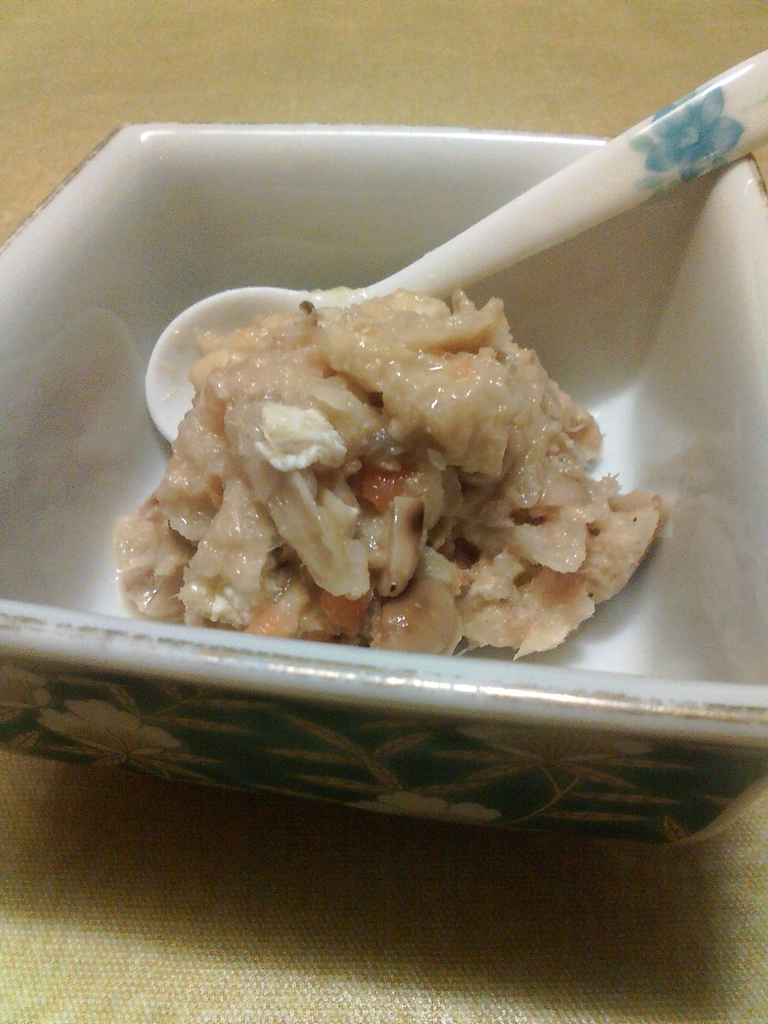
Shimotsukare:Preparation made by simmering soy beans with salmon head and sake kasu. A well known local dish in Tochigi.

The origins of shimotsukare can be traced back to Edo period (1603–1868) and is thought to be a derivation of su-mutsukari (酢むつかり, literally roasted soy beans in vinegar), a speciality dish which was mentioned in mythological narratives of Uji Shūi Monogatari (宇治拾遺物語) and Kojidan (古事談). The origin of the name "shimotsukare" remains in debate. It is also widely believed that as the dish is mainly served in Tochigi Prefecture, formerly known as Shimotsuke Province (下野国), the name of the dish is thought to be a derivation of the phrase shimotsuke no karei (下野の家例, "traditional customs of the Shimotsuke clan")

== Presentation ==
Various presentations of shimotsukare exists in different areas in Japan. The dish is served either hot or cold. Shimotsukare is normally served with rice but could also be taken without it. In some areas, once the dish is simmered, it will not be re-heated again when served.

As a means of preservation, simmered shimotsukare is kept in frozen grounds during winter and served on top of warm rice to allow it to thaw naturally.

Shimotsukare, together with its distinct flavor, scent and semi-liquid appearance is well received by some locals but not all. It is even nicknamed neko no gero (猫のゲロ, literally "cat's barf") by some Japanese.

== Nutrition ==
Some sayings such as "shimotsukare o nana-ken tabearukuto byoki ni naranai" (しもつかれを7軒食べ歩くと病気にならない literally, eating shimotsukare prepared from seven houses will keep you from getting sick) noted that consuming shimotsukare promotes good health. The dish is also sometimes included in jubako (重箱 or Japanese tier bento bako) and shared amongst neighbours to prevent them from catching cold during winter.

== Culture ==
Shimotsukare is a traditional home cooking and the recipe is passed down from mothers to the next generation. Though each preparation carries the same name of 'shimotsukare', ingredients and method of preparation varies from one household to another. Consequently, it is possible for people living in the same district to stumble upon shimotsukare that is totally different from their own preparation.

Shimotsukare can now be obtained conveniently in supermarkets and is sometimes served during kyushoku in some schools in Tochigi Prefecture.
