= Kanpyō (food) =

Strips of dried calabash gourd used in Japanese cuisine

Kanpyo (dried gourd strips)
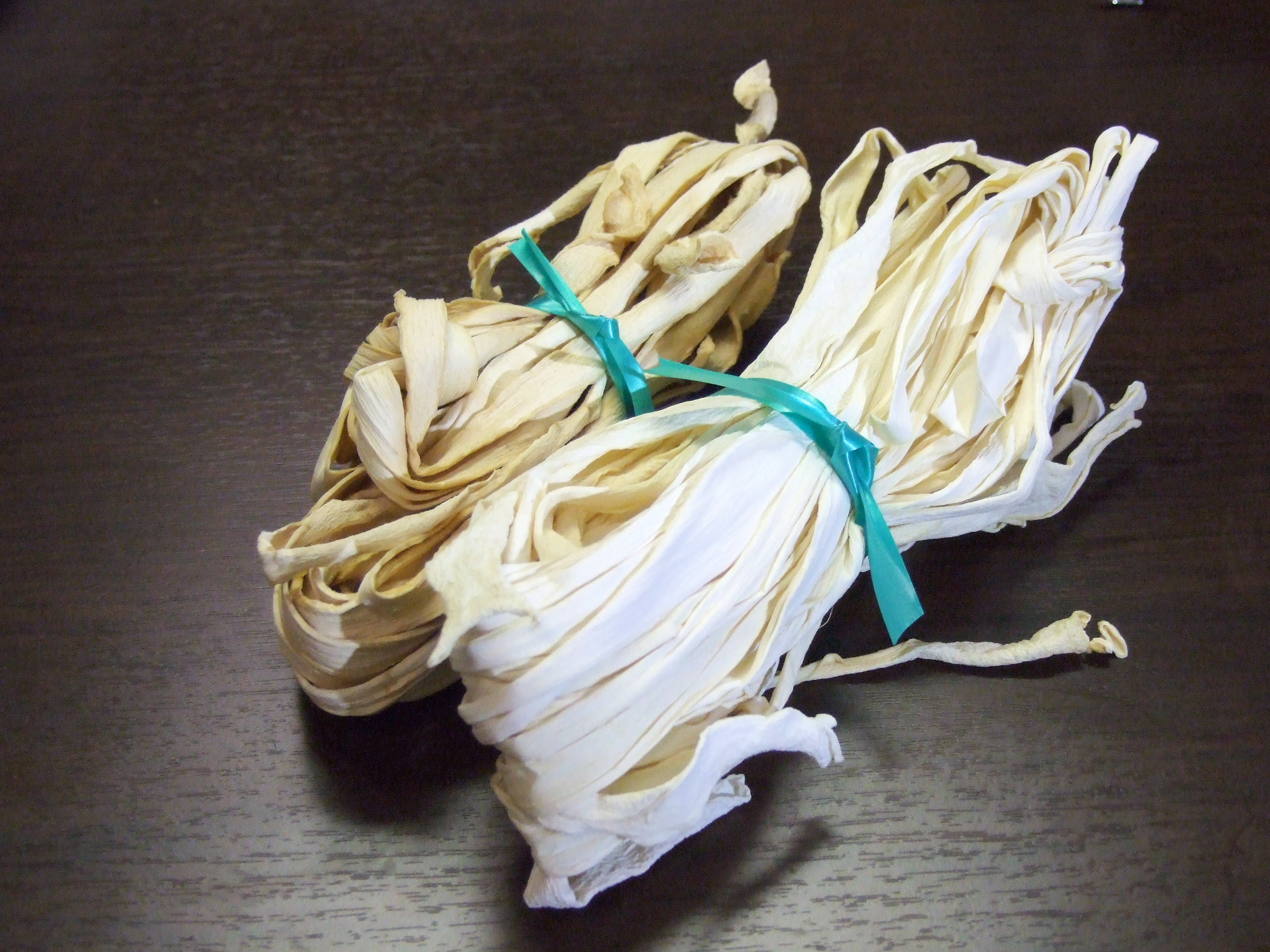
- Kanpyō (raw), dried shavings of Lagenaria siceraria var. hispida

Nutritional value per 100 g
- Energy: 1,079 kJ (258 kcal)
- Carbohydrates: 65.03 g
- Dietary fiber: 9.8 g
- Fat: 0.56 g
- Saturated: 0.045 g
- Trans: 0
- Monounsaturated: 0.103 g
- Polyunsaturated: 0.244 g
- Protein: 8.58 g
Vitamins and minerals
Vitamins	Quantity %DV^{†}
Vitamin A	0 IU
Thiamine (B1)	0% 0 mg
Riboflavin (B2)	3% 0.044 mg
Niacin (B3)	18% 2.9 mg
Pantothenic acid (B5)	51% 2.553 mg
Vitamin B6	31% 0.532 mg
Folate (B9)	15% 61 μg
Vitamin B12	0% 0 μg
Vitamin C	0% 0.2 mg
Vitamin D	0% 0 IU
Minerals	Quantity %DV^{†}
Calcium	22% 280 mg
Copper	48% 0.433 mg
Iron	28% 5.12 mg
Magnesium	30% 125 mg
Manganese	49% 1.137 mg
Phosphorus	15% 188 mg
Potassium	53% 1582 mg
Selenium	5% 2.6 μg
Sodium	1% 15 mg
Zinc	53% 5.86 mg
- Other constituents: Quantity
- Water: 19.97 g
- Alcohol (ethanol): 0
- Caffeine: 0
- Cholesterol: 0
- "USDA Database entry for Kanpyo, (dried gourd strips)". Archived from the original on 2019-04-03.
- ^{†}Percentages estimated using US recommendations for adults, except for potassium, which is estimated based on expert recommendation from the National Academies.

Kanpyō (かんぴょう or 干瓢), sometimes romanized and pronounced kampyō, are dried shavings of Lagenaria siceraria var. hispida, a variety of calabash gourd. The gourd is known as yugao (夕顔) or fukube (フクベ) in Japanese. Kanpyō is an ingredient in traditional Edo style Japanese cuisine. Cooked and flavored kanpyō is commonly used in futomaki sushi roll.

Kanpyō was originally grown in the Osaka region. Now it is a specialty product of Tochigi Prefecture, where it is a cottage industry. The region is so tied to the food product that it hosts the "Kanpyō Highway with History and Romance". The yuru-chara for Oyama, Tochigi is Kapyomaru (かぴょ丸), an anthropomorphized calabash.

The gourd is mostly harvested between mid-July and mid-August. The white flesh of the gourd is cut into strips 3 cm wide and 3 mm thick, then either dried in the sun or dehydrated. Over 200 tons a year of dried kanpyō are produced per year. Kanpyō available in the United States is sometimes chemically bleach-dried to a very white color, as opposed to the creamy color of the naturally-dried kind. Sulfur dioxide is sometimes used as a fumigant but must not be used in concentrations exceeding 5.0 g per 1 kg of dry matter.

== Dishes featuring kanpyō ==
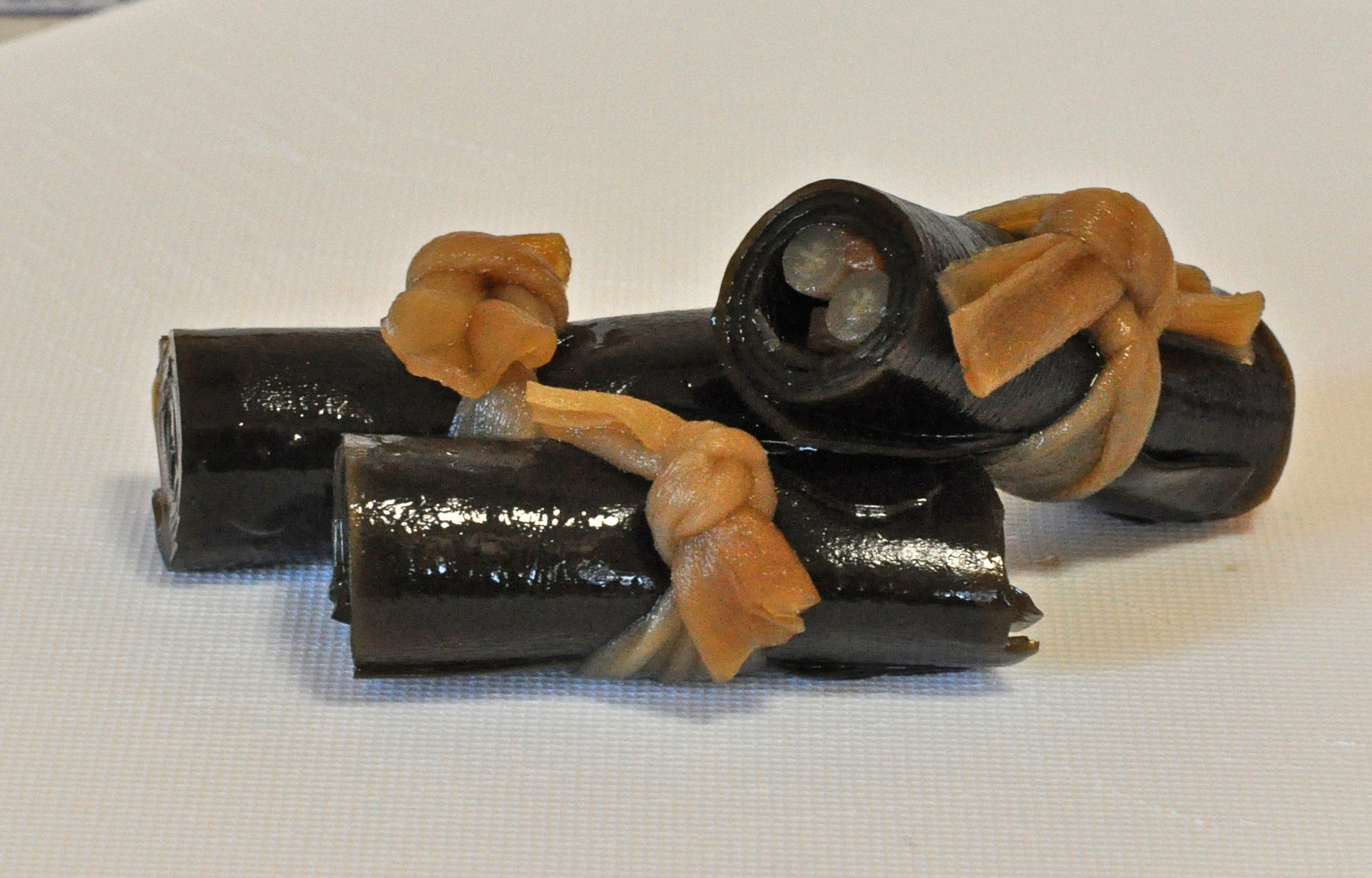
The traditional new year dish kombu-maki tied with strips of kanpyō

In addition to being the focus of many dishes, kanpyō strips are frequently used as an edible twist tie in dishes such as fukusa-zushi and chakin-zushi. Typically the dried strips are boiled to soften, and then boiled a second time with soy sauce, sugar, and other ingredients added for flavor.

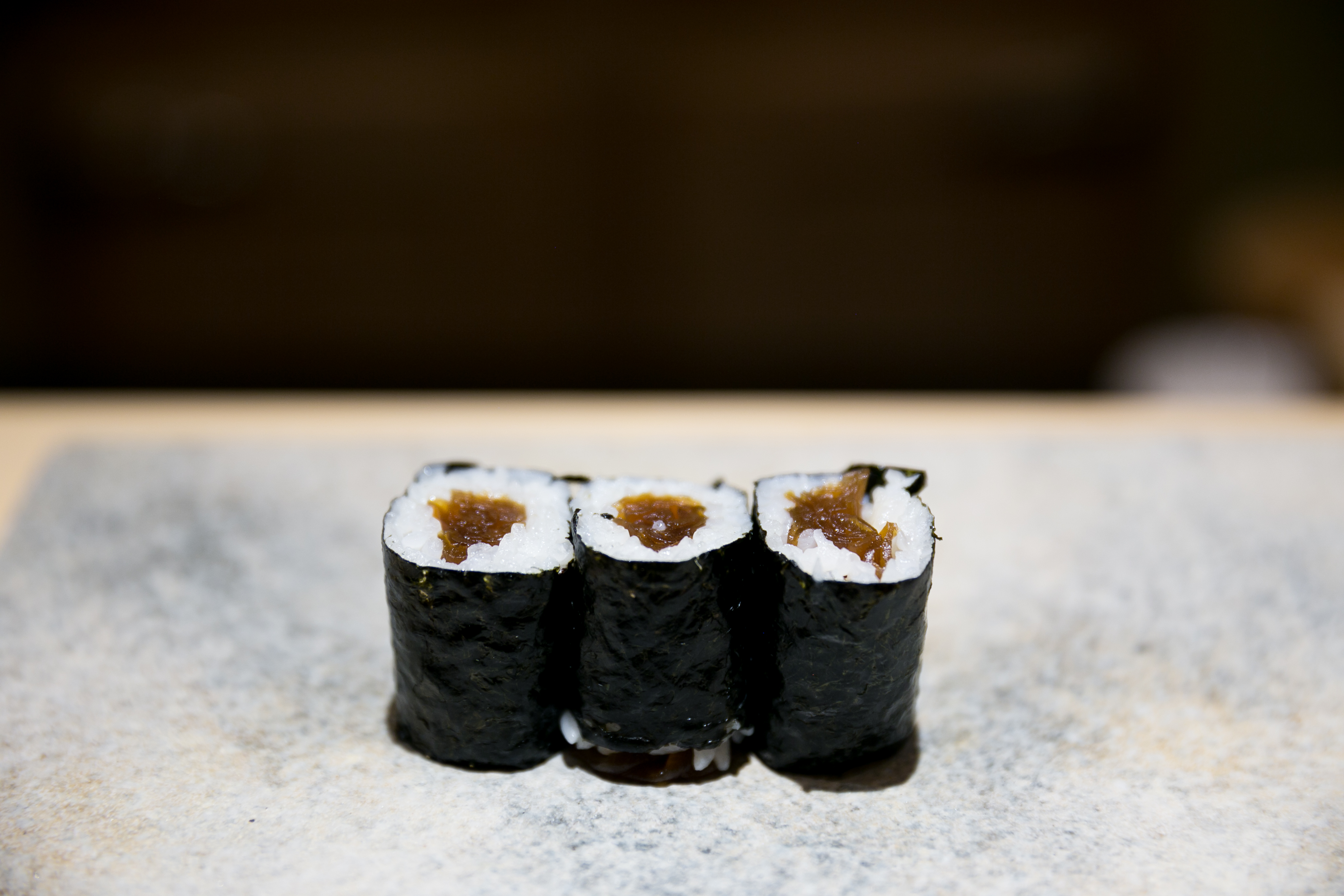
Kanpyō-maki rolls

- Futomaki
- Kanpyō-maki, also called teppo maki ("gun barrel maki") as it looks like the end of a rifle
- Matsukasa sushi ("pinecone sushi"), a roll using squid filet (instead of nori) wrapped around sushi rice, kanpyō, shiitake, snow peas, and whitefish
- Shojin dashijiru, a vegan soup stock

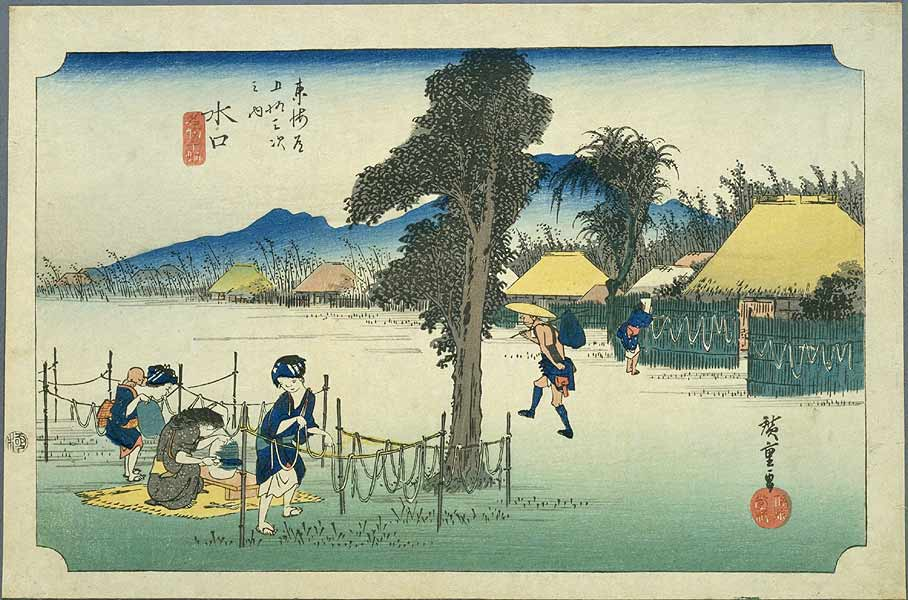
Kanpyō drying in Minakuchi-juku from The Fifty-three Stations of the Tōkaidō by Hiroshige

== See also ==
- Oden
