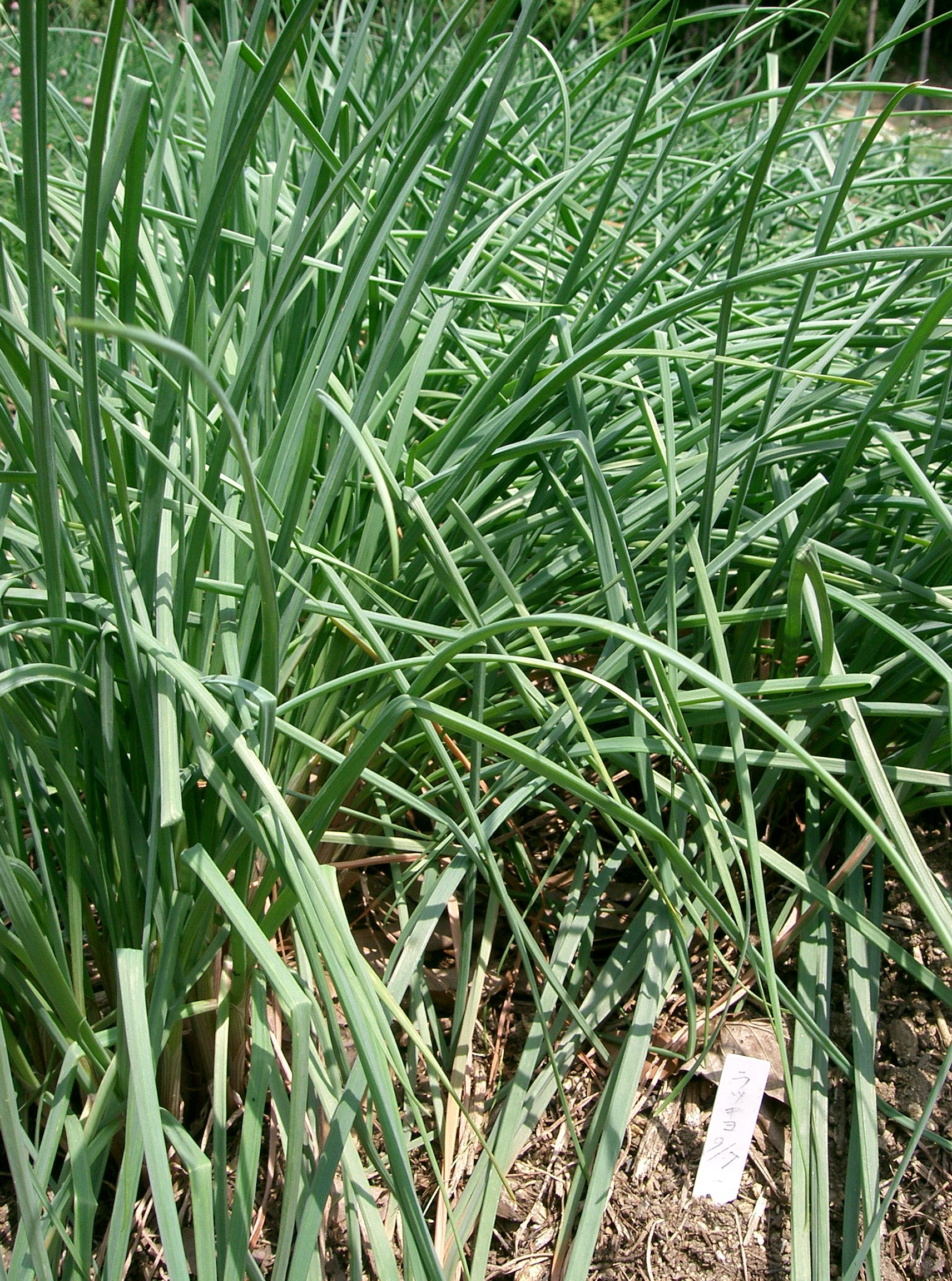

Conservation status
- Least Concern (IUCN 3.1)

Scientific classification
- Kingdom: Plantae
- Clade: Embryophytes
- Clade: Tracheophytes
- Clade: Spermatophytes
- Clade: Angiosperms
- Clade: Monocots
- Order: Asparagales
- Family: Amaryllidaceae
- Subfamily: Allioideae
- Genus: Allium
- Subgenus: A. subg. Cepa
- Species: A. chinense

Binomial name
- Allium chinense G.Don.

Synonyms
- Synonymy: Allium bakeri Regel; Allium bodinieri H.Lév. & Vaniot; Allium exsertum Baker 1874, illegitimate homonym not G. Don 1827; Allium martini H.Lév. & Vaniot; Allium splendens Miq. 1867, illegitimate homonym not Willd. 1830; Caloscordum exsertum Herb.

= Allium chinense =

Chinese onion

Species of Allium

Allium chinense (also known as Jiaotou, Chinese onion, Chinese scallion, glittering chive, Japanese scallion, Kiangsi scallion, and Oriental onion) is an edible species of Allium, native to China, and cultivated in many other countries. Its close relatives include the onion, scallion, leek, chive, and garlic.

== Distribution ==
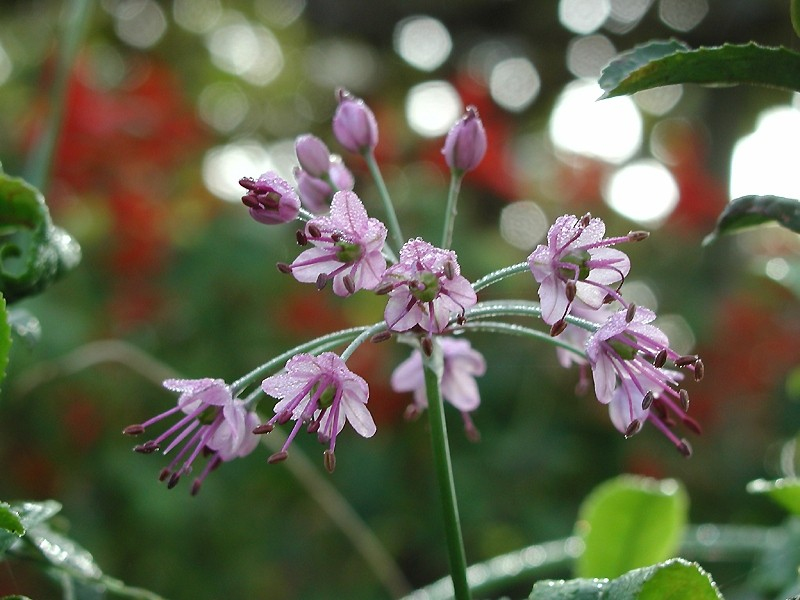
Flowers of Allium chinense

Allium chinense is native to China (in Anhui, Fujian, Guangdong, Guangxi, Guizhou, Hainan, Henan, Hubei, Hunan, Jiangxi, and Zhejiang provinces). It is naturalized in other parts of Asia as well as in North America.

== Uses ==
=== Culinary ===
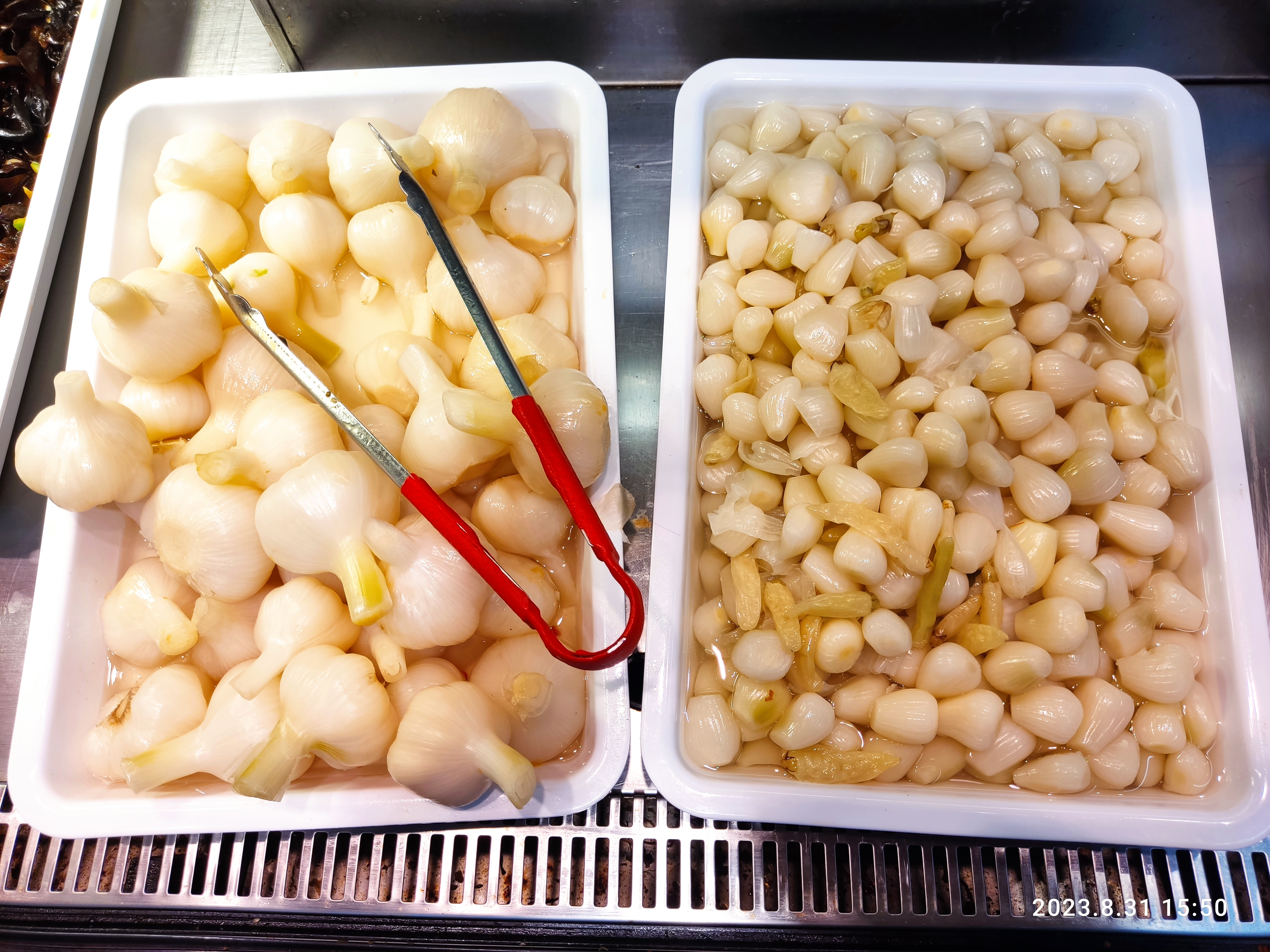
Sold at a market in Shenzhen (left)

Owing to its very mild and "fresh" taste, A. chinense is often pickled and served as a side dish in Japan and Vietnam to balance the stronger flavor of some other component in a meal. For example, in Japanese cuisine, it is eaten as a garnish on Japanese curry.

In Vietnam, pickled A. chinense, known as củ kiệu, is often served during Tết (Lunar New Year).

In Japanese, it is known as rakkyō (辣韮 or 薤). Glass bottles of white rakkyō bulb pickles are sold in Asian supermarkets in North America.

=== Medicinal ===
Allium chinense is used as a folk medicine in tonics to help the intestines, and as a stomachic.

== See also ==
- Allium tuberosum, also known as garlic chives – Species of onion native to southwestern parts of the Chinese province of Shanxi
- Pickled onion – Onions pickled in a solution of vinegar or salt
