= Nine mountain schools =

Korean Seon Buddhist monasteries

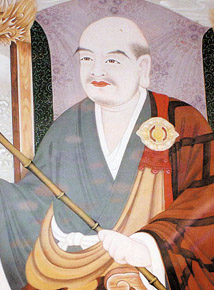
Doui, a student of Zhizang and Baizhang who established the Gaji san school (迦智山) at Borimsa.

The nine mountain schools (九山; or gusan) were the initial monasteries of the Korean branch of Buddhism called Seon, founded in the Unified Silla period in the 8th or 9th century.

The initial transmission of Seon into Korea is usually attributed to Beomnang (法朗; fl. 632–646), said to be a student of the Chinese master Daoxin (道信; 580–651). Seon was later popularized especially by Sinhaeng (神行; 704–779) in the latter part of the eighth century and by Doui (道義; d. 825) at the beginning of the ninth century. From then on, many Koreans studied Chan in China and, upon their return, established their own schools at various mountain monasteries with their leading disciples.

== List of schools ==
The number of these schools was initially fixed to nine, whence the name derives. Eight of these schools were of the lineage of Mazu Daoyi (馬祖道一; 709–788), as they were established through connection with either him or one of his eminent disciples:

1. The Gajisan school (迦智山), established at Borimsa (寶林寺) under the influence of Doui and his grand-student Chejing (體澄; 804–890). Doui studied in China under Zhizang (735-814) and Baizhang (百丈; 749–814).
2. The Seongjusan school (聖住山), established by Muyeom (無染; 800–888) who received his inga from Magu Baozhe (麻谷寶徹; b. 720?).
3. The Silsangsan school (實相山), founded by Hongcheok (洪陟; fl. 830), who also studied under Zhizang.
4. The Huiyangsan school (曦陽山), founded by Beomnang and Chiseon Doheon (智詵道憲; 824–882), who was taught by a Korean teacher of the Mazu transmission.
5. The Bongnimsan school (鳳林山), established by Weongam (圓鑑; 787-869) and his student Simhui (審希; fl. 9c). Weongam was a student of Zhangjing Huaihui (章敬懷暉; 748–835).
6. The Dongnisan school (桐裡山), established by Hyejeol (慧徹; 785–861) who was a student of Zhizang.
7. The Sagulsan school (闍崛山), established by Beom'il (梵日; 810–889), who studied in China with Yanguan Qian (鹽官齊安; 750?-842) and Yuesha Weiyan (樂山惟嚴).
8. The Sajasan school (獅子山), established by Doyun (道允; 797-868), who studied under Nanquan Puyan (南泉普願; 748–835).

The ninth of these initial schools was the Sumisan (須彌山) school founded by Ieom (利嚴; 869–936), which had developed from the Caodong (曹洞) lineage.
