= Fermented tea =

Tea that has undergone microbial fermentation

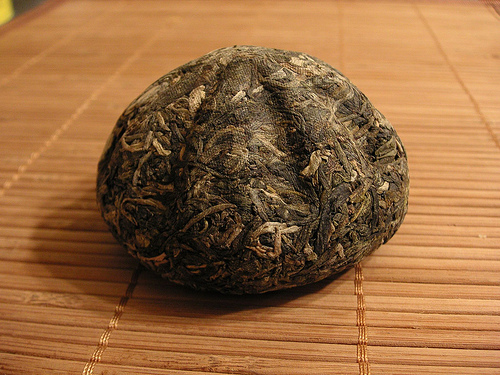
- Golden melon pu'er tea
- Chinese: 黑茶
- Literal meaning: Black/dark tea
- Hanyu Pinyin: hēichá
- Hokkien POJ: hek-tê

Alternative Chinese name
- Traditional Chinese: 後發酵茶
- Simplified Chinese: 后发酵茶
- Literal meaning: post-fermented tea
- Hanyu Pinyin: hòu fājiào chá

Fermented tea (also known as post-fermented tea, and literally translated as black tea from Chinese) is a class of tea that has undergone microbial fermentation, from several months to many years. The exposure of the tea leaves to humidity and oxygen during the process also causes endo-oxidation (derived from the tea-leaf enzymes themselves) and exo-oxidation (which is microbially catalysed). The tea leaves and the liquor made from them become darker with oxidation. Thus, the various kinds of fermented teas produced across China are also referred to as black or dark tea, not be confused with black tea in English, which is actually referred to as "red tea" (hong cha, 红茶) in Chinese. The most famous fermented tea is pu'er produced in Yunnan province.

The fermentation of tea leaves alters their chemistry, affecting the organoleptic qualities of the tea made from them. Fermentation affects the smell of the tea and typically mellows its taste, reducing astringency and bitterness while improving mouthfeel and aftertaste. The microbes may also produce metabolites with health benefits. Additionally, substances like ethyl carbamate (urethane) may be produced.

The fermentation is carried out primarily by molds. Aspergillus niger was implicated as the main microbial organism in the pu'er process, but that species identification has been challenged by comprehensive PCR-DGGE analysis, which points to Aspergillus luchuensis as the primary agent of fermentation.

Most varieties of fermented teas are produced in China, its country of origin, with several varieties also produced in Korea and Japan. In Myanmar, lahpet is a form of fermented tea that is eaten as a vegetable, and similar pickled teas are also eaten or chewed in northern Thailand and southern Yunnan.

== History ==
The early history of dark tea is unclear, but there are several legends and some credible theories.

For example, one legend holds that dark tea was first produced accidentally, on the Silk Road and Tea Road by tea caravans in the rainy season. When the tea was soaked in rain, the tea transporters abandoned it for fear of contamination. The next year, nearby villages suffered from dysentery, and decided to drink the abandoned mildewed tea in desperation. The legend concludes that the tea cured those suffering, and quickly became popular.

Other historical accounts attribute the first production of dark tea to the Ming dynasty in the 15th and 16th centuries. It may have been first traded by tea merchants much earlier than the legends state, across the historical borders of Han and Tibetan cultural areas.

== Varieties ==
Fermented teas can be divided according to how they are produced. Piled teas, such as the Chinese post-fermented teas, and the Toyama kurocha produced in Japan, are fermented with naturally occurring fungus under relatively dry conditions. Other fermented teas, called pickled teas, are fermented in a wet process with lactic acid bacteria. Pickled teas include miang from Thailand and awabancha from Japan. A third category, including the Japanese goishicha and Ishizuchi kurocha, is fermented with the piled and pickling methods successively.

=== China ===
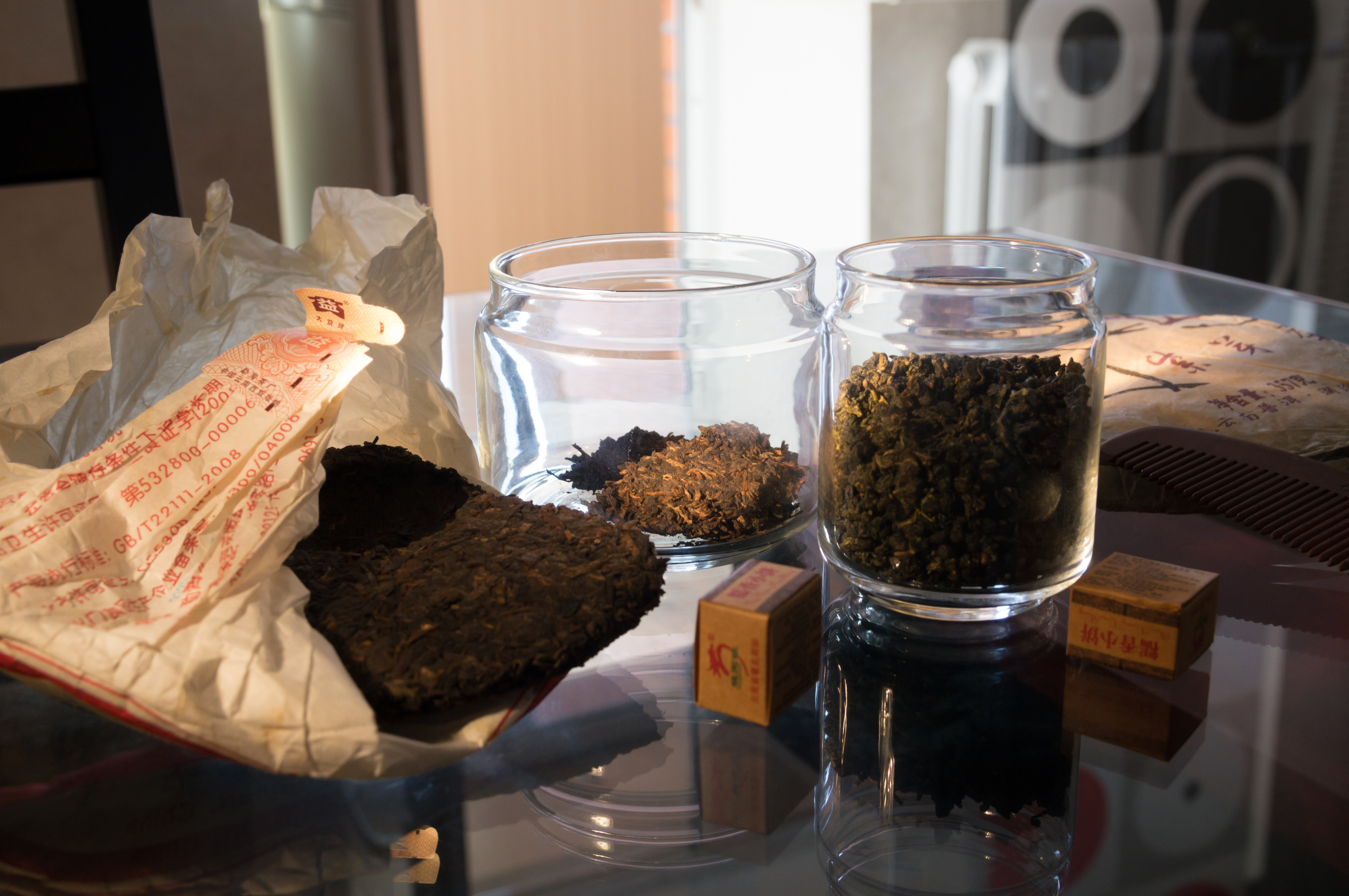
Pu'er tea from Yunnan, China

Fermented tea originated in China, where it is commonly known as hei cha (黑茶) or dark tea. Hei cha is produced in many areas of China, mostly in the warmer southern provinces. It is commonly pressed into bricks or cakes for ageing.

The most famous and important producing areas and varieties include:

- Anhui: Liu an lan cha (安徽六安籃茶, Anhui Lu'an basket tea)
- Guangxi: Liu bao cha (廣西六堡茶, Guangxi Liubao tea, often sold as 松黑茶, loose dark tea)
- Hubei: Qing zhuan cha (湖北青砖茶, Hubei green brick tea)
- Hunan: Fu zhuan cha (湖南茯磚茶 (黑茶), the famous fu zhuan 茯磚茶 "brick tea")
- Jingyang, Shaanxi: Fu zhuan cha (陕西泾阳茯茶 (黑茶), the famous fu zhuan 茯磚茶 "brick tea")
- Sichuan: Lu bian cha (四川路边茶, Sichuan border tea)
- Tibet: Zang cha (藏茶, Tibetan tea, often called Tibetan brick tea)
- Yunnan: Pu'er cha (雲南普洱茶, either "raw" sheng pu'er 生普洱 or "ripened" shu pu'er 熟普洱)

Shapes include:

- Bamboo leaf logs
- Cakes, or bing cha (餅茶)
- Bricks, or zhuan cha (磚茶)
- Loose, in baskets
- Bird nests, or tuo cha (沱茶), usually pu'er tea
- Squares, or fang cha (方茶)

=== Japan ===
Several distinct varieties of fermented tea are produced in Japan. Toyama prefecture's kurocha is Japan's only piled tea, similar to the Chinese post-fermented teas. Toyama kurocha is traditionally prepared by boiling in water, adding salt and stirring with a whisk as in a traditional tea ceremony. It is consumed on religious occasions or during meetings in the Asahi area of the prefecture. Awabancha (阿波番茶), produced in Tokushima prefecture, and batabatacha, like the Toyama kurocha associated with Asahi, Toyama, are made from bancha, or second flush tea leaves, with bacterial fermentation. Batabatacha has been found to contain vitamin B_{12}, but in insignificant amounts for human diets. Goishicha (碁石茶) from Ōtoyo, Kōchi and Ishizuchi kurocha grown at the foot of Mount Ishizuchi in Ehime prefecture are made by fermenting the tea in a two step process, first with aerobic fungi, then with anaerobic bacteria.

=== Korea ===
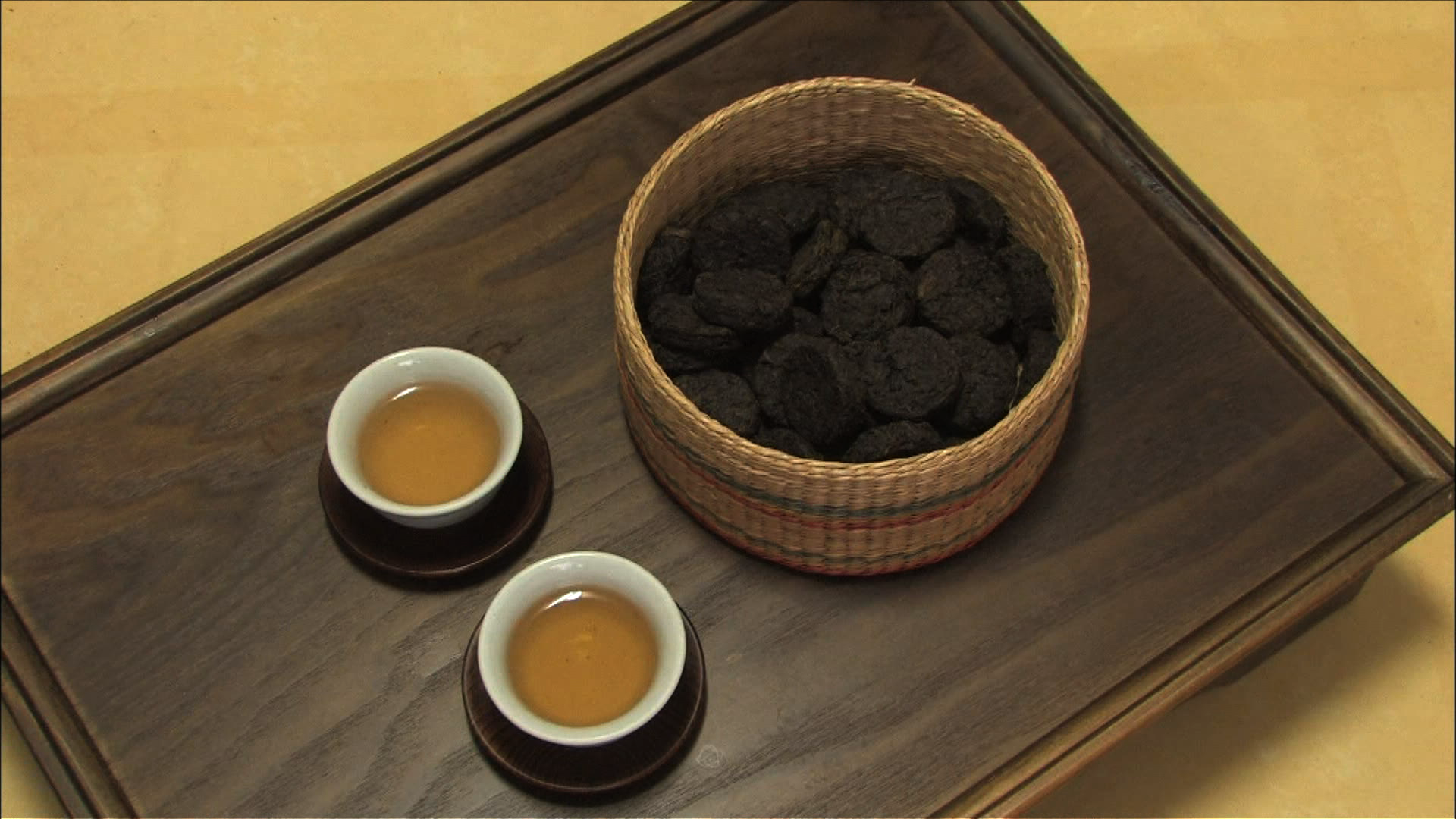
Tteokcha

Tteokcha (떡차; lit. '"cake tea"'), also called byeongcha (병차; 餠茶; lit. '"cake tea"'), was the most commonly produced and consumed type of tea in pre-modern Korea. Pressed tea made into the shape of yeopjeon, the coins with holes, was called doncha (돈차; lit. '"money tea"'), jeoncha (전차; 錢茶; lit. '"money tea"'), or cheongtaejeon (청태전; 靑苔錢; lit. '"green moss coin"'). Borim-cha (보림차; 寶林茶) or Borim-baengmo-cha (보림백모차; 寶林白茅茶), named after its birthplace, the Borim temple in Jangheung, South Jeolla Province, is a popular tteokcha variety.

=== Edible pickled tea ===
Though the early history of tea is unclear, it has been established that for centuries people have chewed tea leaves. Few peoples today continue to consume tea by chewing or eating.

In Northern Thailand, a pickled tea product called miang (เมี่ยง) is chewed as a stimulant. Steamed tea leaves are kept pressed into sealed bamboo baskets until the anaerobic fermentation produces a compact cake with the desired flavor. The fermentation takes four to seven days for young leaves and about a year for mature leaves. Miang is related to the Thai and Lao street snack miang kham.

Pickled tea known as lahpet is widely consumed in Burmese cuisine, and plays an important role in Burmese ritual culture. After fermentation, the tea is eaten as a vegetable.

A similar pickled tea is eaten by the Blang people of Xishuangbanna in Yunnan, China, on the border with Myanmar and Laos. The tea, known locally as miam and in Chinese as suancha (酸茶), is first packed into bamboo tubes, then buried and allowed to ferment before eating.

== Production ==
Many fermented teas do not arrive on the market ready for consumption. Instead, they may start as green teas or partially oxidized oolong-like teas, which are then allowed to slowly oxidize and undergo microbial fermentation over many years (comparable to wines that are sold to be aged in a cellar). Alternatively, fermented teas can be created quickly through a ripening process spanning several months, as with Shu Pu'er. This ripening is done through a controlled process similar to composting, where the moisture and temperature of the tea are carefully monitored. The product is "finished" fermented tea.

Fermented teas are commonly sold as compressed tea of various shapes, including bricks, discs, bowls, or mushrooms. Ripened pu'er teas are ripened while loose, then compressed. Fermented teas can be aged for many years to improve their flavor, again comparable to wines. Raw pu'er tea can be aged up to 50 years in some cases without diminishing in quality, and ripened pu'er can be aged up to 10 or 15 years. Experts and aficionados disagree about the optimal age.

Many Tibetans and Central Asians use pu'er or other fermented teas as a caloric and micronutrient food, boiled with yak butter, sugar and salt to make yak butter tea.

== Ageing and storage ==
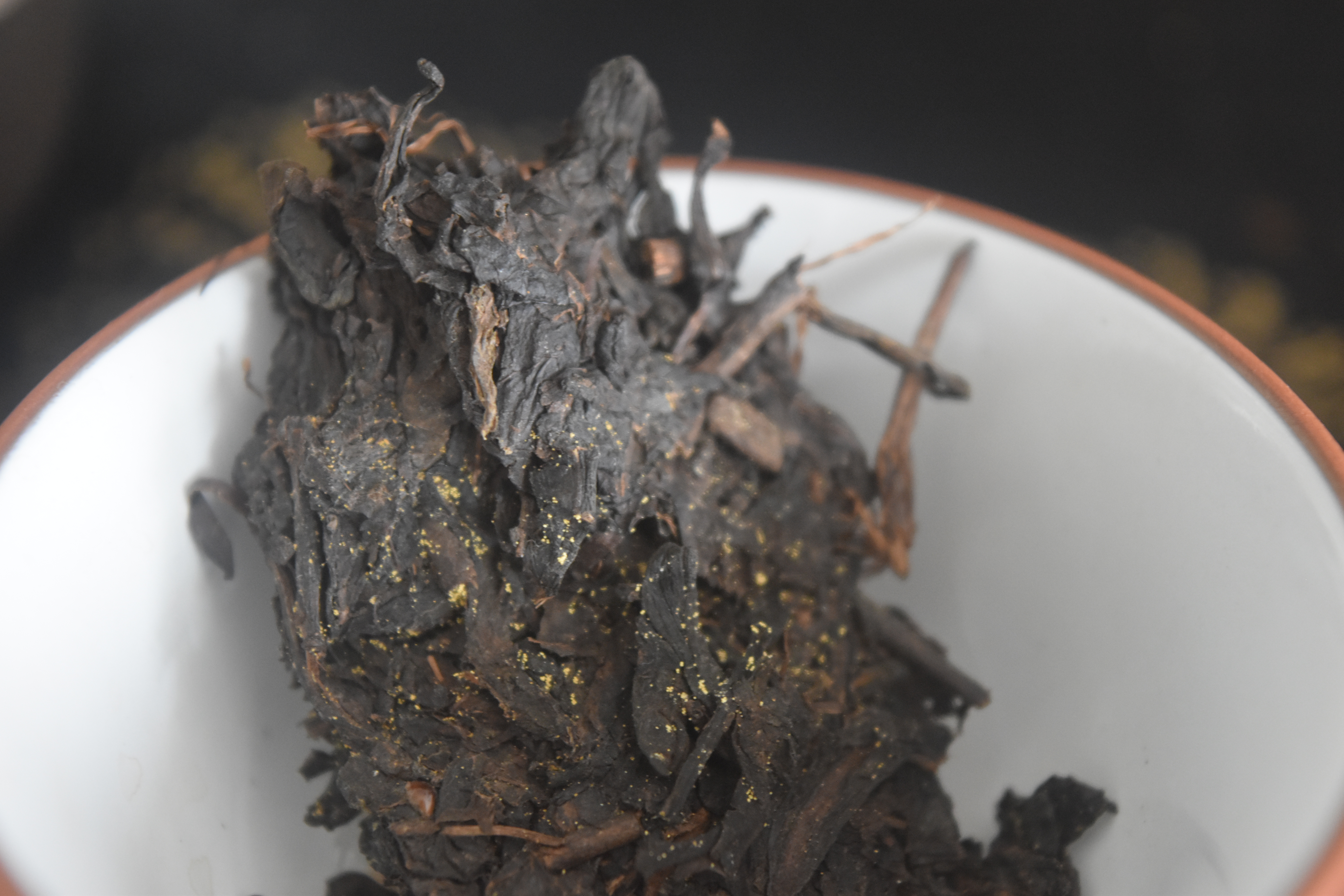
jin hua hei cha from Liu Bao with Aspergillus cristatus, formerly Eurotium cristatum

Post-fermented tea usually gets more valuable with age. Dark tea is often aged in bamboo baskets, bamboo-leaf coverings, or in its original packaging.

Many varieties of dark tea are purposely aged in humid environments to promote the growth of certain fungi, often called "golden flowers" or jin hua (金花) because of the bright yellow color.

== See also ==
- List of Chinese teas
- Kombucha, a beverage produced by fermentation of brewed tea using a symbiotic culture of bacteria and yeast
