= Sajasan =

Sajasan (사자산; 獅子山) may refer to:

- Sajasan (Gangwon), mountain in South Korea
- Sajasan (South Jeolla), mountain in South Korea
