= Bo lei =

Bo lei may refer to:

- Lei Bo (雷薄), a military officer serving under the Eastern Han dynasty warlord Yuan Shu
- Bolei tea, a Cantonese pronunciation for Pu-erh tea
