= Gajisan =

Gajisan may refer to:

- Gajisan (Ulsan/Gyeongsang), a mountain in South Korea
- Gajisan (South Jeolla), a mountain in South Korea
