= Doncha =

Coin-shaped post-fermented tea

- Type: Post-fermented tea
- Other names: Cheongtae-jeon; jeoncha
- Origin: Korea
- Quick description: Coin-shaped post-fermented tea
- Temperature: 85–95 °C (185–203 °F)
- Time: 5‒10 minutes

Korean name
- Hangul: 돈차
- Hanja: 돈茶
- Lit.: money tea
- RR: doncha
- MR: tonch'a
- IPA: ton.tɕʰa

Alternate name
- Hangul: 전차
- Hanja: 錢茶
- Lit.: money tea
- RR: jeoncha
- MR: chŏnch'a
- IPA: tɕʌn.tɕʰa

Alternate name
- Hangul: 청태전
- Hanja: 靑苔錢
- Lit.: green moss coin
- RR: cheongtaejeon
- MR: ch'ŏngt'aejŏn
- IPA: tɕʰʌŋ.tʰɛ.dʑʌn

Doncha (Korean: 돈차; pronounced [ton.tɕʰa]; lit. 'money tea'), or don tea, also called jeoncha (전차; 錢茶; lit. money tea), is a coin-shaped post-fermented tea produced in Korea. The tea has been called cheongtae-jeon (청태전; 靑苔錢; lit. "green moss coin") in the Jangheung region in South Jeolla Province.

== History ==
The history of doncha dates back to the era of Later Silla, when Borimsa (Borim temple) was founded. The Jangheung region in South Jeolla Province, where the temple is located, was the hub of Korean tea culture during the Goryeo and Joseon dynasties. 13 out of 19 daso (tea place) in Goryeo were located in the region.

== Processing ==
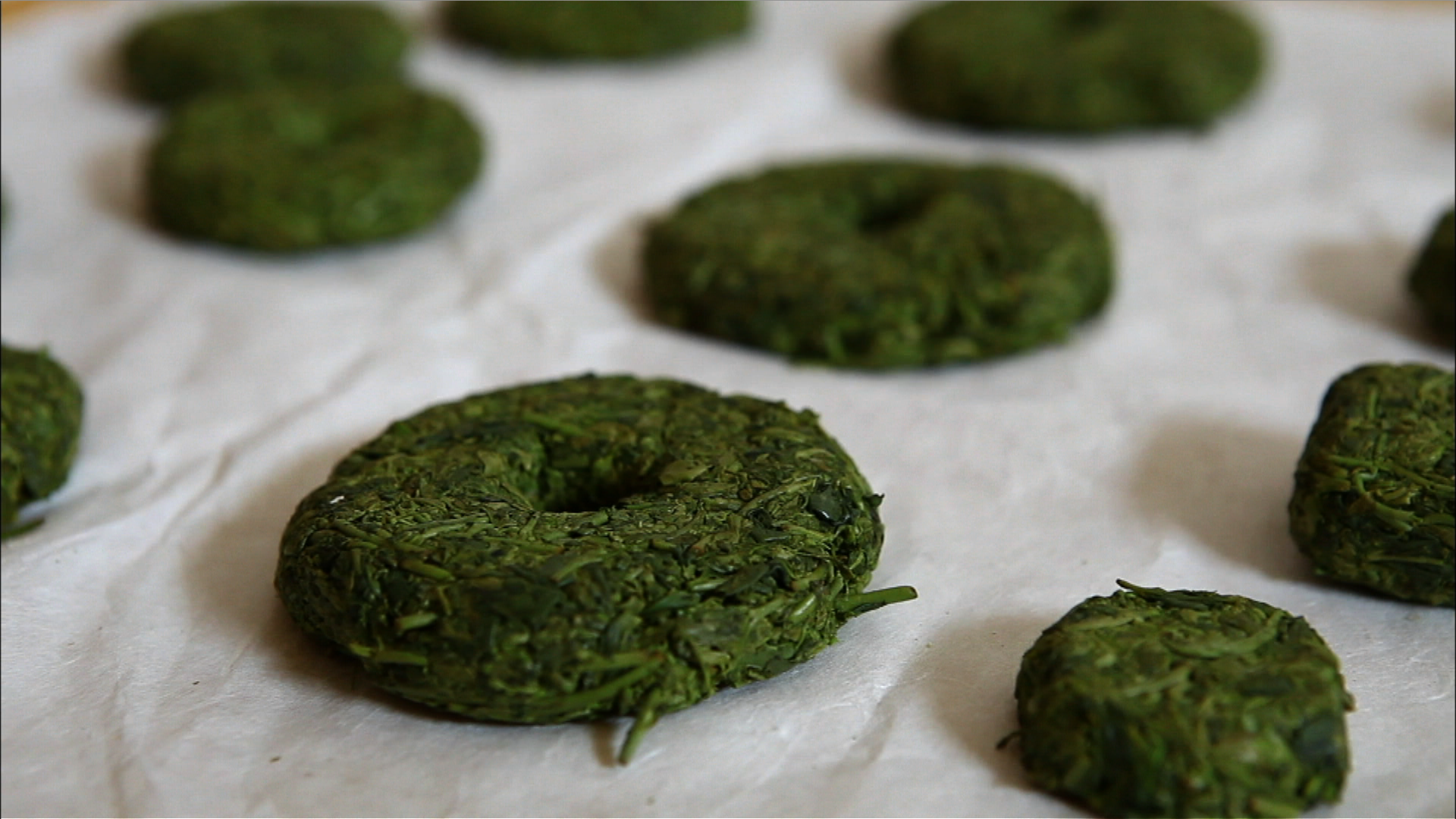
Freshly shaped doncha

Tea leaves for doncha are hand-picked in May, from the tea plants that grow wild somewhere on the southern coast of the Korean peninsula. Although roasting is the most common method of tea processing in Korea, doncha processing starts with steaming the tea leaves. Twelve hours after the harvest, tea leaves are steamed in a gamasot, a traditional cauldron. Steamed leaves are then pounded in a jeolgu, a traditional mortar, or a maetdol, a traditional millstone. the tea is then shaped into round lumps and sun-dried. Once dried, a hole is made in the center of each lump of tea and they attain the characteristic shape of yeopjeon (coin) from which their name is derived. The tea is then fermented for at least six months as aging helps to develop an enriched flavor and aroma, though sometimes fermentation can last for over twenty years.

== Preparation ==
A lump of doncha, about 7–9 grams (0.25–0.32 oz), can be steeped in 500–600 millilitres (18–21 imp fl oz; 17–20 US fl oz) of hot water for five to ten minutes. The tea lump is often roasted on both sides over low heat before consumption. Roasting helps with sterilization of the tea leaves, as well as the development of a unique aroma and flavor. Doncha retains its aroma and flavor after re-steeping three to four times.

== Use in traditional medicine ==
In traditional Korean medicine the tea was thought to help alleviate mild symptoms such as stomach ache, aid detoxification, reduce fever, prevent constipation, and help manage cold symptoms.
