= Tibetan tea =

Tibetan post-fermented tea

Tibetan tea (Note: Tibetan: བོད་ཇ, THL: bö ja; Chinese: 藏茶; pinyin: Zàng chá) or Tibeti chá, is a post-fermented tea (Note: Tibetan: ཇ་ནག, THL: ja nak; Chinese: 黑茶; pinyin: hēi chá) that originated in Ya'an. It has been long been traded as a tea brick (Note: Tibetan: ཇ་སྦག, THL: ja bak; Chinese: 磚茶; pinyin: zhuān chá) between China and Tibet. The tea is packed in Kangding and shipped over the caravan routes by yak.

The writer Keith Souter called Tibeti chá "a famous Tibetan tea, which can be made into tea bricks". In 1842, Godfrey Vigne wrote of Tibeti, "When well made, it resembles chocolate in appearance, in consequence of the reddish tinge imparted to the tea by the presence of the soda, which prevents it also from cloying."

== See also ==
- Butter tea – South Asian and Tibetan drink
