= Sajasan (Jeonnam-Gwangju) =

Mountain in South Korea

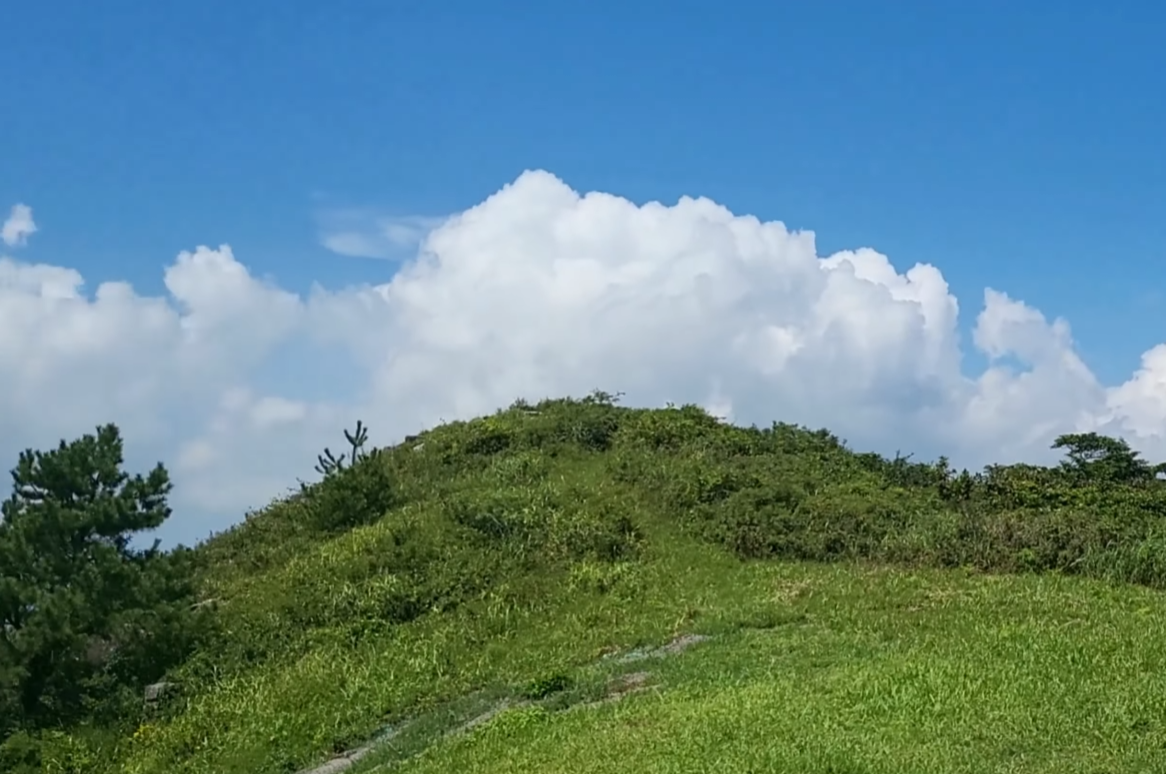
- The mountain (2023)

Highest point
- Elevation: 666 m (2,185 ft)

Geography
- Location: Jangheung and Boseong, Jeonnam-Gwangju, South Korea

Korean name
- Hangul: 사자산
- Hanja: 獅子山
- RR: Sajasan
- MR: Sajasan

Sajasan (Korean: 사자산) is a mountain in Jangheung and Boseong, Jeonnam-Gwangju, South Korea. It has an elevation of 666 m (2,185 ft).

== Description ==
The peak near Jangheung is called Dubong (570 m) as it resembles a lion's head. Mibong (667.5 m), located about 2 km away, is regarded as the lion's tail. With Illimsan, it is the origin of Boseong River. It is considered the thee mountains of Jangheung with Jeamsan and Eokbulsan.

== Names ==
Although Jeamsan and Sajasan are recognized as separate mountains today, a rock formation on the summit was called Jeam and the entire mountain range was called Sajasan during the Joseon dynasty. During the Japanese colonial period, Japanese settlers called it "Mount Fuji of Jangheung."

== See also ==
- List of mountains in Korea
