= Bancha =

Type of Japanese green tea

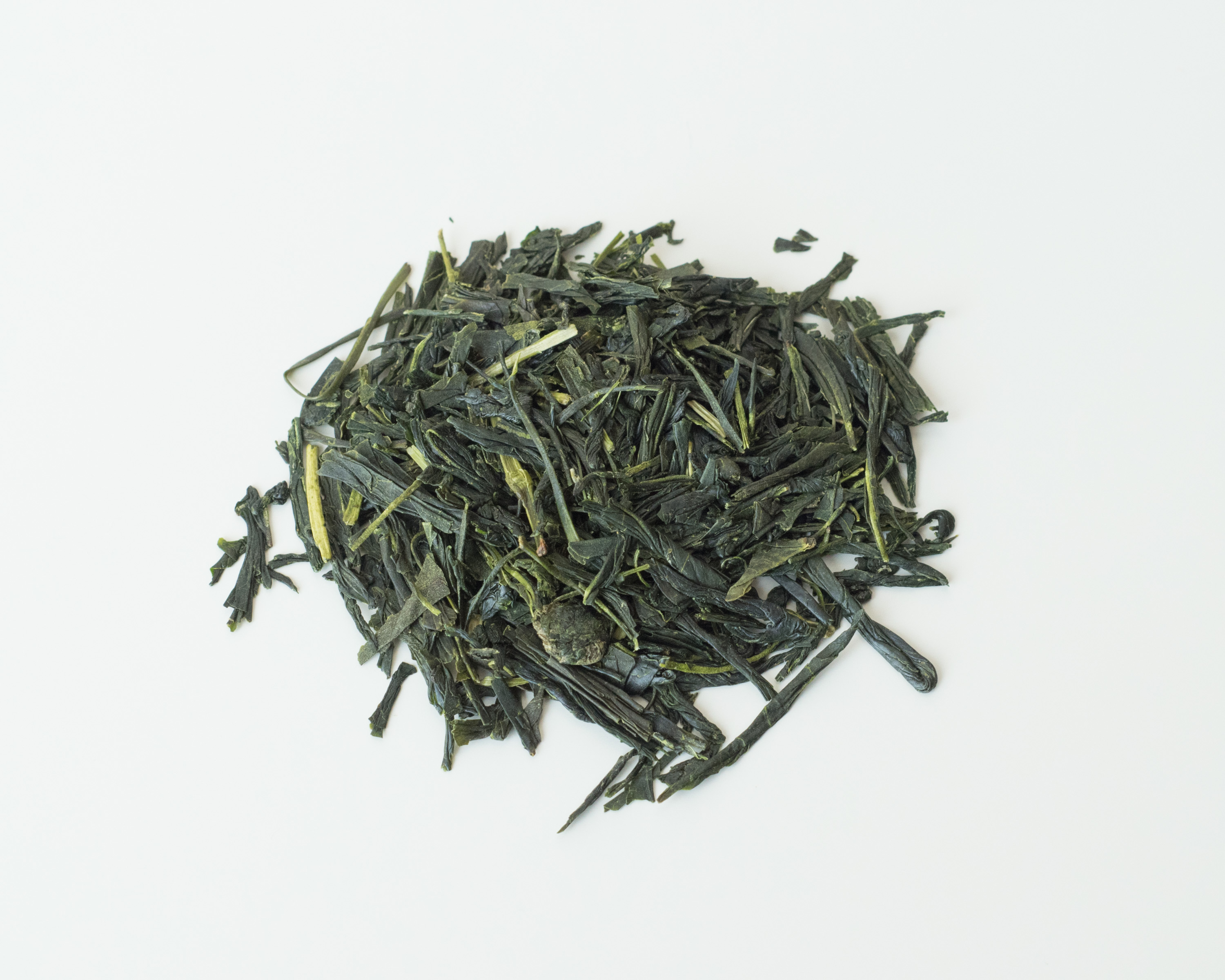
- Type: Green
- Other names: Common Tea
- Origin: Japan
- Quick description: More widely available in the West. A late season crop, goes well with food.

Bancha (番茶) is a type of Japanese green tea. It is harvested from the third and fourth flushes of sencha between summer and autumn.

It can be found in a number of forms such as roasted, unroasted, smoked, matured or fermented for three years and even post-fermented. For example, goishicha.

== Background ==
Bancha is harvested from the same tea tree as sencha grade, but it is plucked later than sencha is, giving it a lower market grade. It is considered to be one of the lowest grades of Japanese green teas. There are 22 grades of bancha. Its flavour is unique and varies depending on the type.

Flavours range from smoke, roasted nuts, green grass, earth, soil, wet leaves, some of the types of bancha have a stronger straw smell.

== See also ==
- Hōjicha – often made from bancha
- Japanese tea
- Tea Culture in Japan
