= Sajasan (Gangwon) =

Mountain in South Korea

Highest point
- Elevation: 1,120 m (3,670 ft)

Geography
- Location: South Korea

Korean name
- Hangul: 사자산
- Hanja: 獅子山
- RR: Sajasan
- MR: Sajasan

Sajasan (Korean: 사자산) is a South Korean mountain that sits between the counties of Pyeongchang, Yeongwol and Hoengseong, in Gangwon Province. It has an elevation of 1,120 m (3,675 ft).

== See also ==
- List of mountains in Korea
