= Jeamsan =

Mountain in Jeollanam-do, South Korea

Coordinates: 34°43′N 126°59′E

Highest point
- Elevation: 807 m (2,648 ft)

Geography
- Location: South Jeolla Province, South Korea

Jeamsan is a mountain of South Jeolla Province, southwestern South Korea. It has an elevation of 807 metres.

== See also ==
- List of mountains of Korea
