= Illimsan =

Mountain in South Korea

Coordinates: 34°41′N 127°02′E

Highest point
- Elevation: 668 m (2,192 ft)

Geography
- Location: South Jeolla Province, South Korea

Illimsan is a mountain of South Jeolla Province, southwestern South Korea. It has an elevation of 668 metres.

== See also ==
- List of mountains of Korea
