= Huiyangsan =

Mountain in North Gyeongsang Province, South Korea

Heiyangsan
- Location within South Korea

Highest point
- Elevation: 998 m (3,274 ft)
- Coordinates: 36°42′58″N 128°00′18″E

Geography
- Location: North Gyeongsang Province, South Korea

Korean name
- Hangul: 희양산
- Hanja: 曦陽山
- RR: Huiyangsan
- MR: Hŭiyangsan

Heiyangsan (Korean: 희양산) is a mountain in North Gyeongsang Province, South Korea. It has an elevation of 998 metres.

== See also ==
- List of mountains of Korea
