= Goishicha =

Type of fermented tea

Goishicha (Japanese: 碁石茶 'go-pebble tea') is a fermented tea originally from China but now grown only in Ōtoyo, Kōchi and Ishizuchi-Kurocha, Ehime prefecture. The tea is made by fermenting harvested tea in a two-step process, first with aerobic fungi, then with anaerobic bacteria.
