= Yeopjeon =

Korean coin

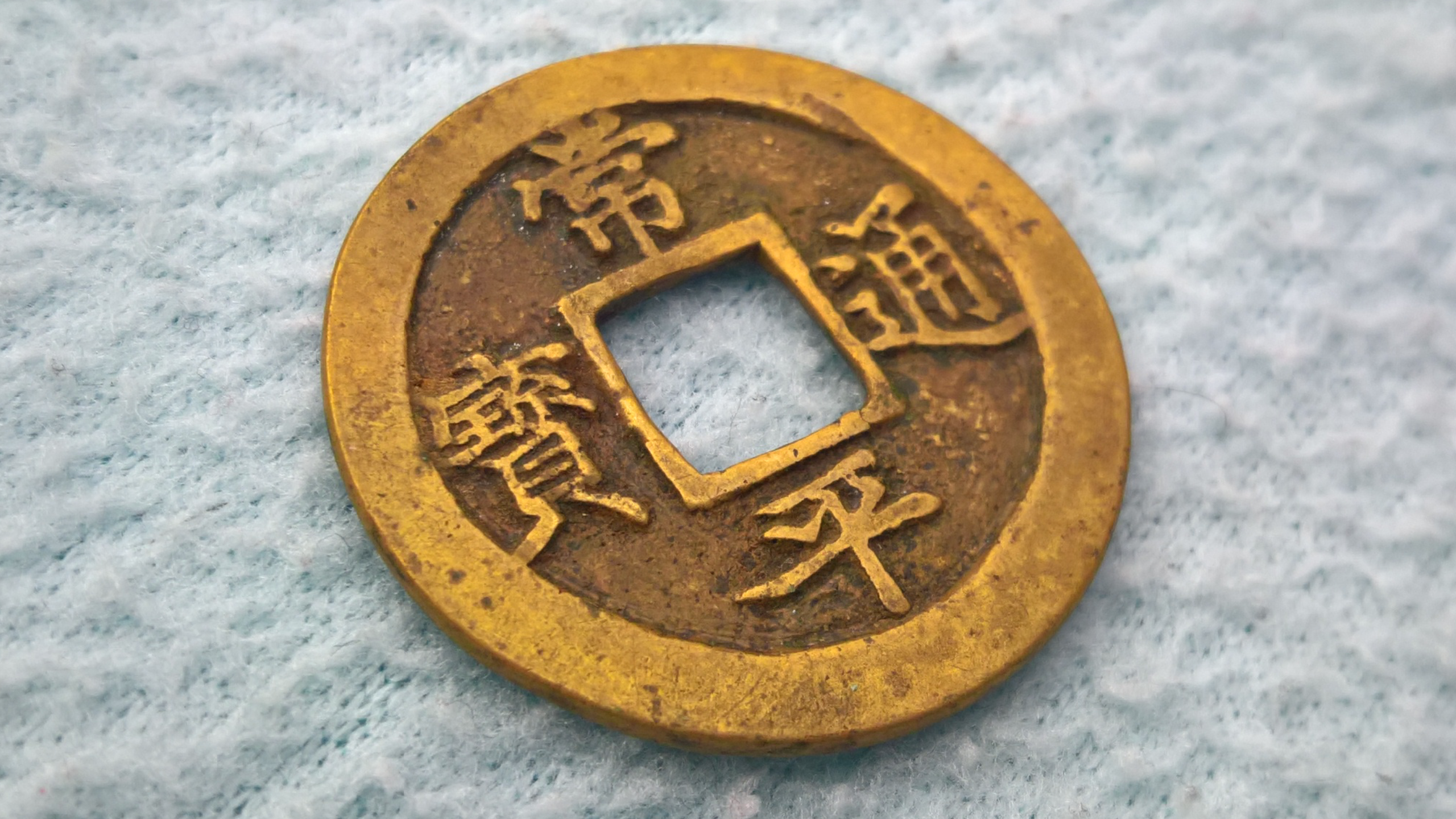
A Sangpyeong Tongbo (常平通寶) cash coin.

A yeopjeon (Korean: 엽전; Hanja: 葉錢; "leaf coin") was a Korean brass coin with a square cut out which was first issued in 1678 and continued until the final years of the Joseon period. Coins with a similar design had been unsuccessfully used during the earlier Goryeo period as well.

The Sangpyeong Tongbo (常平通寶) cash coins were known as yeopjeon because of the way that these cash coins resembled leaves on a branch when they were being cast in the casting mould. In the western world all coins with this design are commonly called "cash coins".

In 1908 the value of a yeopjeon was set at 0.2 chon (or 1/500 won).

== Modern influence ==
- At the Tong-in Market (통인시장), a small market that was established in 1941 during the Japanese occupation period for Seoul's Japanese residents outside of the Gyeongbok Palace, people can purchase token coins shaped like yeopjeon at shops which are members of the "Dosirak Café" (도시락) project to spend at around 70 food stores and restaurants. The shops where these yeopjeon tokens can be spend have a sign stating "通 도시락 cafe" and these tokens can be bought in strings of 10 yeopjeon. A single one of these yeopjeon tokens cost ₩500 in 2014.

== See also ==
- Cash (Chinese coin)
- Korean mun
