= Gajisan (Jeonnam-Gwangju) =

Mountain in South Korea

- Location within South Korea

Highest point
- Elevation: 510 m (1,670 ft)
- Coordinates: 34°49′12″N 126°54′10″E

Geography
- Location: South Jeolla Province, South Korea

Korean name
- Hangul: 가지산
- Hanja: 迦智山
- RR: Gajisan
- MR: Kajisan

Gajisan (Korean: 가지산) is a mountain in South Jeolla Province, southwestern South Korea. It has an elevation of 510 metres.

== See also ==
- List of mountains of Korea
