= Borimsa =

Temple in Jangheung, South Korea

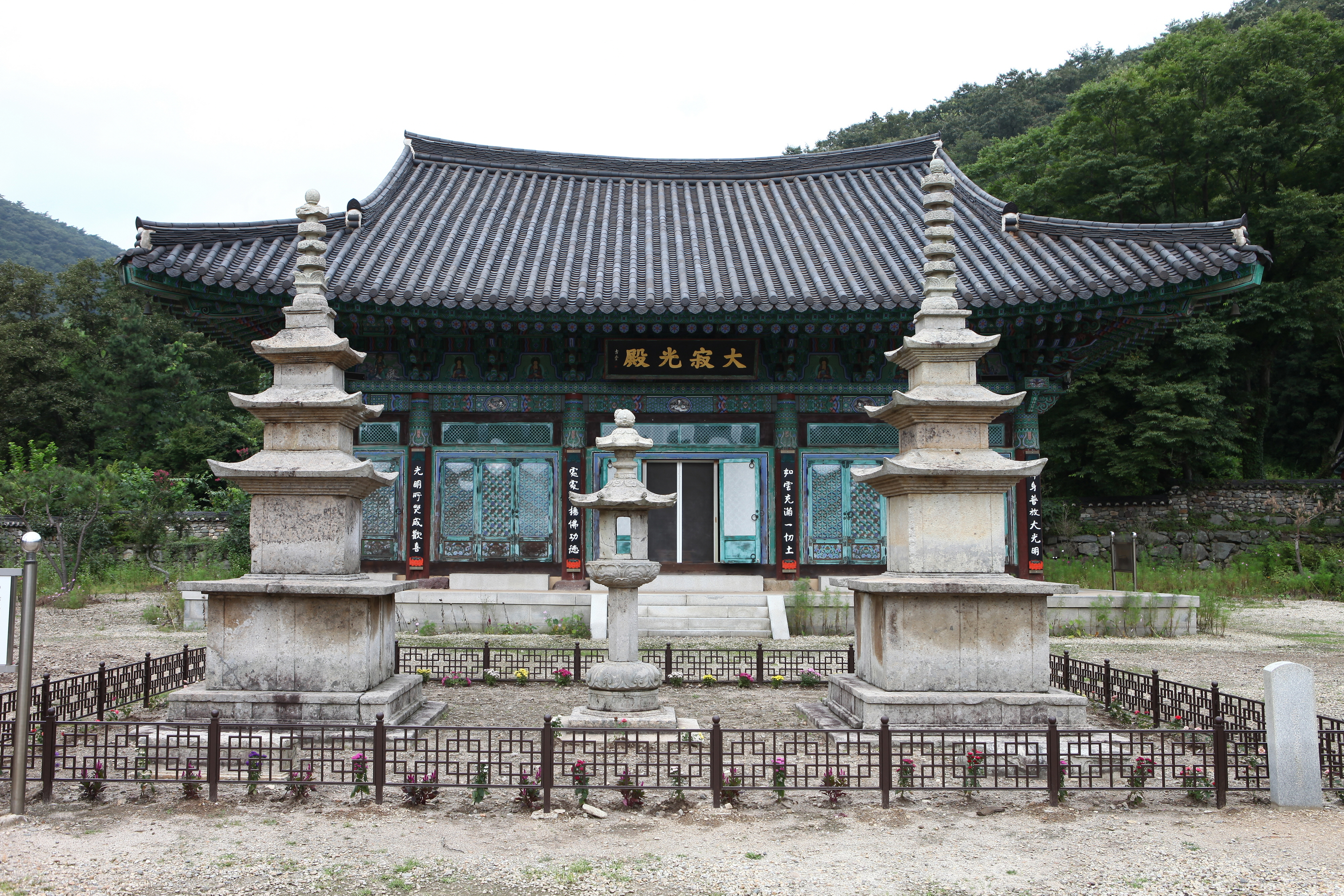
Borimsa Temple, Jangheung

Borimsa Temple (Korean: 보림사; Hanja: 寶林寺) is one of the oldest Korean temples on Gaji Mountain in Jangheung County, South Jeolla, South Korea. The temple holds great significance as the first Seon Buddhist temple during Unified Silla.

== Myth ==
The great monk Wonpyo, while studying in Borim temple in India and China, missed the good climate of the Korean peninsula, and returned to Silla, looking for a place to construct a temple. One day he paid a visit to Gaji Mountain in present Jangheung. All of sudden, a fairy appeared, telling him that nine dragons were wreaking havoc around the pond where she had been living. The monk threw a charm into the pool, expelling all the dragons except for a white dragon. Eventually, the white one also left but lost his tail in the nearby forest. That place became Yongmunso (용문소), meaning the pond was dug by the dragon's tail; the great monk claimed this place for founding his temple. Following this legend, local names include many elements related to yong (용, "dragon").

== History ==
During Unified Silla, nine temples in mountains of this area were considered significant Buddhist temples. Ilyeon, the author of Samgukyusa, one of the most prominent historic books about Korean history, also belonged to Borim Temple. In 860, King Heonan of Silla encouraged the great monk Chejing (체징) to build this temple, which later was named after temples of the same name in India and China.

In the 14th century, under the reign of Gongmin of Goryeo, the great monk Bowoo worked to harmonize different denominations in order to restrengthen Seon Buddhism in Korea. From the foundation of Joseon dynasty in 1392, several annexes of the temple were rebuilt and much enlarged. This was a difficult period, however, owing to Joeseon suppression of Buddhism.

During the Korean War, 20 annexes except for two gates were burned down in a punitive expedition sent by commanders who suspected the temple of housing partisan rebels. After the war, the temple underwent several restorations and now holds several national treasures.
