= Kenchin-jiru =

Japanese vegetable soup

Kenchin jiru
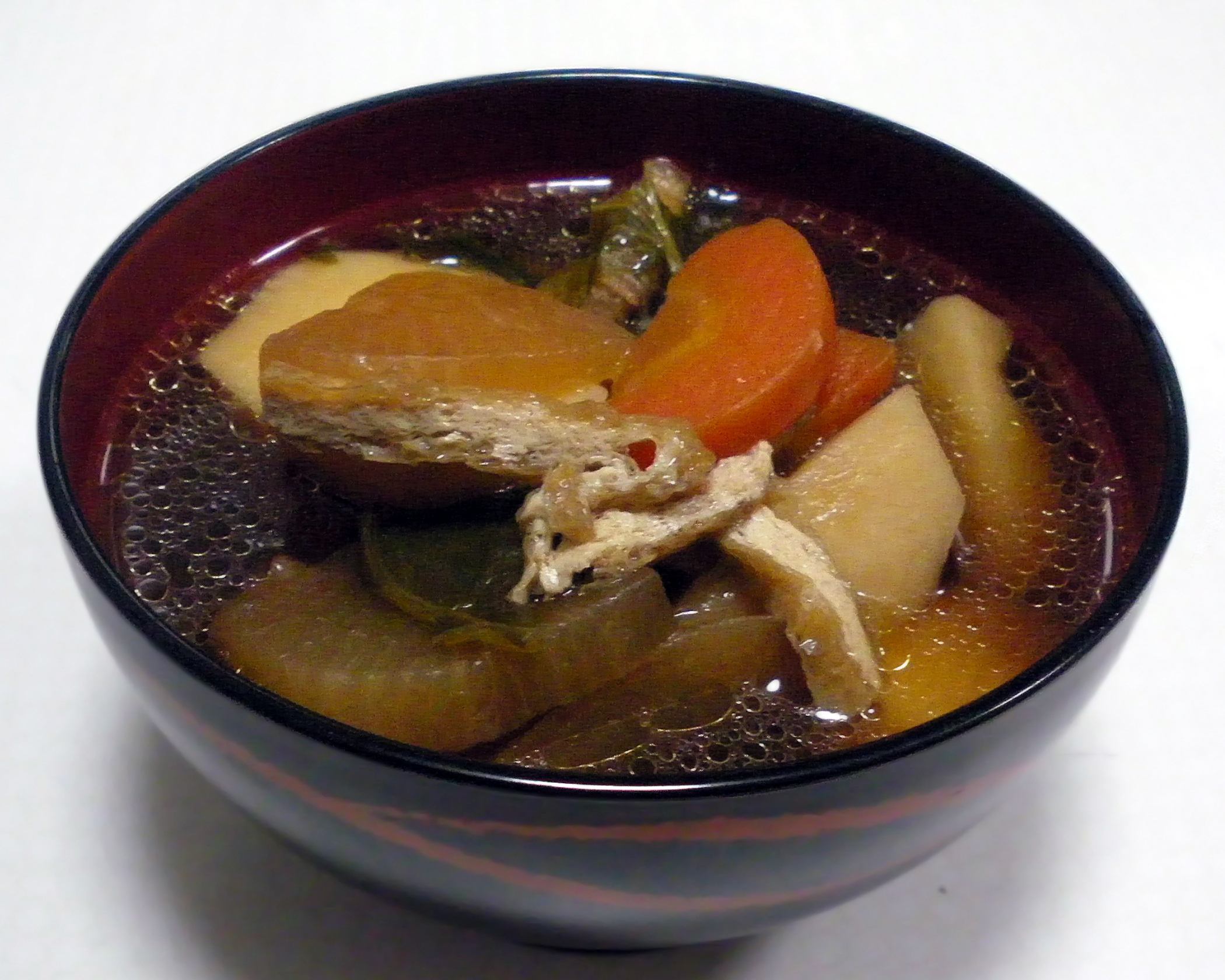
- Kenchin jiru
- Alternative names: Kenchin-jiru
- Type: Soup
- Place of origin: Japan
- Main ingredients: Root vegetables and tofu
- Ingredients generally used: Burdock root, daikon radish, shiitake mushrooms, konnyaku, taro root, sweet potato or potato, carrot, dashi stock, sesame oil, and seasonings

Kenchin jiru (けんちん汁, 巻繊汁 kenchinjiru), also spelled kenchin-jiru, and sometimes referred to simply as kenchin, is a Japanese vegetable soup prepared using root vegetables and tofu. It is a popular dish in Japan and is prepared in various manners using myriad ingredients. It has been stated that the dish originated several centuries ago from Kenchō-ji, a temple, and it has also been suggested that the dish has its roots in shippoku cuisine.

== Overview ==
Kenchin jiru is a Japanese vegetable soup prepared using root vegetables and tofu. Typical ingredients include tofu, burdock root, daikon radish, shiitake mushrooms, konnyaku, taro root, sweet potato or potato, carrot, dashi stock, sesame oil, and seasonings. The vegetables and roots can be stir-fried prior to being added to the soup, which reduces their moisture content to accentuate their flavors. Meats such as pork and chicken are sometimes used as an ingredient.

It is a popular dish in Japan, where it is prepared in many various ways using various ingredients.

== History ==
It has been suggested that kenchin jiru originated from Kenchō-ji, located in Kamakura, Kanagawa Prefecture, Japan, which was the first Buddhist Zen Temple in Japan. A story regarding the dish's origin is that several centuries ago, a young monk accidentally dropped a fresh tofu cake on the kitchen floor of the temple. The kitchen floor was kept in a very clean state, so the cook used the tofu in a soup for the evening meal. After this occurred, tofu used thereafter when preparing the soup was routinely crushed or crumbled into small pieces, which was based upon a Zen belief that food should be divided equally among the residents of a temple.

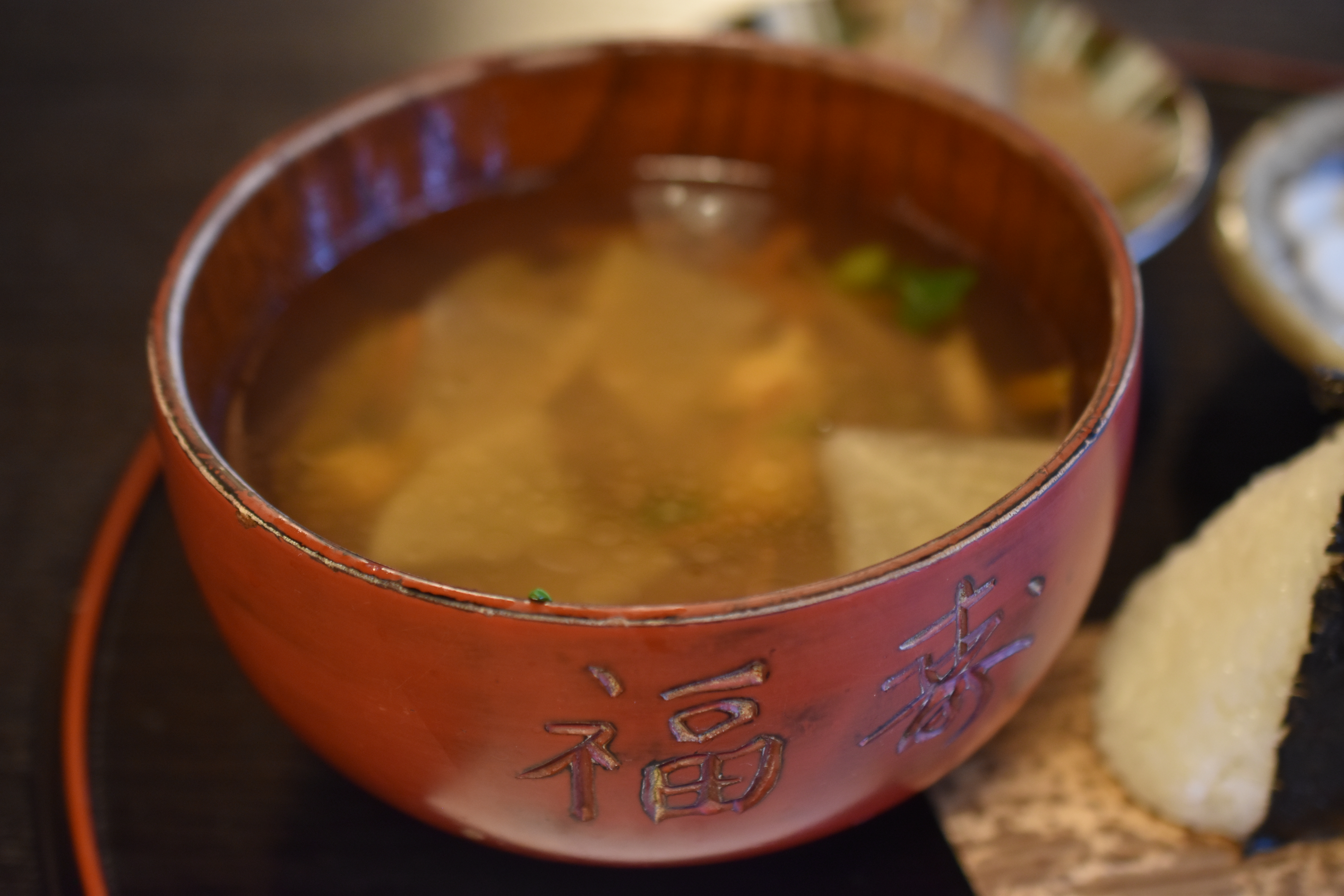
Kenchin-jiru served at Tenshin-an, Kamakura, made according to the temple's recipe.

It has also been suggested that the dish had its roots in shippoku cuisine, which is a Japanese culinary style that is heavily influenced by Chinese cuisine. Shippoku cuisine originated from Chinese immigrants who went to Nagasaki, Japan, during the Edo period. Nagasaki was the only place in Japan where Chinese people were allowed to reside during the "centuries of seclusion". Kenchin jiru's connection with shippoku cuisine is also demonstrated per the derivation of the word kenchin from the Chinese word kenchen, which means "rolled parched food" or "rolled slivers of food". A well-known variation of kenchin jiru is prepared by rolling cooked vegetables and tofu in yuba (tofu skin) and then deep-frying the roll, rather than serving it as a soup.

== See also ==
- List of Japanese soups and stews
- List of soups
