= Ojiya =

Ojiya may refer to:

- Ojiya, Niigata, a city in Japan
- Ojiya, another name for zosui, a mild Japanese rice soup
