= Hōtō =

Japanese noodle soup dish

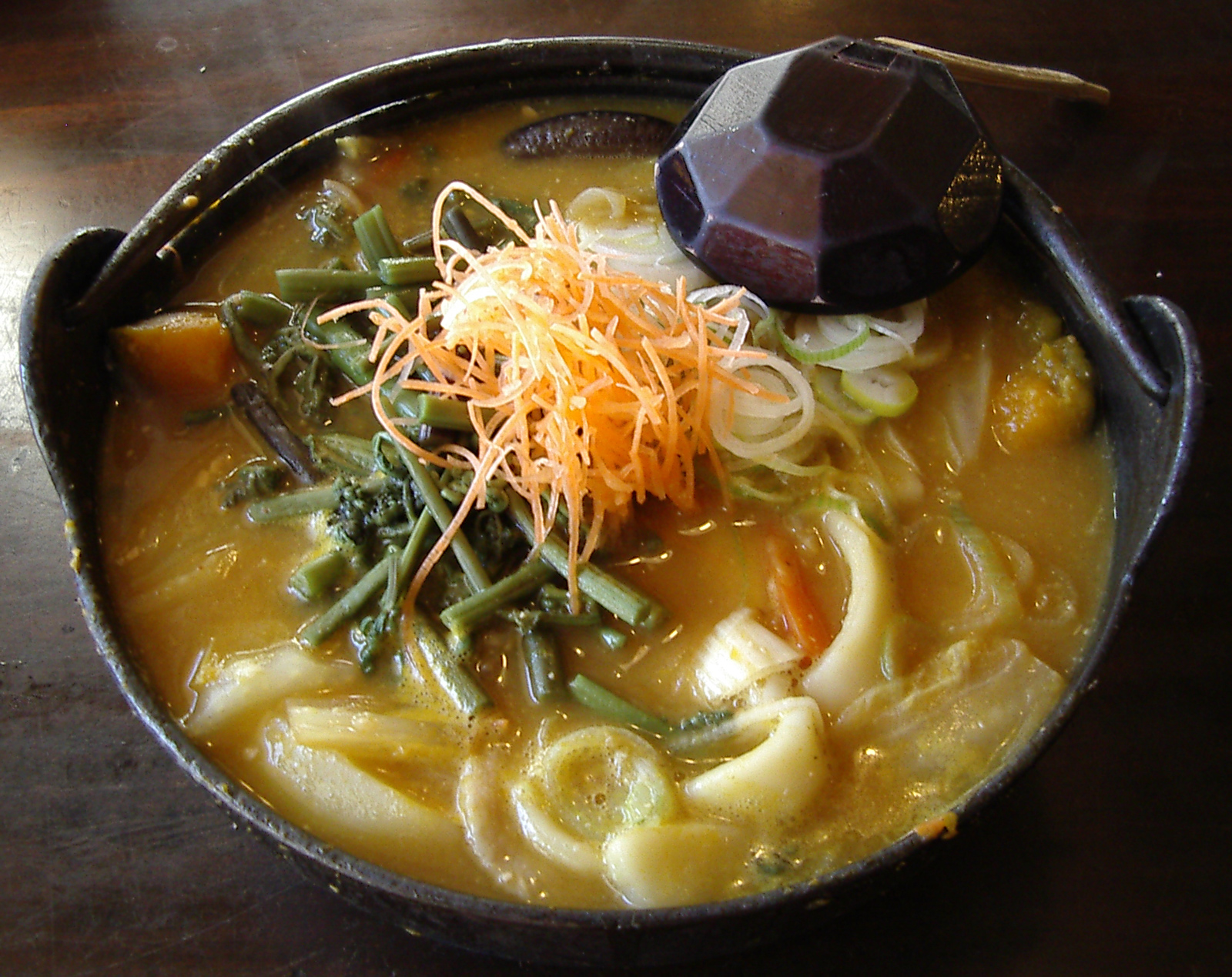
- Type: Soup
- Place of origin: Japan
- Region or state: Yamanashi Prefecture
- Main ingredients: Miso soup, udon noodles, vegetables

Hōtō (ほうとう) is a noodle soup and popular regional dish originating from Yamanashi, Japan made by stewing flat udon noodles and vegetables in miso soup. Though hōtō is commonly recognized as a variant of udon, locals do not consider it to be an udon dish because the dough is prepared in the style of dumplings rather than noodles.

== Origins ==
Wheat farming and the flour culture were brought into Yamanashi prefecture due to shortages in local rice crops. Sericulture had turned lands traditionally reserved for rice crops into silk farms, and flour products like hōtō were invented as a means to counter food shortages which arose from this change in agriculture.

This transition may have begun in Yamanashi's Gunnai region, where rice farming was impossible to start due to cold temperature and large amounts of volcanic debris embedded into the soil. Wheat farming spread through the rest of the prefecture and into the neighboring Nagano, Shizuoka, Saitama, and Gunma prefectures, where similar cuisine using flour dough and soup can also be found. For example, a dish called nibōtō, which is identical to hōtō except with a soy sauce-flavored soup, can be found throughout Saitama and Gunma prefectures.

=== Takeda Shingen ===
Another prevalent theory suggests that hōtō was invented by local warlord Takeda Shingen. The redevelopment of industry and commerce after World War II made tourism the prefecture's most profitable enterprise, and the image of Takeda Shingen was used frequently to promote the area's regional products. Locals sought to popularize hōtō as a tourist food by advertising it as the meal consumed by Takeda Shingen and his soldiers before each battle. Modern-day tourists can enjoy hōtō in numerous local restaurants and in rather unlikely locations such as coffee shops and ice cream parlors.

A more extreme branch of these advertisements claims that the descendants of the Takeda clan introduced the recipe to the Tokugawa shogunate, who then used it to develop Nagoya's miso-nikomi udon. The validity of this statement remains highly speculative.

== Etymology ==
=== Chinese origin theory ===
The name hōtō is commonly thought to be a euphony of hakutaku (餺飥); the name for udon flour after it has been kneaded and cut.

The kanji "餺飥" first appeared in Nara period dictionaries, and their reading is listed in dictionaries of the cloistered rule period as hautau, showing that the pronunciation had already begun to transform into the reading hōtō. Though hōtō was introduced to Japan far earlier than udon, both names are believed to have originated from China. For instance, in modern-day Shanxi province of China, the word wonton is written with similar kanji (餛飩), and is pronounced "hōtō." The Southern Song poet Lu You (1125-1210) mentioned 馎饦 in one of his poems.

=== Local origin theory ===
Local linguists point out that the word is used in Edo period documents to describe all sorts of flour products, including flour made from non-wheat crops. In the local dialect, the word for flour is hatakimono, while the local word for grinding crops into powder is hataku. Some linguists theorize that hōtō actually originated from these local words when flour was turned into a popular dish.

Other linguists disagree with the Chinese origin theory because there is no conclusive evidence that the word originated from China. They argue that popular acceptance of hōtō as a cuisine found exclusively in the Yamanashi area voids theories stating that the word was imported from overseas. However, from a historical viewpoint, the word hataku first appears in documents around 1484 in the Muromachi period, while hōtō or hautau can be found much earlier in writings such as The Pillow Book. This contradicts the idea that hataku was the basis for the name of the dish.

=== Other theories ===
The word can also be thought of as a euphony of "宝刀" or "放蕩". For "宝刀" (treasure sword), the given explanation is that Takeda Shingen cut the ingredients for the dish with his own sword. However, linguists tend to view this idea as a clever play on words in an advertisement campaign rather than a legitimate theory.

== Preparation and ingredients ==
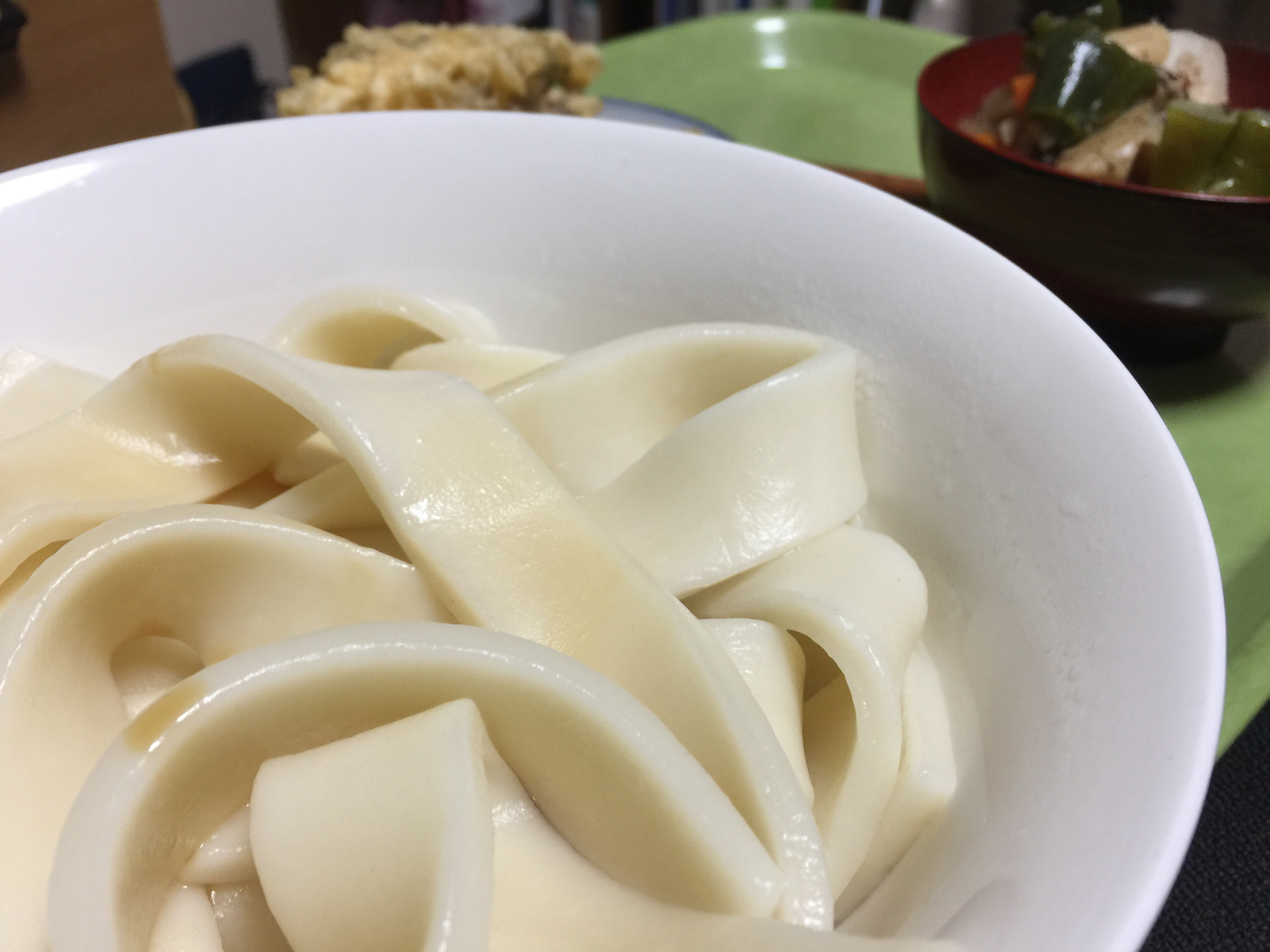
Flat noodles used in hōtō

The dough is kneaded with bare hands in a wooden bowl, and stretched out to dry. It is then folded over and cut into large pieces with a kitchen knife. Unlike udon, hōtō requires a tougher texture of dough, brought about by the amount of gluten, and the dough is not mixed with salt or left to sit. One peculiarity is that the noodles do not need to be parboiled; they are boiled raw along with the other ingredients.

It is generally thought that the best taste is brought out by boiling pumpkin in the miso soup until it becomes tender and melts into pieces. The dashi (soup base) is made from niboshi, which are often left in the soup in home-cooked meals. Vegetables differ by season; negi, onions, and potatoes are commonly included during the summer, while taro, carrots, and Chinese cabbage make up the winter ingredients, along with various types of mushrooms such as shiitake and shimeji. Pork or chicken can be included by preference. In terms of nutrition value, hōtō provides large amounts of starch from the noodles and potatoes, and vitamins and fiber from the soup and vegetables.

Most hōtō noodles are wider and flatter compared to regular udon noodles. Though it is a hearty meal on its own, it can be served with white rice in the same manner as miso soup. Some restaurants will serve hōtō with very thick, heavy noodles in large iron pots to bring about a voluminous feeling reminiscent of nabemono and other steamboat dishes.

== Azuki bean hōtō ==
Azuki-bōtō (小豆ぼうとう, azuki bōtō) refers to red bean soup with hōtō noodles added instead of the traditional mochi or shiratama. Though red bean soup usually has a watery texture, azuki-bōtō consists of a thick, gluey stew, which is placed on the hōtō noodles and eaten like botamochi. A local dish from Ōita Prefecture called yaseuma (やせうま) is extremely similar to azuki-bōtō, except sweeter and considered to be more of a snack rather than a meal. In this sense, hōtō differs significantly from the modern categorization of udon. Azuki-bōtō is not common, even within Yamanashi prefecture, and is usually only found in the old Kai province region. However, some local chain restaurants list azuki-bōtō on their regular menu.

== Hōtō and the people of Yamanashi ==
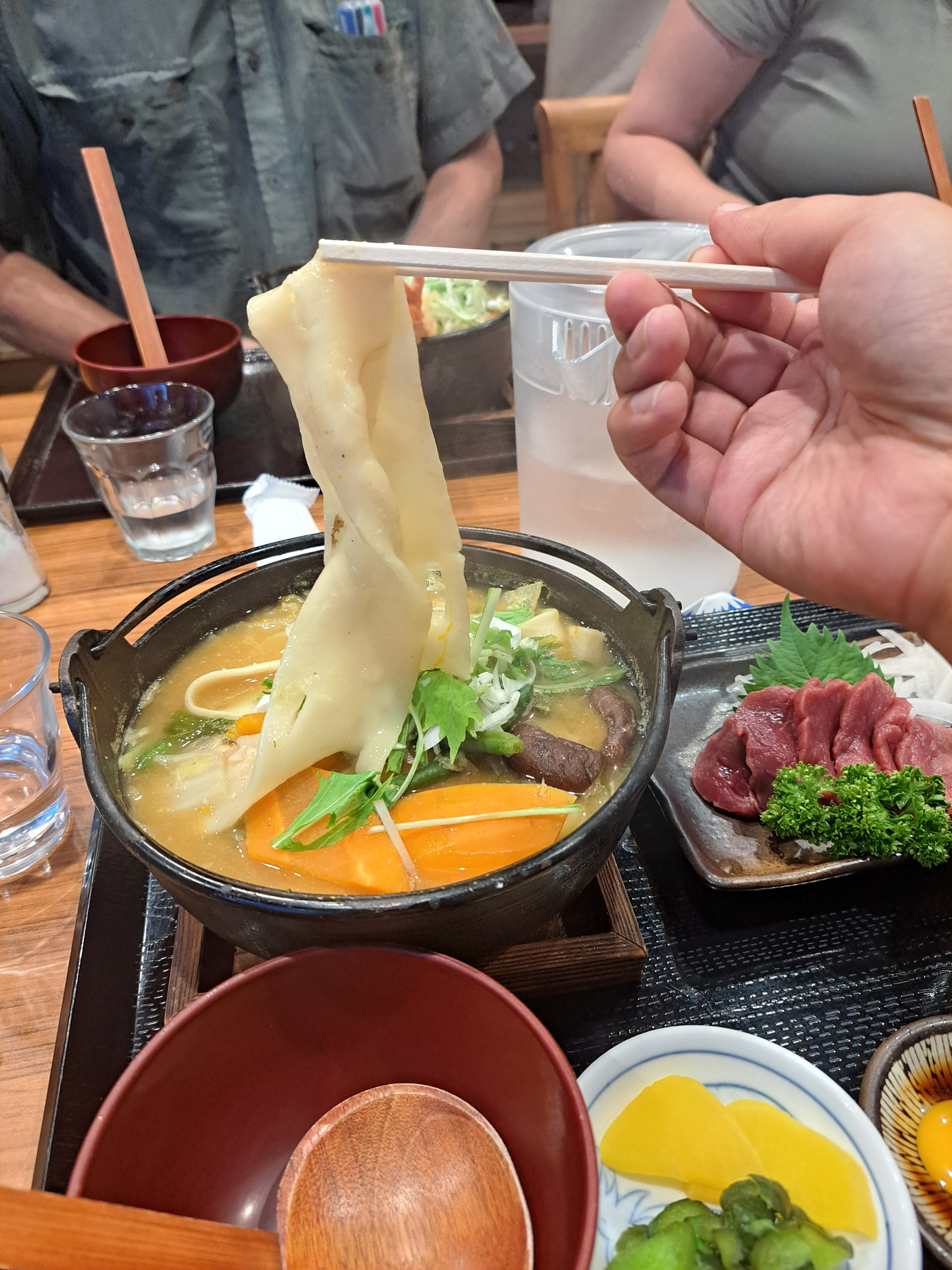
Hōtō served with basashi (horse sashimi)

It is customary for stores in Yamanashi prefecture to display Shingen Takeda's Fūrinkazan battle flag to signify that hōtō is being served. According to the people of Yamanashi, hōtō and udon are completely different and unrelated foods (similar to the way kishimen (きしめん) is regarded by the people of Nagoya).

Traditionally, each household would knead the dough from flour on their own. It was a popular dish amongst women who worked all day outside and needed to prepare dinner for a large farming family because the recipe and the process of making hōtō was not time-consuming or complicated. The soup usually consisted of larger quantities of vegetables than noodles, since flour was scarce and expensive. Many households reserved noodles as a treat served only to distinguished guests.

As modernization and industrialization of Japan continued, rice became the mainstay and the popularity of hōtō as a household dish dwindled. Supermarkets in Yamanashi now sell pre-packaged hōtō noodles and miso paste, and very few households go through the process of kneading their own flour anymore. Hōtō has gradually become standardized in taste and recipe, disappearing from household meals.

Many chain restaurants in Yamanashi have picked up on hōtō as a marketable food. Some only serve it in the traditional style with a miso base, while others use the aforementioned red bean soup or gochujang to create more variety in taste. Non-traditional ingredients such as oysters, turtle, and crab may also be included in some cases. These versions are often regarded as monstrosities by local residents, as the original simple dish arose out of poverty, but they have gained popularity among tourists.

== See also ==
- Ramen
- Soba
- List of Japanese soups and stews
- List of noodle dishes
