= Chankonabe =

Japanese hot pot dish

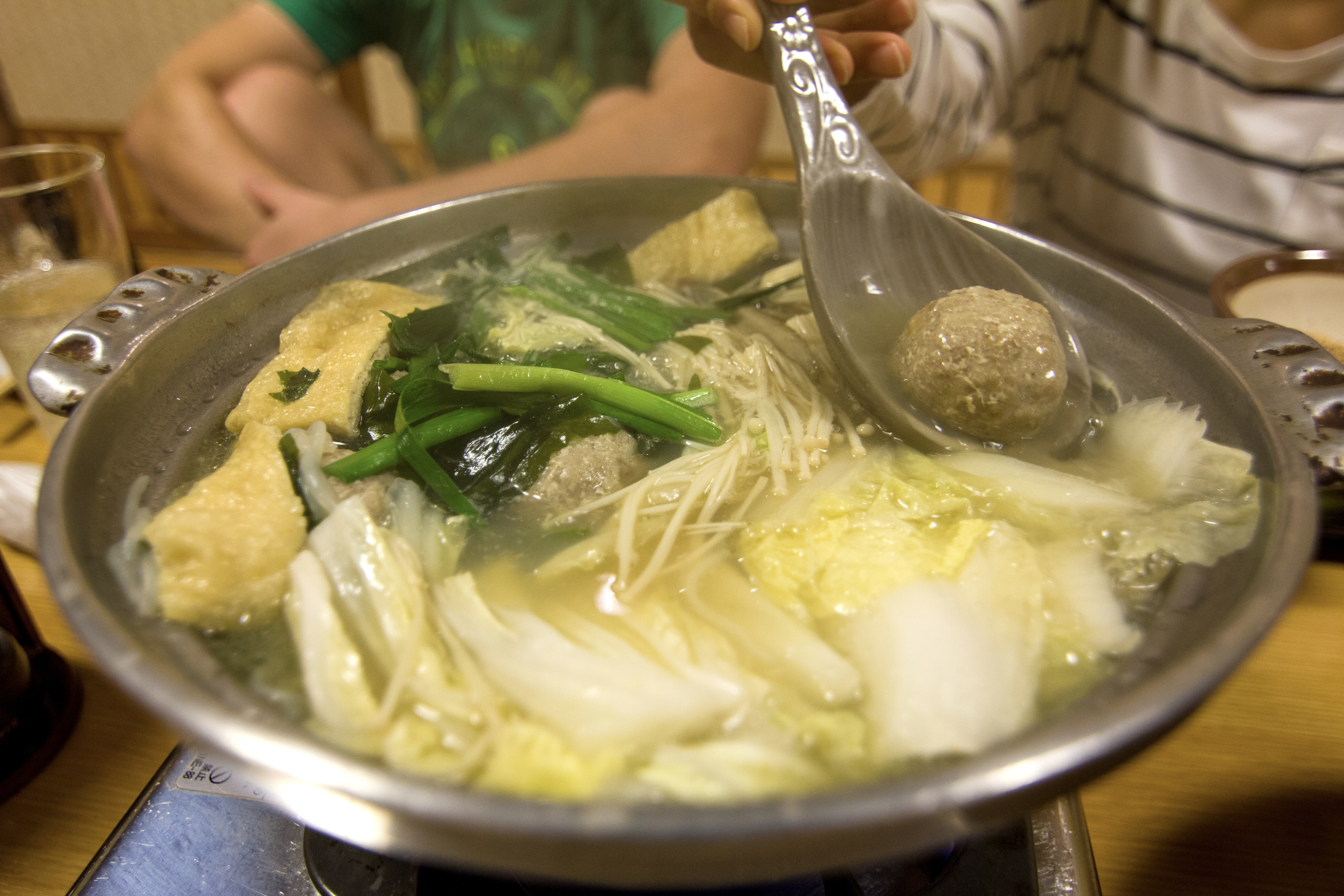
- Type: Stew
- Place of origin: Japan
- Main ingredients: Dashi or chicken broth, sake or mirin, chicken or fish, tofu, vegetables (daikon, bok choy, and others)

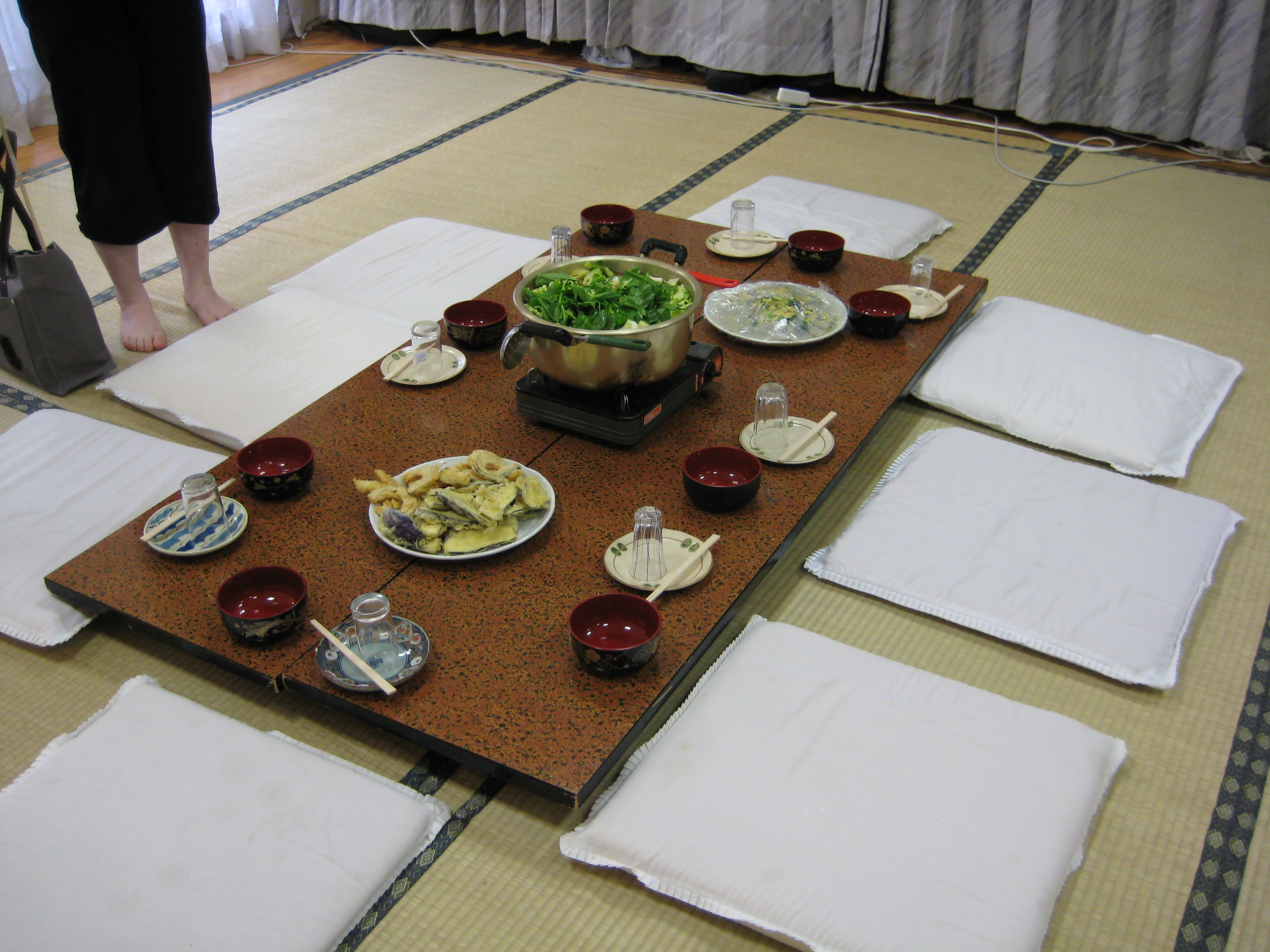
Chanko set

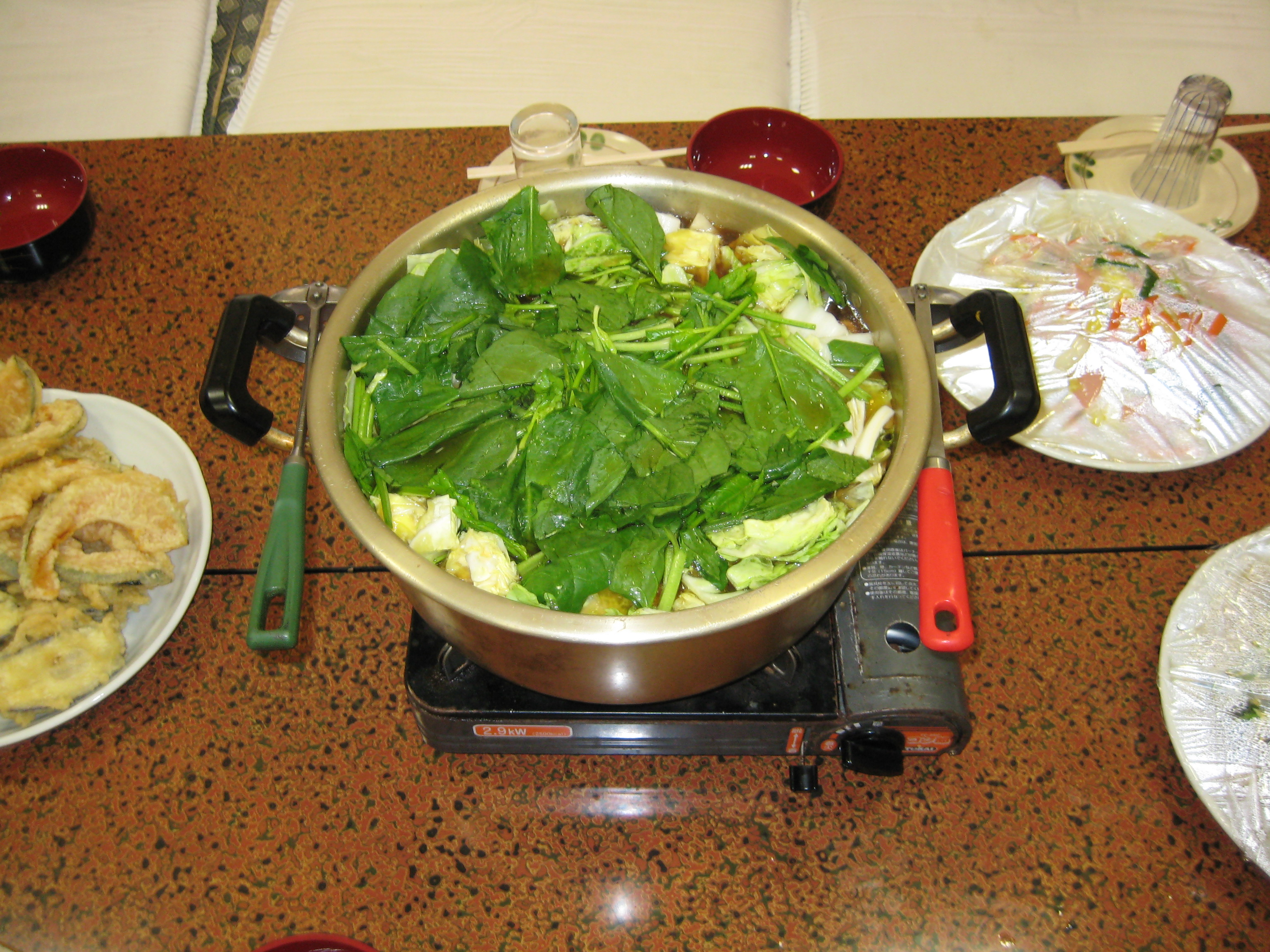
One example of chankonabe

In Japanese cuisine, chankonabe (Japanese: ちゃんこ鍋), also known as chanko or sumo stew, is a stew (a type of nabemono or one-pot dish) commonly eaten in vast quantities by sumo wrestlers while trying to gain weight.

== Ingredients and consumption ==
The dish contains a dashi or chicken broth soup base with sake or mirin to add flavor. The dish is not made according to a fixed recipe and often contains whatever is available to the cook; the bulk is made up of large quantities of protein sources such as chicken (quartered, skin left on), fish (fried and made into balls), tofu, or sometimes beef, and vegetables (daikon, bok choy, etc.).

While considered a reasonably healthy dish in its own right, chankonabe is very protein-rich and usually served in massive quantities. Modern sumo wrestlers typically accompany the stew with copious amounts of rice — often five to ten bowls per meal — along with beer, in order to increase caloric intake. Leftover chankonabe broth can also later be used as broth for sōmen or udon noodles.

Despite their size, active sumo wrestlers have been found to carry unusually low levels of visceral fat — the metabolically active fat stored around the internal organs — and instead store most of their body fat as subcutaneous fat just beneath the skin. Researchers attribute this in part to their intense daily training and to a diet that, despite its caloric load, is relatively low in sugar, processed foods, and added oils, which helps active wrestlers maintain near-normal blood glucose, triglyceride, and cholesterol levels.

Chankonabe is traditionally served according to seniority, with the senior wrestlers and any guests of the sumo stable receiving first choice, and the junior wrestlers getting whatever is left.

== Origin and customs ==
Chankonabe is also a popular restaurant food, often served in restaurants operated by retired sumo wrestlers who specialize in the dish; the first of these, Kawasaki Chanko, was started in 1937 in the Ryōgoku district of Tokyo, home to many prominent sumo stables.

Chankonabe served during sumo tournaments is made exclusively with chicken, the idea being that a wrestler should always be on two legs like a chicken, and not on all fours.

== See also ==
- Glossary of sumo terms
- List of Japanese soups and stews
- Nabemono
