= Zosui =

Japanese rice and vegetable soup

Zōsui
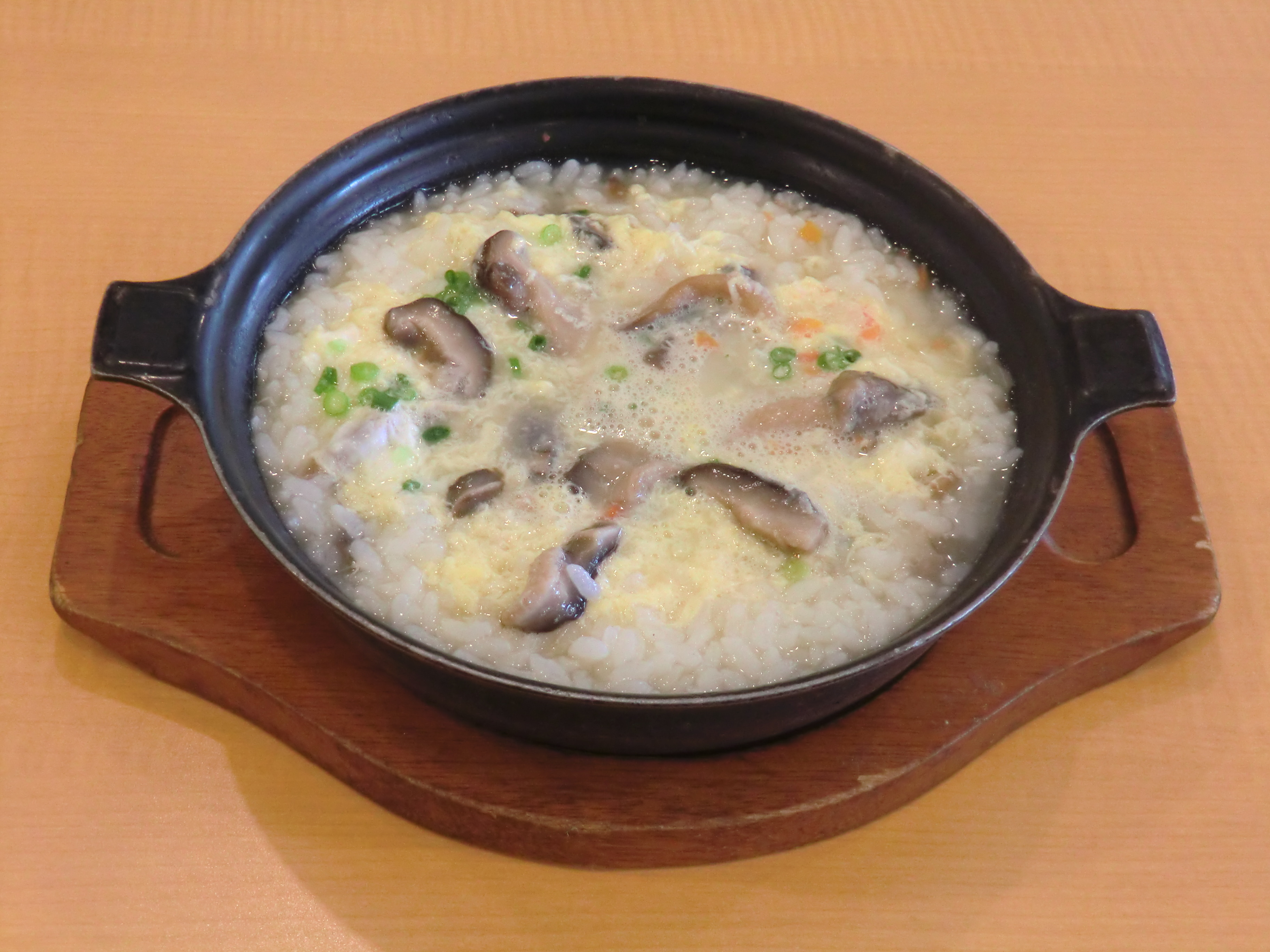
- Mushroom zōsui
- Alternative names: Ojiya
- Type: Soup
- Place of origin: Japan
- Main ingredients: Rice, water

Zōsui (雑炊; literally "miscellaneous cooking"), or ojiya (おじや), is a mild and thin Japanese rice soup akin to a rice-based vegetable soup. It is made from pre-cooked rice and dashi or water seasoned with either soy sauce or miso and cooked with other ingredients such as meat, seafood, mushrooms, and vegetables. It is generally served to those who are sick or otherwise feeling unwell, and is usually only served in the winter.

Leftover soup from nabe is often re-used for zosui. Instead of rice, udon and ramen noodles are recent alternatives.

== History ==
In the days when it was difficult to keep cooked rice warm, the only way to reuse cold rice was to combine it with miso soup, so this was widely done in households across Japan. Nowadays, it is more often used to make meals for the sick or those feeling unwell rather than in everyday meals.

== Varieties ==
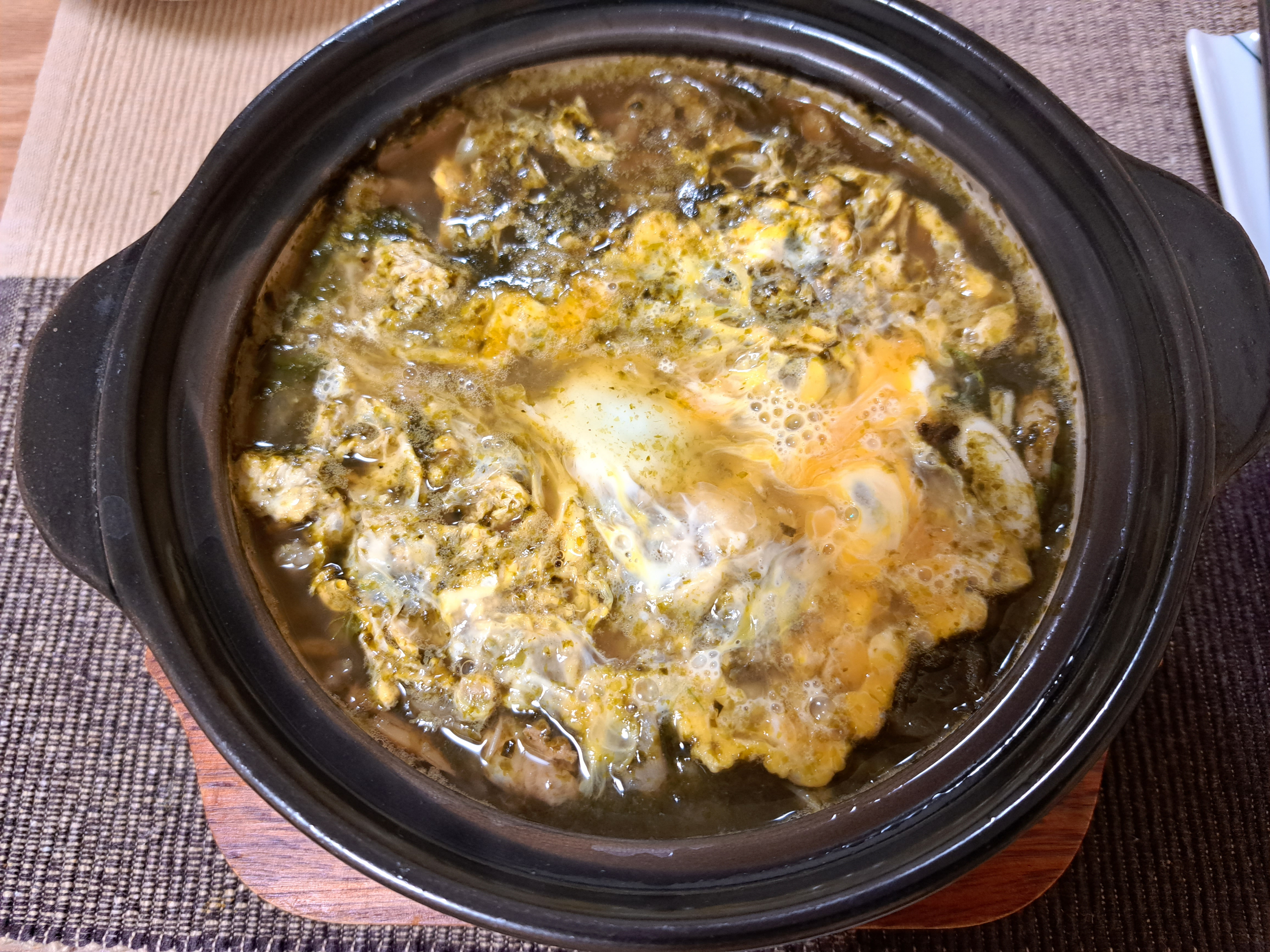
Zōsui with seaweed and egg

There are a number of varieties of zōsui, including maru zōsui (まる雑炊) (made with Chinese softshell turtle), fugu zōsui (ふぐ雑炊) (made with pufferfish), tori zōsui (とり雑炊) (made with chicken), kani zōsui (かに雑炊) (made with crab), sukiyaki zōsui (すきやき雑炊), and shabu-shabu zōsui (しゃぶしゃぶ雑炊). For home cooking, leftover broth and rice is combined with whatever ingredients are at hand.

== Ojiya ==
The word ojiya often has the same meaning as zōsui, but was created as part of the nyōbō kotoba, or "court ladies cant". Its origins are unclear, though it has been suggested that it came from the sound made by the rice cooking, or possibly from olla, the Spanish word for ceramic cookware (pronounced oja (オジャ) in Japanese).

Many people use the words ojiya and zosui interchangeably, and usage varies by region and household. However, the following list shows some common differences between them:

- Zōsui is prepared by rinsing the rice first to increase its stickiness. This is not the case with ojiya.
- In zōsui, the broth and rice are brought to a boil together, preserving the shape of the rice. With ojiya, the shape of the rice is not preserved when boiled together with the broth. The rice grains fall apart and distort in shape.
- While being flavored with miso or soy sauce, the broth in ojiya remains light or white in color. In contrast, the broth of zosui is only flavored with soy sauce.

== Related tradition ==
=== Ryukyu Islands ===
In Okinawan cuisine, zōsui include jūshī. Jūshī (Okinawan: ジューシー), originally jūshīmē (Okinawan: ジューシーメー)) is considered to be derived from zōsui. However, it is generally made with uncooked rice and far more water is used when making it. This is the origin for the name jūshī. Strictly speaking, these rice dishes are called kufajūshī (Okinawan: クファジューシー or katai jūshī (Japanese: 固いジューシー), literally "firm jūshī"). The zōsui of Japanese cuisine corresponds to yafarā jūshī (Okinawan: ヤファラージューシー or yawarakai jūshī (Japanese: 柔らかいジューシー, lit. 'soft jūshī'), in Ryukyuan cuisine.

There are a huge variety of styles in which this is made, including using large amounts of lard or margarine. Ingredients like ribs, hijiki, carrots, shiitake, and konjac jelly are also commonly used. Yafarā jūshī commonly contains ribs or pork, yomogi leaves (fūchibā,Okinawan: フーチバー), potato leaves (kandabā, Okinawan: カンダバー), and taro (chinnuku, Okinawan: チンヌク).

== See also ==
- Okayu, a dish made of rice cooked to a watery consistency
- List of Japanese soups and stews
