= Cream stew =

Japanese dish

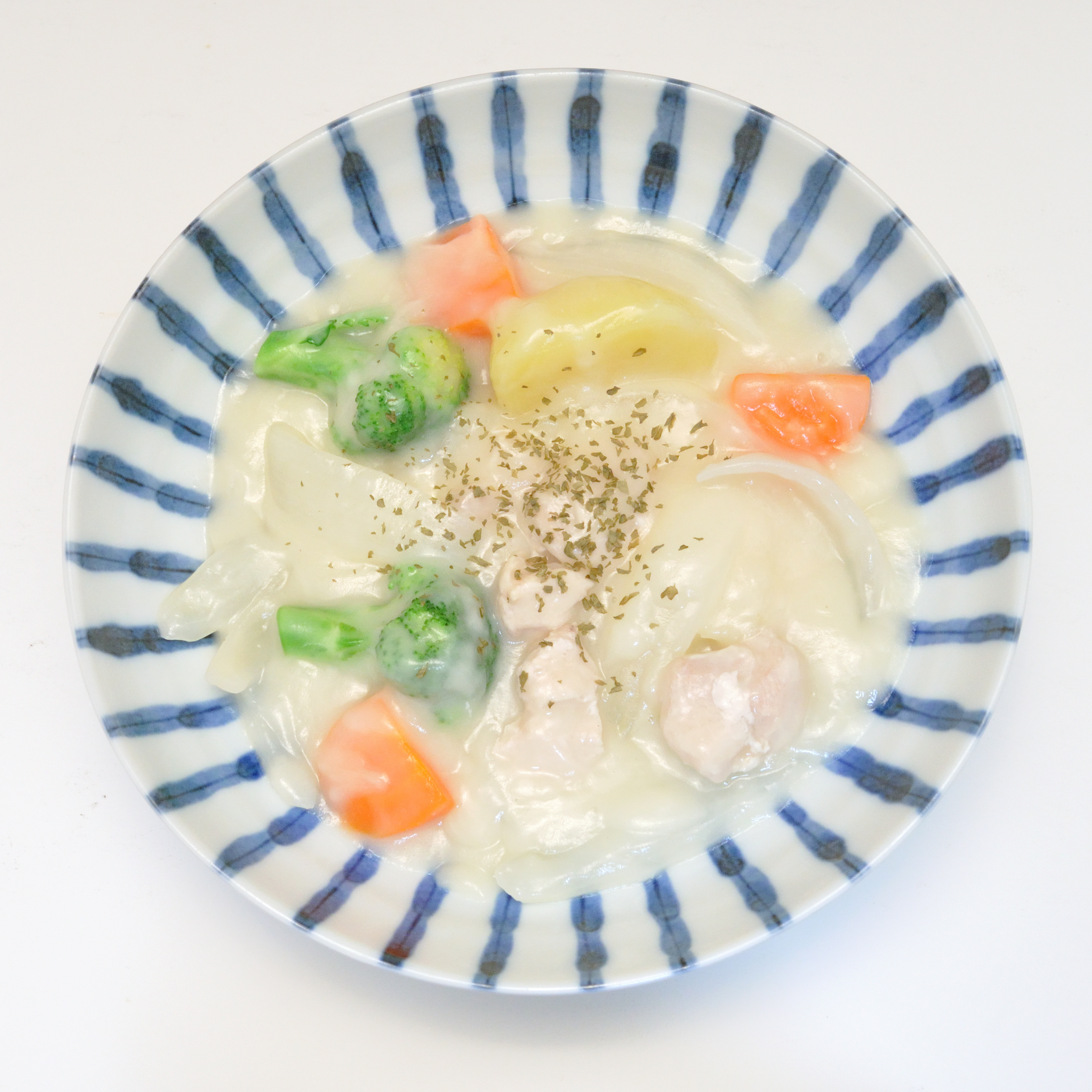
- Type: Soup
- Place of origin: Japan
- Main ingredients: Meat (usually chicken or pork), vegetables, onion, carrot, potato, cabbage, white roux, water

Cream stew (クリームシチュー, kurīmu shichū) is a popular yōshoku dish consisting of meat, usually chicken or pork, and mixed vegetables, onion, carrot, potato, and cabbage, cooked in thick white roux. The vegetables are sauteed before the meat is added with some water. The surface fats are removed by degreasing, and then the roux is added. It is common in Japan to use ready-made roux, for making Japanese curry, which comes in a block from a box. The roux can also be cooked from scratch. The hard-paste roux melts from the heat and blends with the water to create a thick stew. Milk can also be used as a replacement for water to make the stew more creamy.

== See also ==
- List of Japanese soups and stews
- Glico
- House Foods In 1966, Japan's first commercially available cream stew mix, "Cream Stew Mix," was launched. It was inspired by Irish stew.
