= Harihari-nabe =

Japanese whale dish

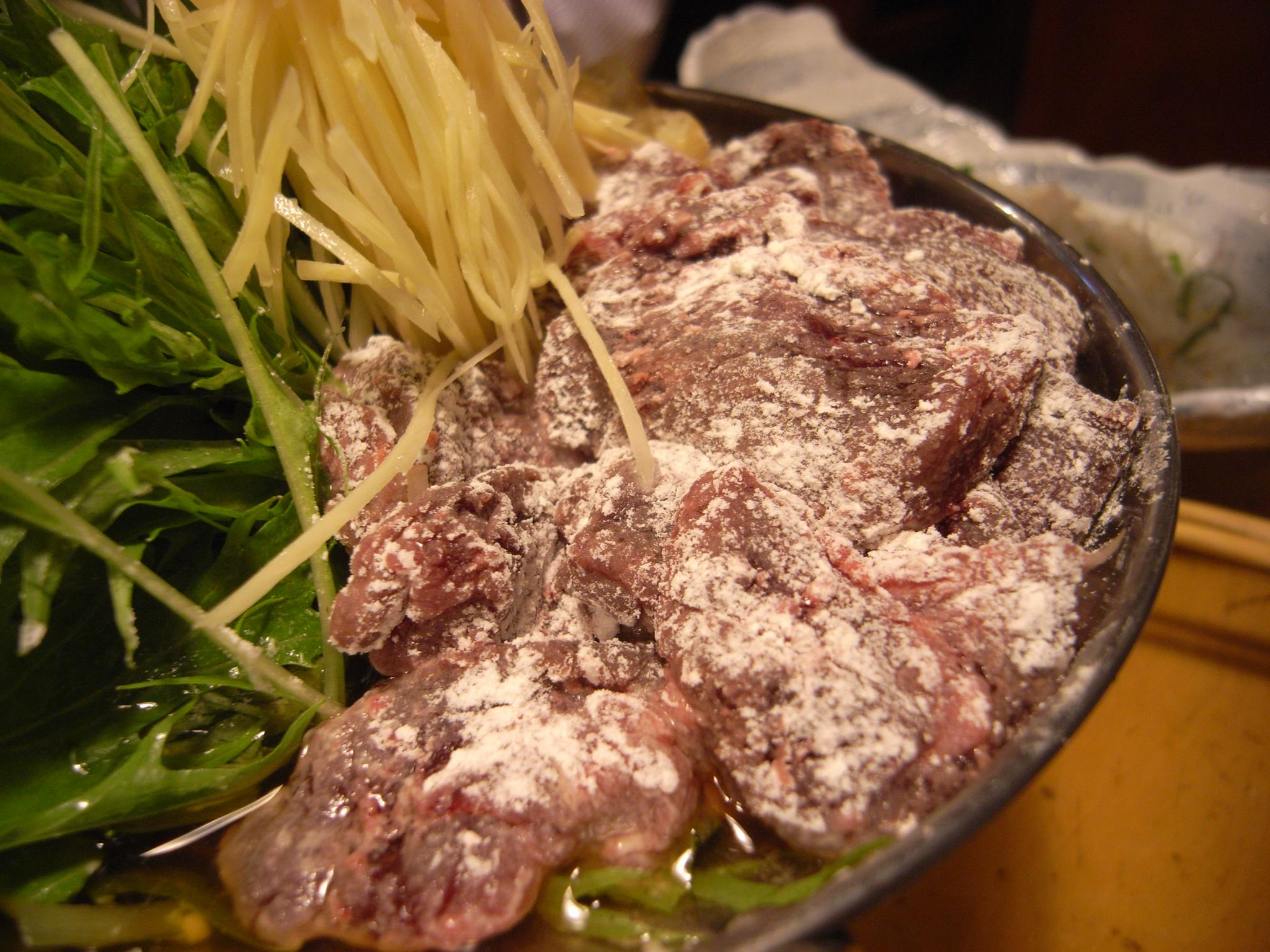
- Type: Soup
- Place of origin: Japan
- Region or state: Kansai
- Main ingredients: Minke whale meat (irigara), mizuna

Hari-hari nabe (はりはり鍋) is a type of nabemono made with minke whale meat and mizuna. It is mainly found in the Kansai region, mostly in the Osaka metropolitan area. The name "harihari" is onomatopoeic and refers to the sound of chewing mizuna.

The dish is most often made with fat meat, called irigara (炒り殻).

When whaling was popular in Japan, whale meat was cheap and easy to get, and the dish was eaten by the masses. Once commercial whaling ended, whale meat became more difficult to obtain, so pork or duck were frequently substituted in for whale.

== Variations ==
There are variations of hari-hari nabe based on region and ingredient availability. If aburaage is used in place of whale meat, it is called kitsune nabe (キツネ鍋). Some restaurants use horse meat in place of whale. Other variations include the addition of mushrooms or tofu.

== See also ==
- Nabemono
- Japanese cuisine
- List of Japanese soups and stews
