= Motsunabe =

Japanese hot pot dish

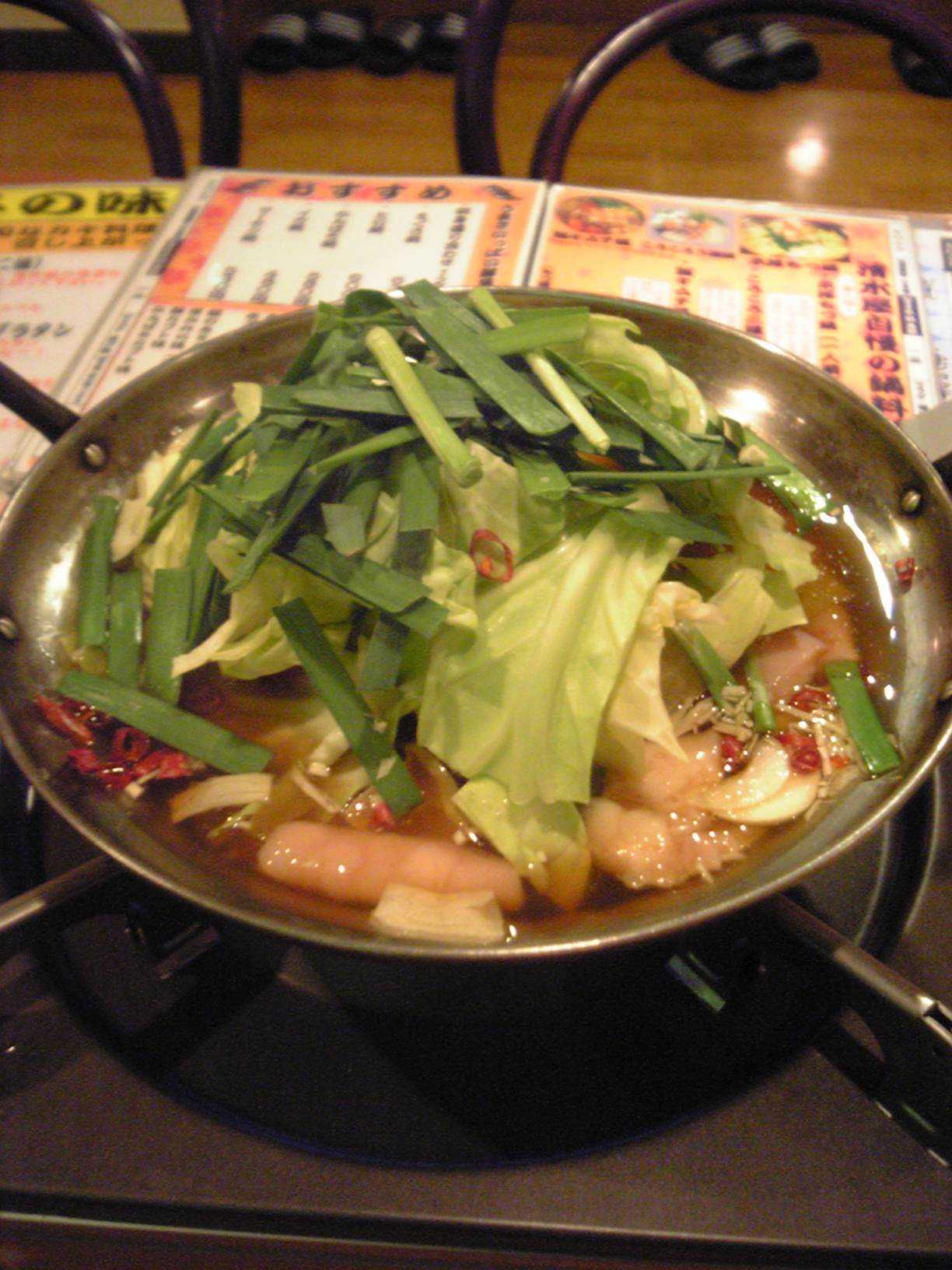
- Alternative names: Horumon-nabe
- Type: Soup
- Place of origin: Fukuoka, Japan
- Main ingredients: Miso, or soy sauce and garlic and chili pepper; beef or pork offal, champon

Motsunabe (もつ鍋) is a type of nabemono (hot pot dish) in Japanese cuisine, which is made from offal of various animals, including chicken giblets. It is a stew, prepared in a conventional kitchen pot or a special Japanese nabe pot (nabe). When it is cooked, it is filled with soup, prepared beef or pork offal and boiled; cabbage and garlic chives are added. The base soup is usually soy sauce with garlic and chili pepper, or miso. Champon noodles are often put into the pot and boiled to complete the dish. The offal used in motsunabe is mostly beef intestines, but various kinds of offal can be used.

Originally, motsunabe was a Fukuoka dish, but some restaurants advanced into Tokyo in the 1990s, and it was made a boom by the mass media and became known nationwide. Later, with BSE reaching Japan and the boom turning into a fad, motsunabe restaurants have not been very popular in Kantō and Tokyo. In the Kansai area horumonyaki is very popular, which is similar to motsunabe in that it is a local cuisine made from beef or pork offal. In Fukuoka, motsunabe remains popular, as it is not so expensive. It is often consumed with alcohol.

== Gallery ==
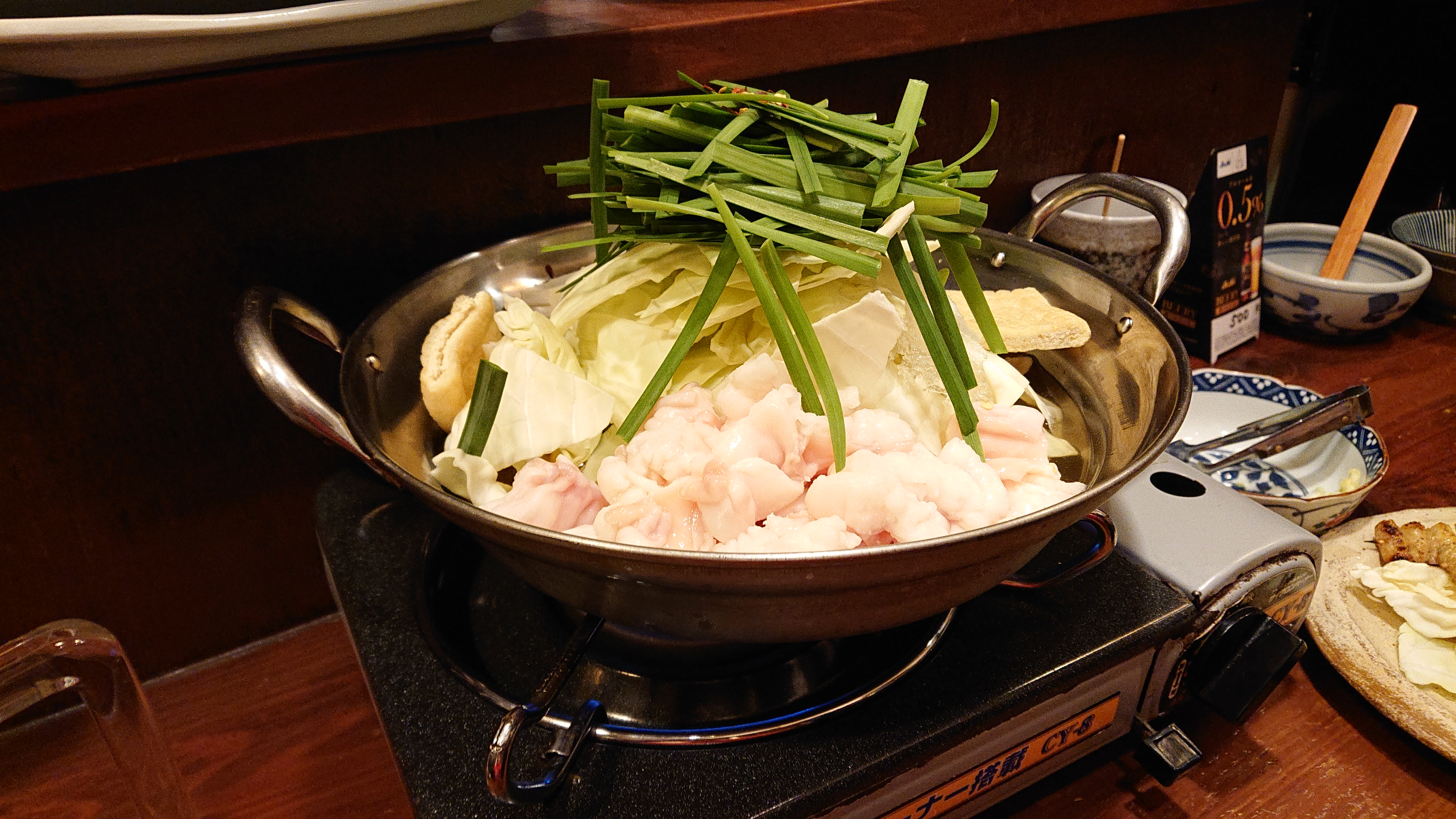

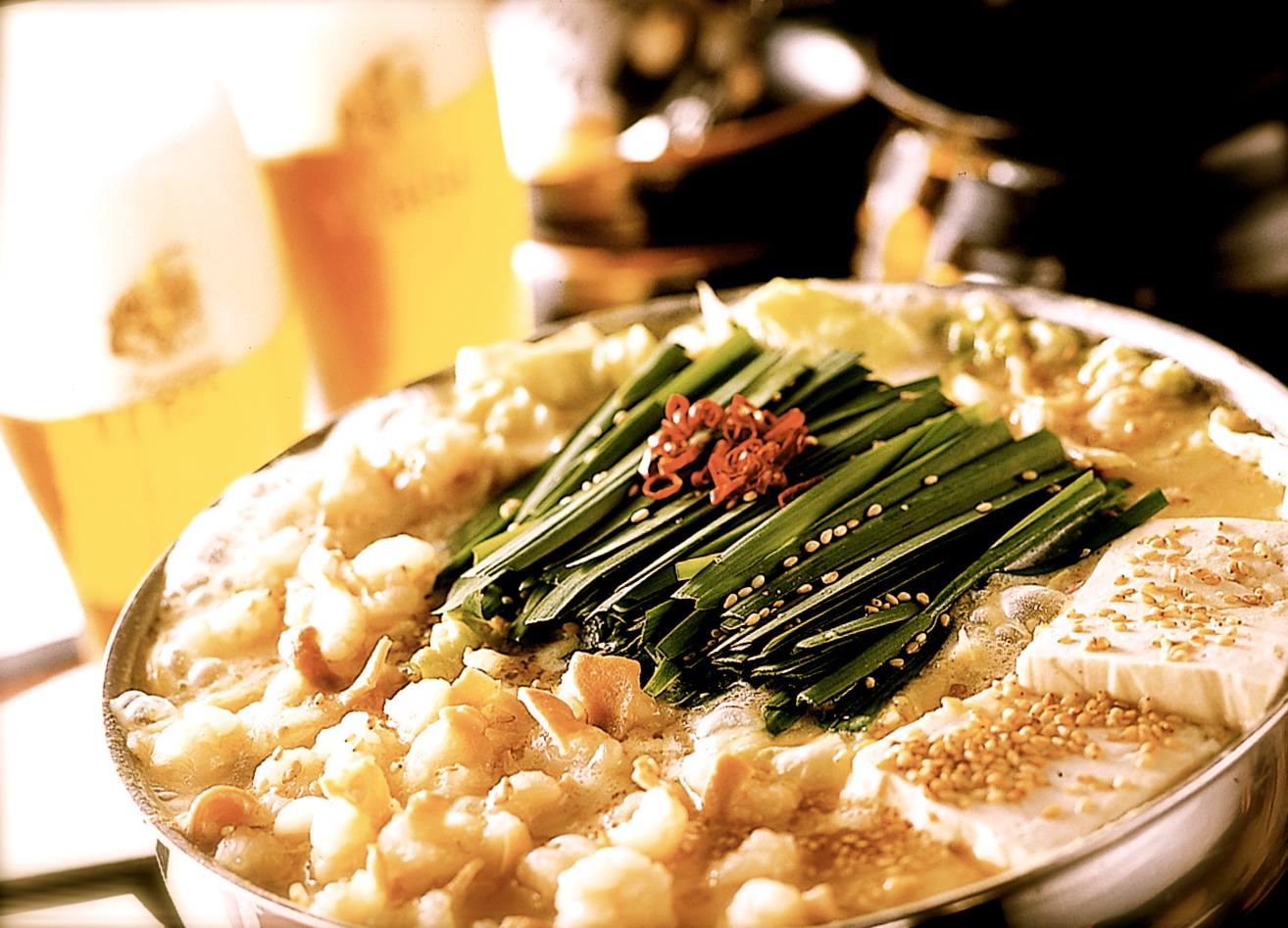

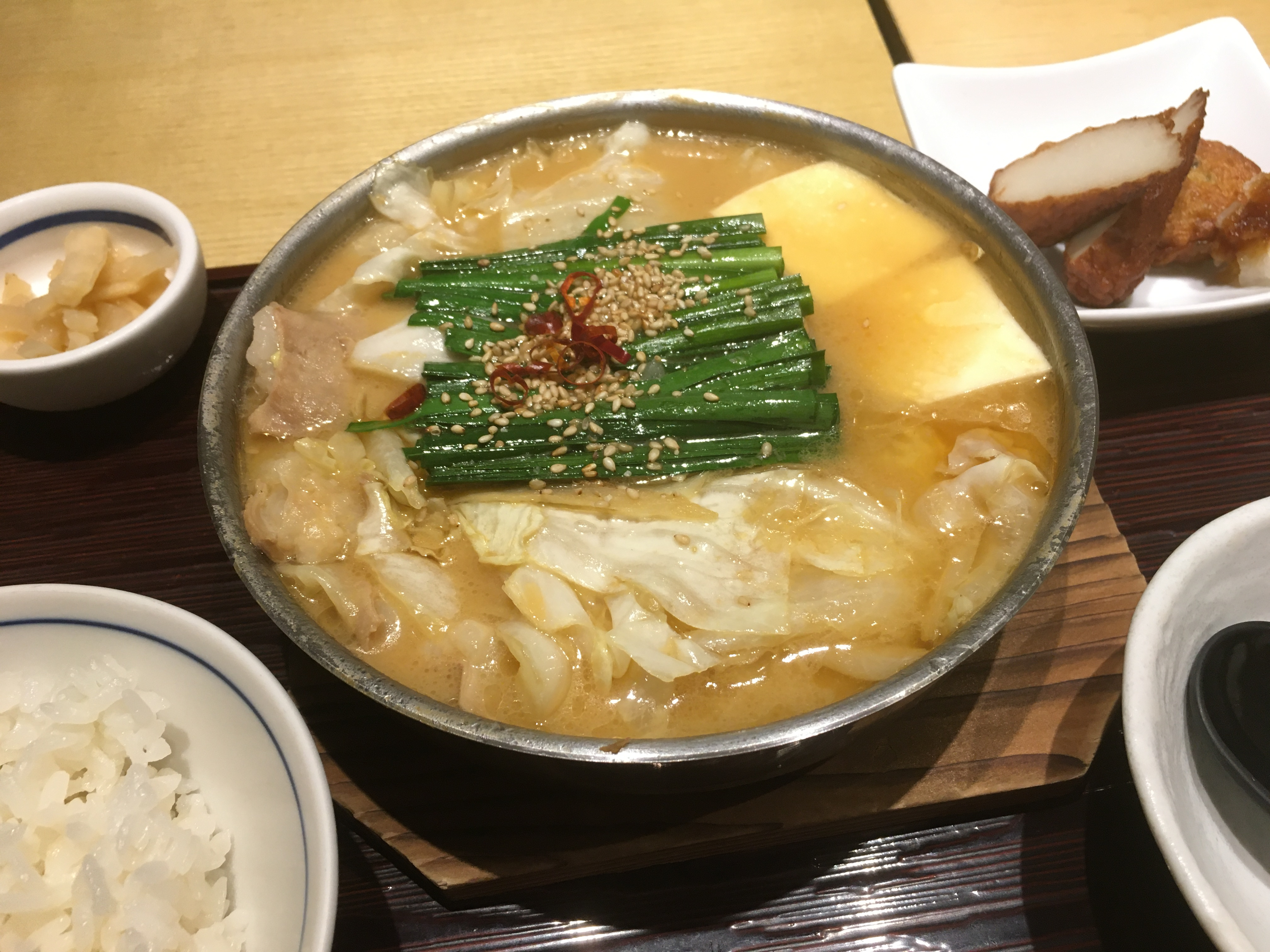

== See also ==
- List of Japanese soups and stews
