= Noppe =

Japanese soup

- Alternative names: Noppe-jiru
- Type: Stew
- Place of origin: Japan
- Main ingredients: Vegetables, sesame oil

Noppe (のっぺい, noppei; also 濃餅 or 能平) is a traditional stew served throughout Japan. It has many different names depending on the region, but its most famous version is from Niigata, known as either Noppe, Noppei, or Noppe-jiru.

Noppe is generally made from left-over vegetable parts, sauteed or boiled in sesame oil. The ingredients and thickening agents vary widely per town and region, but yams, carrots, radish, taro, shiitake mushrooms, konjac, and fried tofu are often used. After the ingredients are boiled into a stew, thickening agents such as soy sauce, salt and starch are added. Chicken or fish are also occasionally used.

In and around Niigata, it is often eaten at festivals, Buddhist ceremonies, and during the New Year period.

== See also ==
- List of Japanese soups and stews
