= Fugu chiri =

Japanese pufferfish soup

- Fugu-nabe
- Alternative names: Tetchiri
- Type: Soup
- Place of origin: Japan
- Main ingredients: Pufferfish

Fugu chiri is a pufferfish soup. It is also known as tetchiri.

== See also ==
- Fugu
- List of Japanese soups and stews
