= Kiritanpo =

Japanese skewered rice dish

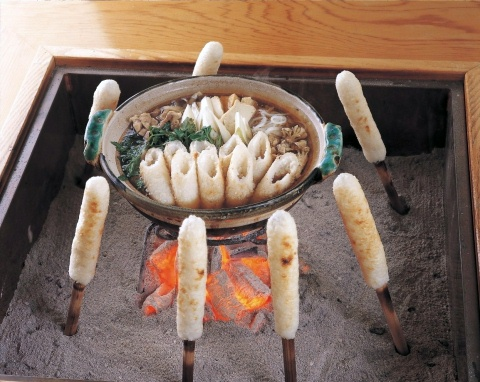
- Type: Soup
- Place of origin: Japan
- Region or state: Ōdate, Akita Prefecture
- Main ingredients: Rice, sweet miso

Kiritanpo (きりたんぽ) is a Japanese dish particularly in Akita Prefecture. Freshly cooked rice is pounded until somewhat mashed, then formed into cylinders around Japanese cedar skewers, and toasted over an open hearth. It can then be served with sweet miso or cooked as dumplings with meat and vegetables in soups.

== See also ==
- Chikuwa
- List of Japanese soups and stews
