= List of Japanese soups and stews =

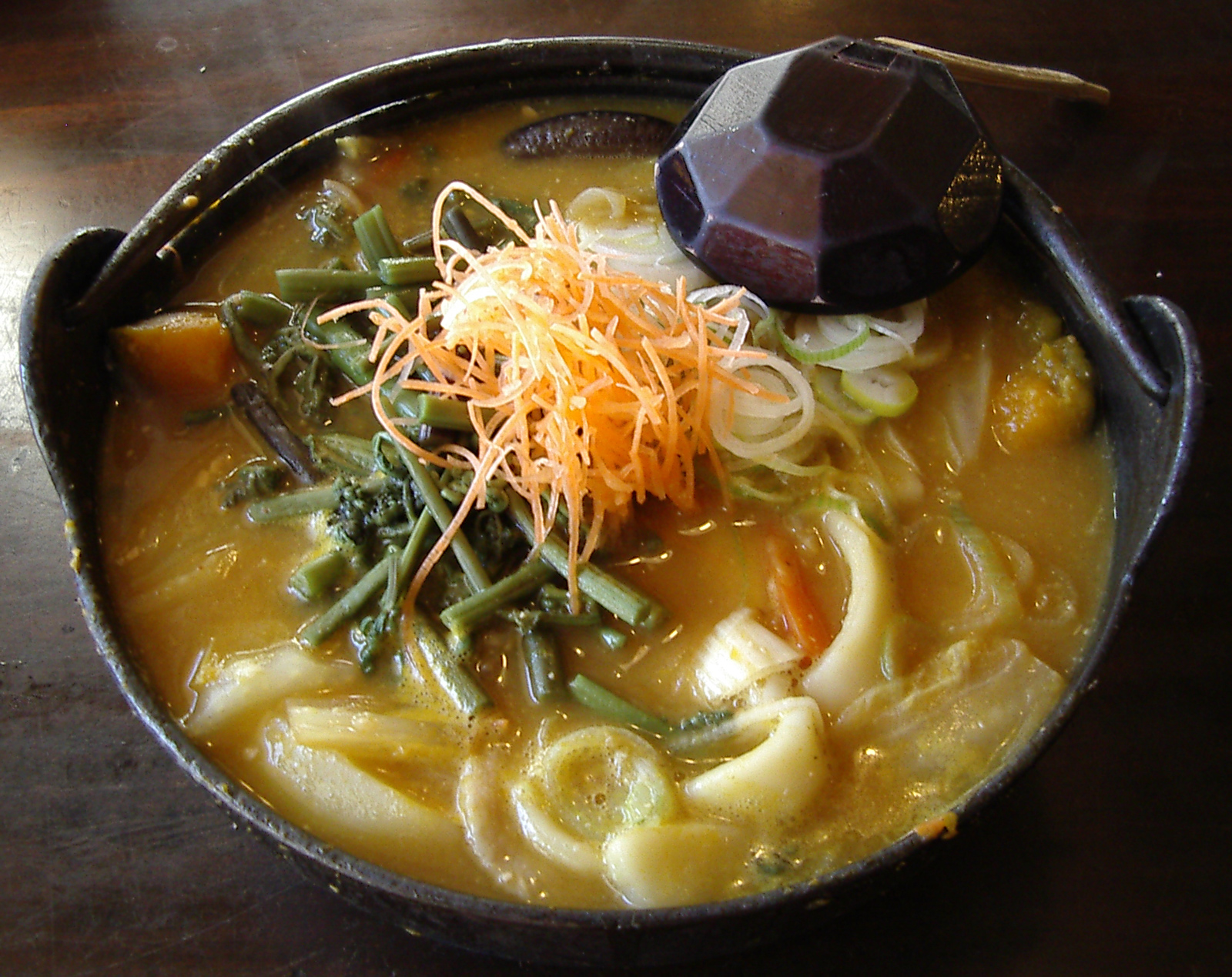
Hōtō (ほうとう) is a popular regional dish originating from Yamanashi, Japan made by stewing flat udon noodles and vegetables in miso soup.

In Japanese cuisine, the phrase ichijū-sansai (一汁三菜, "one soup, three sides") refers to the makeup of a typical meal served, but has roots in classic kaiseki, honzen, and yūsoku cuisine. The term is also used to describe the first course served in standard kaiseki cuisine nowadays.

== Japanese soups and stews ==
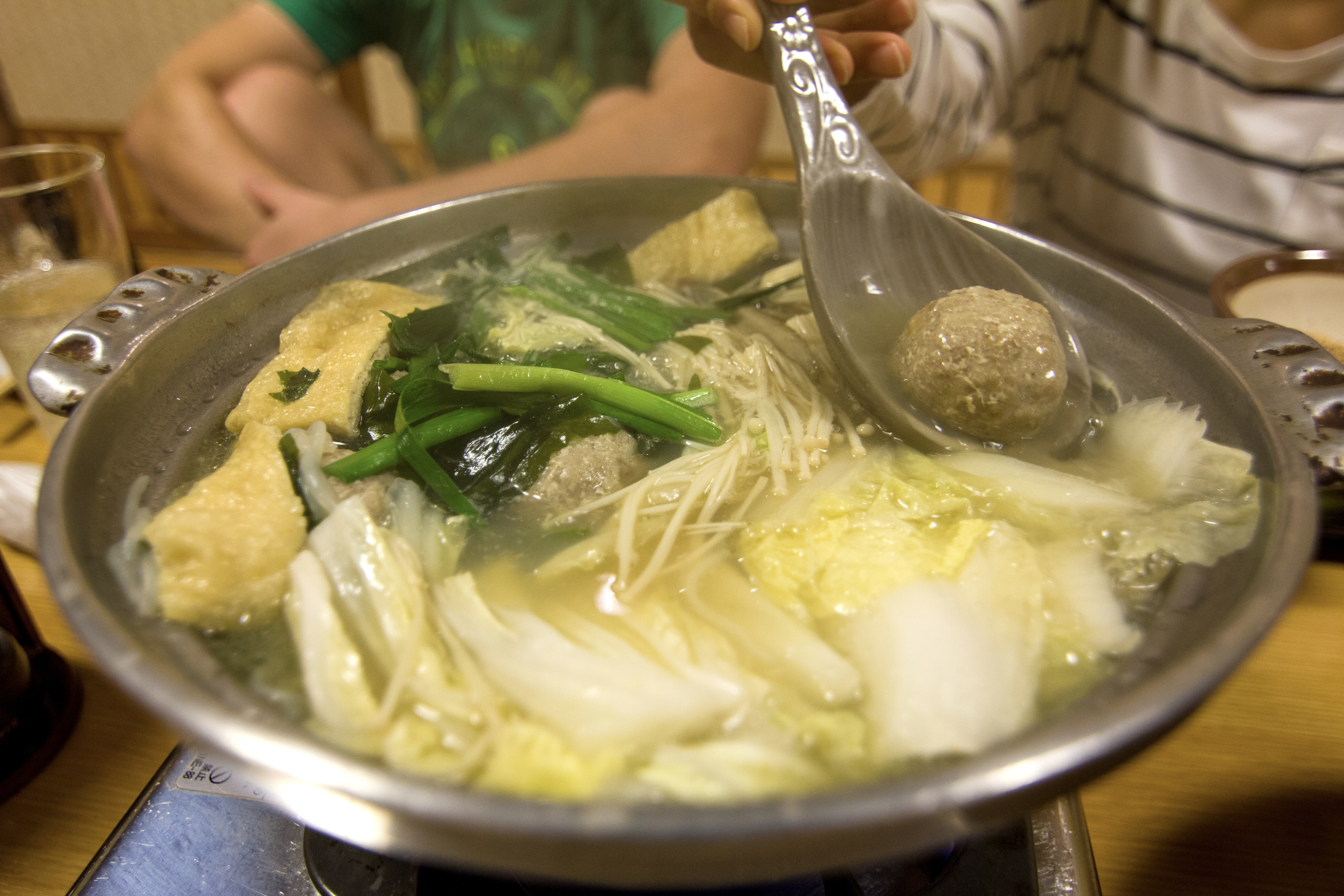
Chankonabe

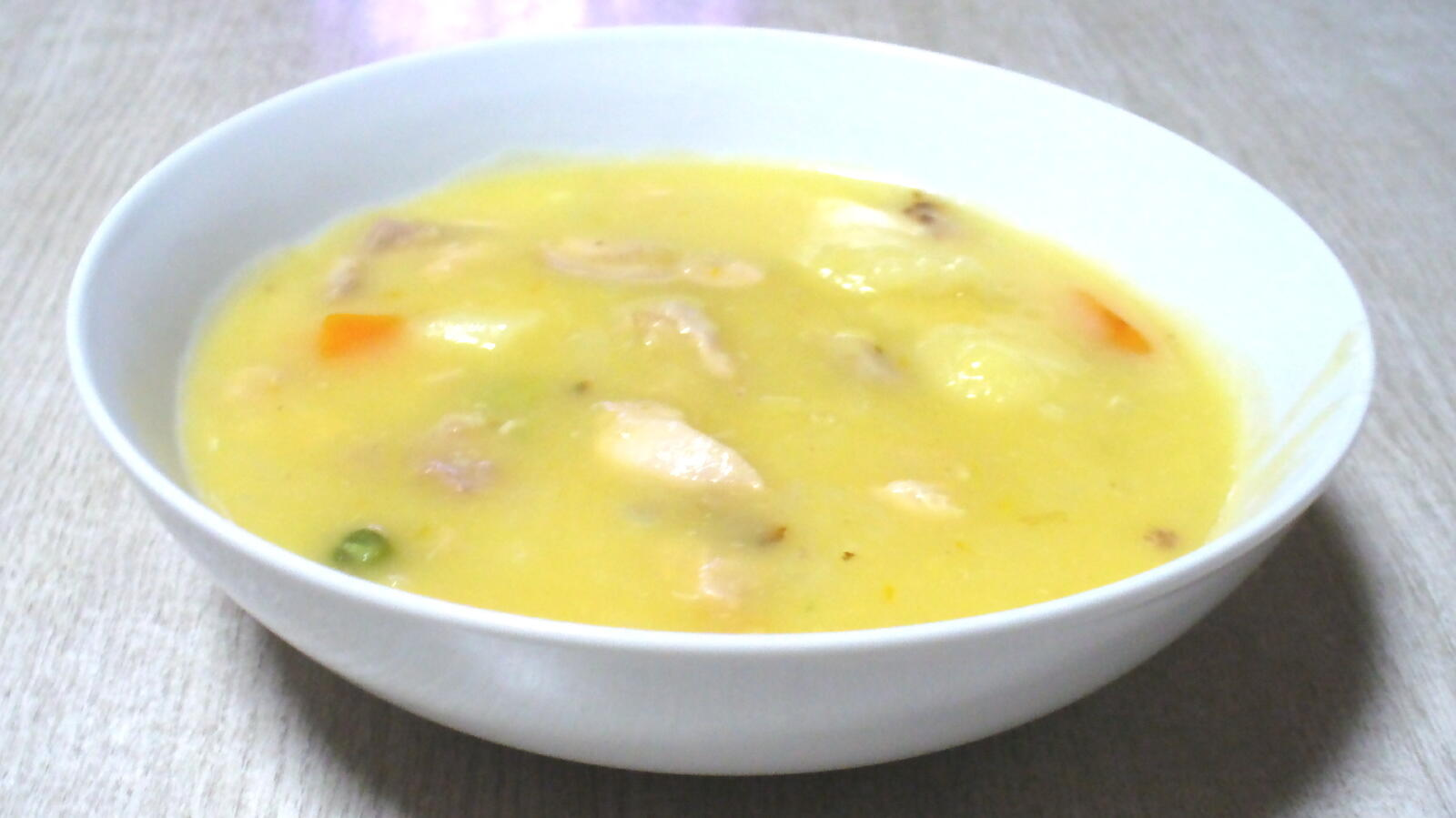
Cream stew

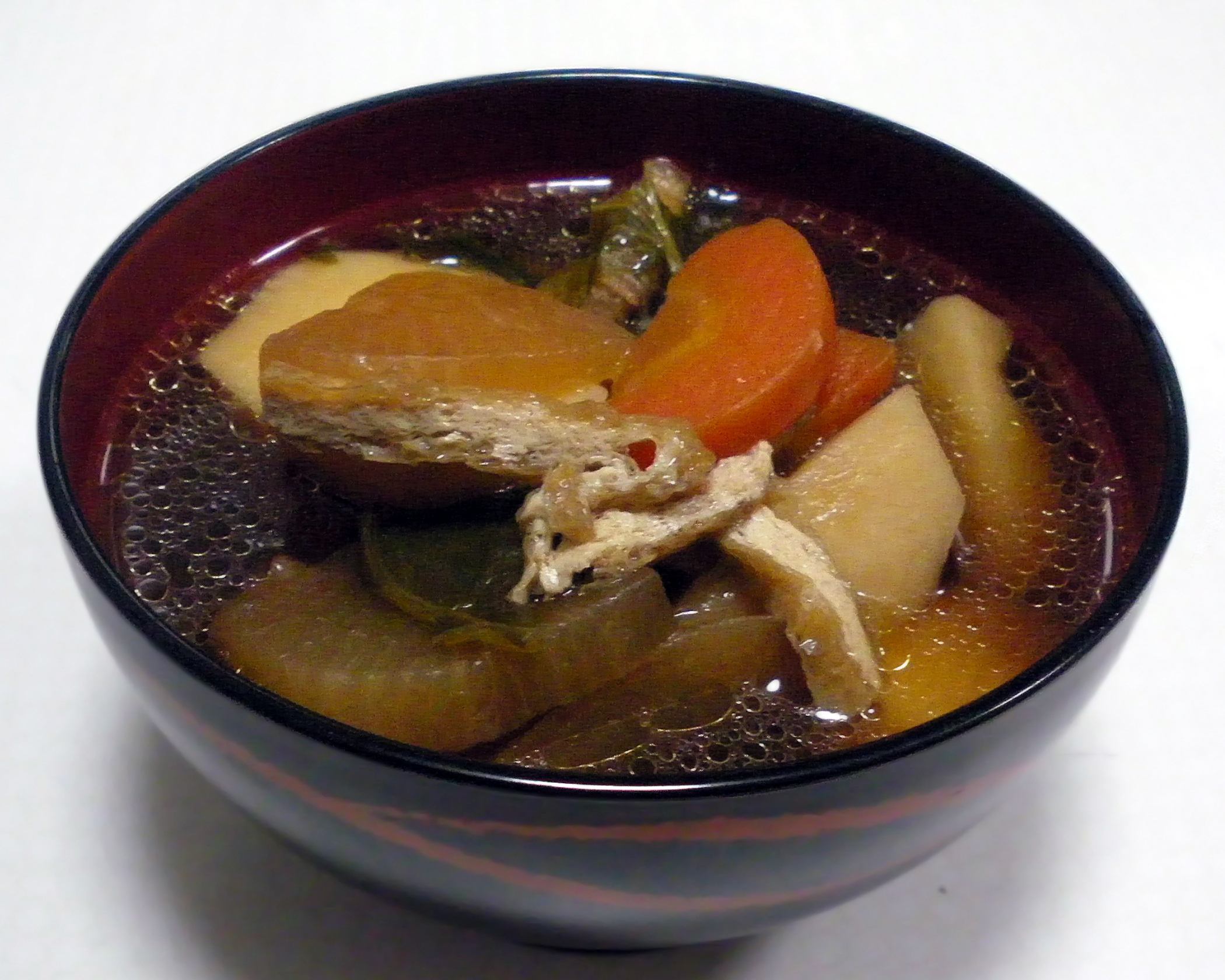
Kenchin jiru

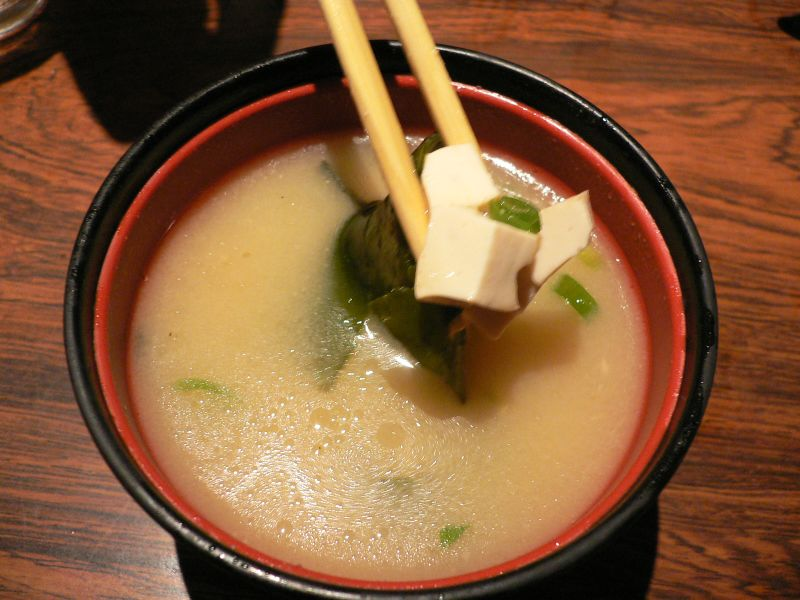
Miso soup with tofu

=== Soup/Shirumono ===
- Butajiru – also known as tonjiru, soup made with pork and vegetables, flavoured with miso
- Dashi – a class of soup and cooking stock used in Japanese cuisine
- Sweet corn porridge soup
- Kasujiru
- Kenchin jiru
- Miso soup
- Noppe
- Ohaw
- Suimono – generic name for clear traditional soups
  - Ushiojiru – clear soup of clams
- Torijiru – Chicken soup
- Zenzai – In Okinawa Prefecture, refers to red bean soup served over shaved ice with mochi
- Zōni

=== Noodle soup ===
- Champon – noodle dish that is a regional cuisine of Nagasaki
- Hōtō – regional Yamanashi dish made by stewing flat udon noodles and vegetables in miso soup
- Instant noodles
  - Cup noodles
- Okinawa soba
- Ramen
  - Tonkotsu ramen
- Udon – many variations, including kitsune udon topped with aburaage (sweetened deep-fried tofu pockets)

=== Stew/nimono ===
- Cream stew – yōshoku dish consisting of meat and mixed vegetables cooked in thick white roux.
- Nikujaga
- Zosui

=== Hot pot/Nabemono ===
- Chankonabe – stew commonly eaten by sumo wrestlers as part of a weight-gain diet
- Dojō nabe – loach, tokusanhin of Asakusa in Tokyo
- Fugu chiri – pufferfish
- Harihari-nabe – minke whale meat and mizuna
- Imoni – beef and potatoes
- Kiritanpo
- Motsunabe
- Oden
- Shabu-shabu
- Sukiyaki
Japanese soups and stews

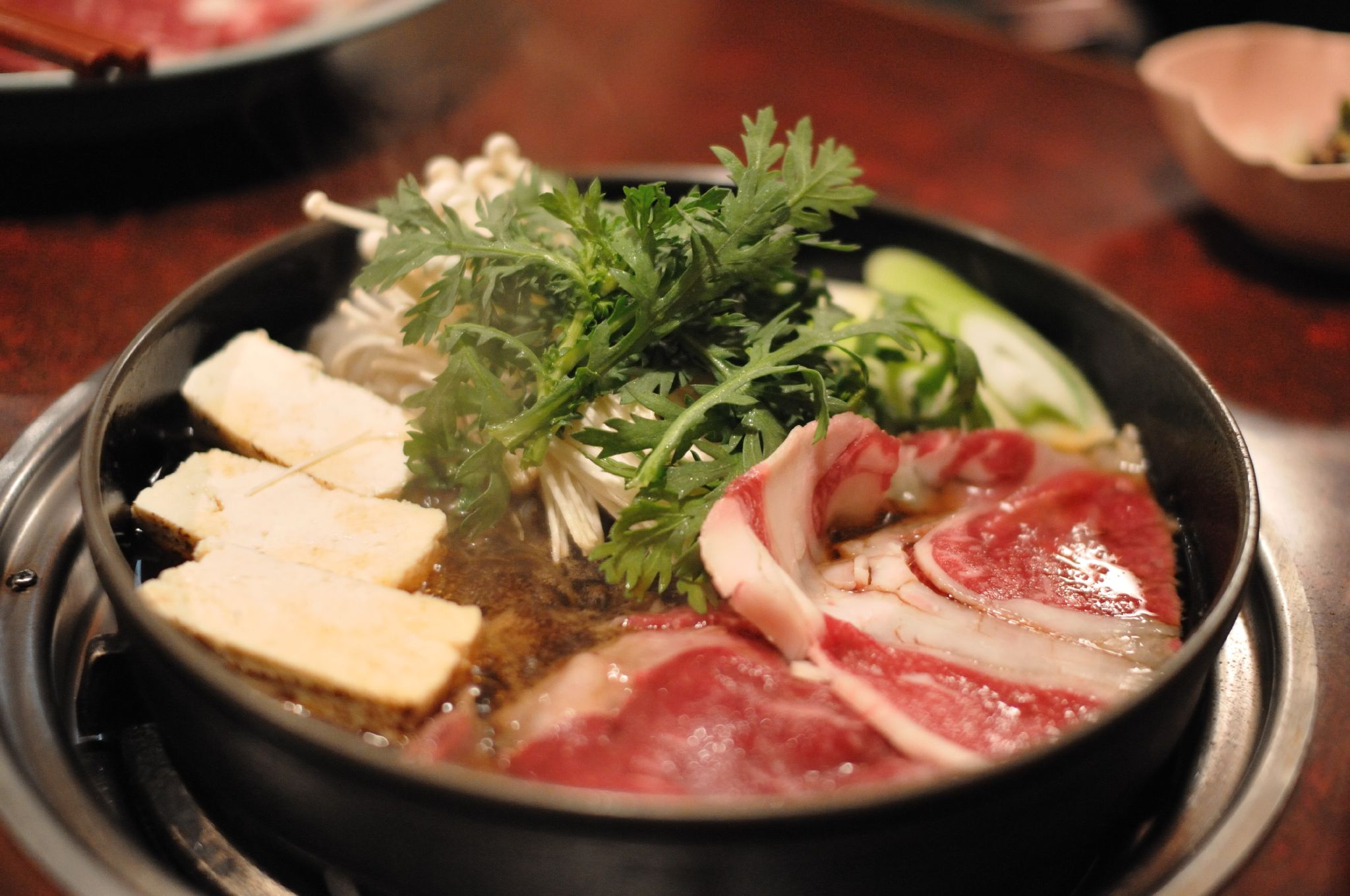
Sukiyaki

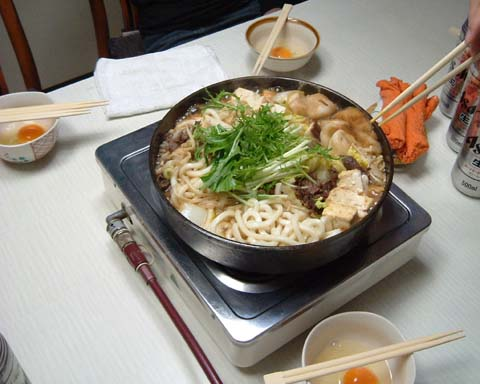
Nabemono

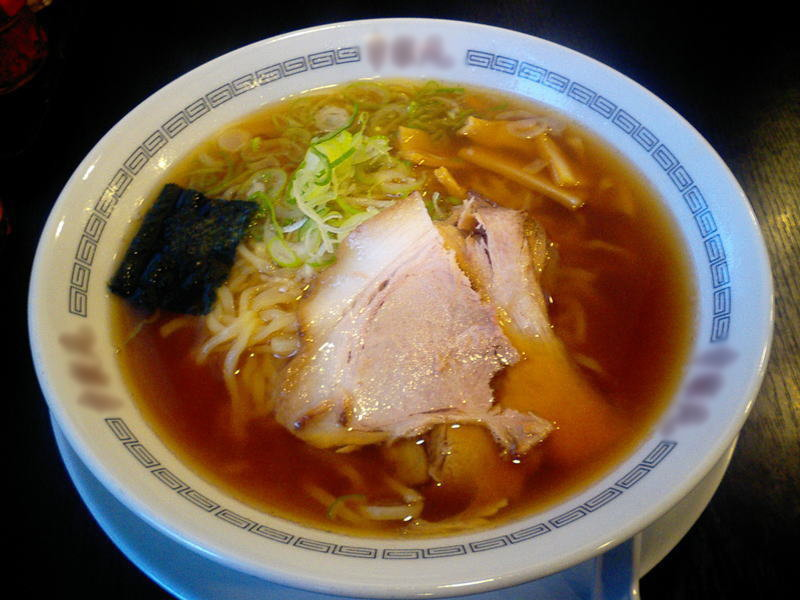
Ramen

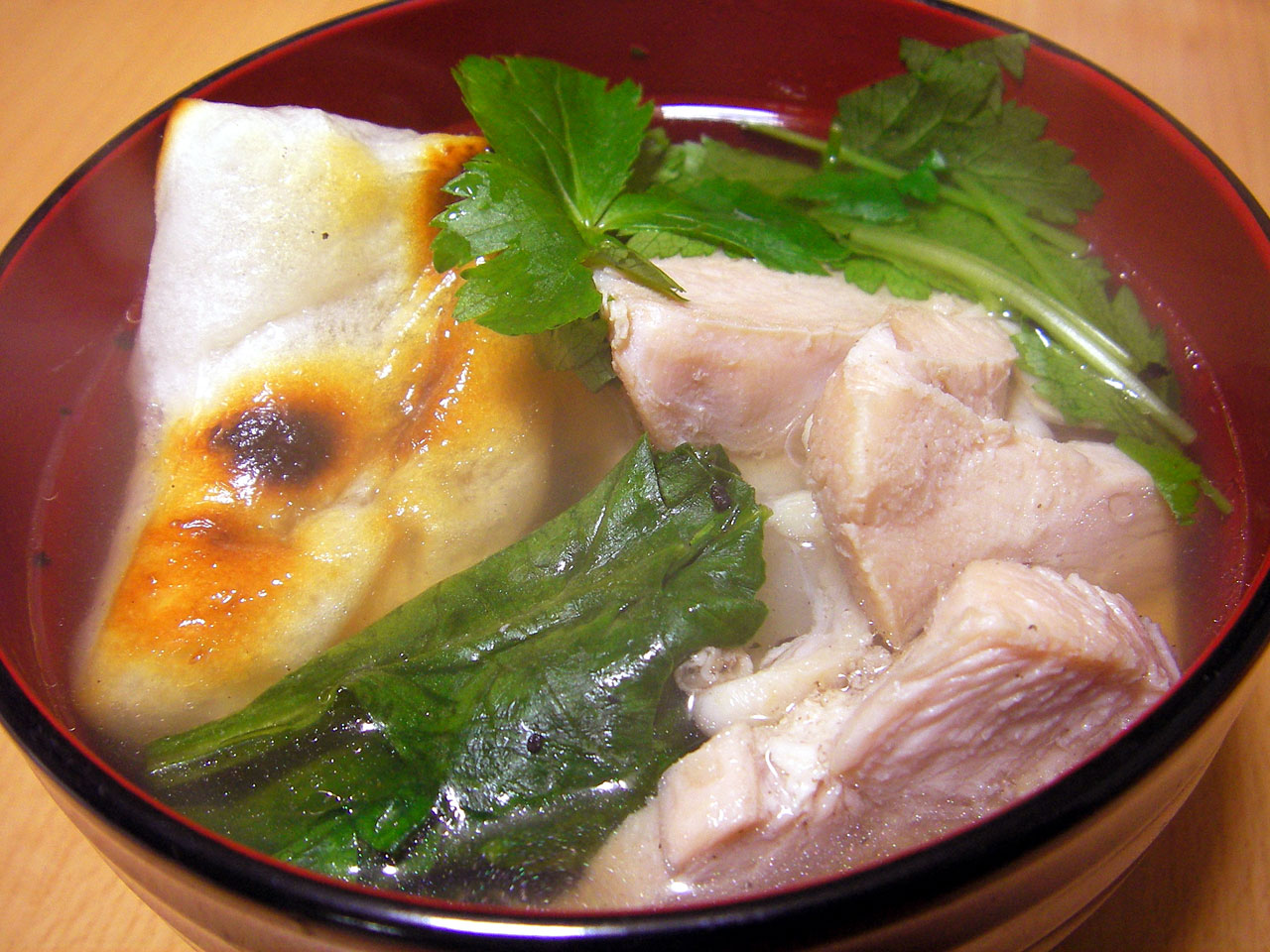
Zōni

== See also ==
- Aonori – edible green seaweed used in Japanese soups and other dishes
- Asian soup
- Japanese noodles
- List of Japanese condiments
- List of Japanese dishes
- List of Japanese desserts and sweets
- List of Japanese ingredients
- List of ramen dishes
- List of soups
- List of stews
- Tsukemen
