= Shippoku =

Japanese culinary style

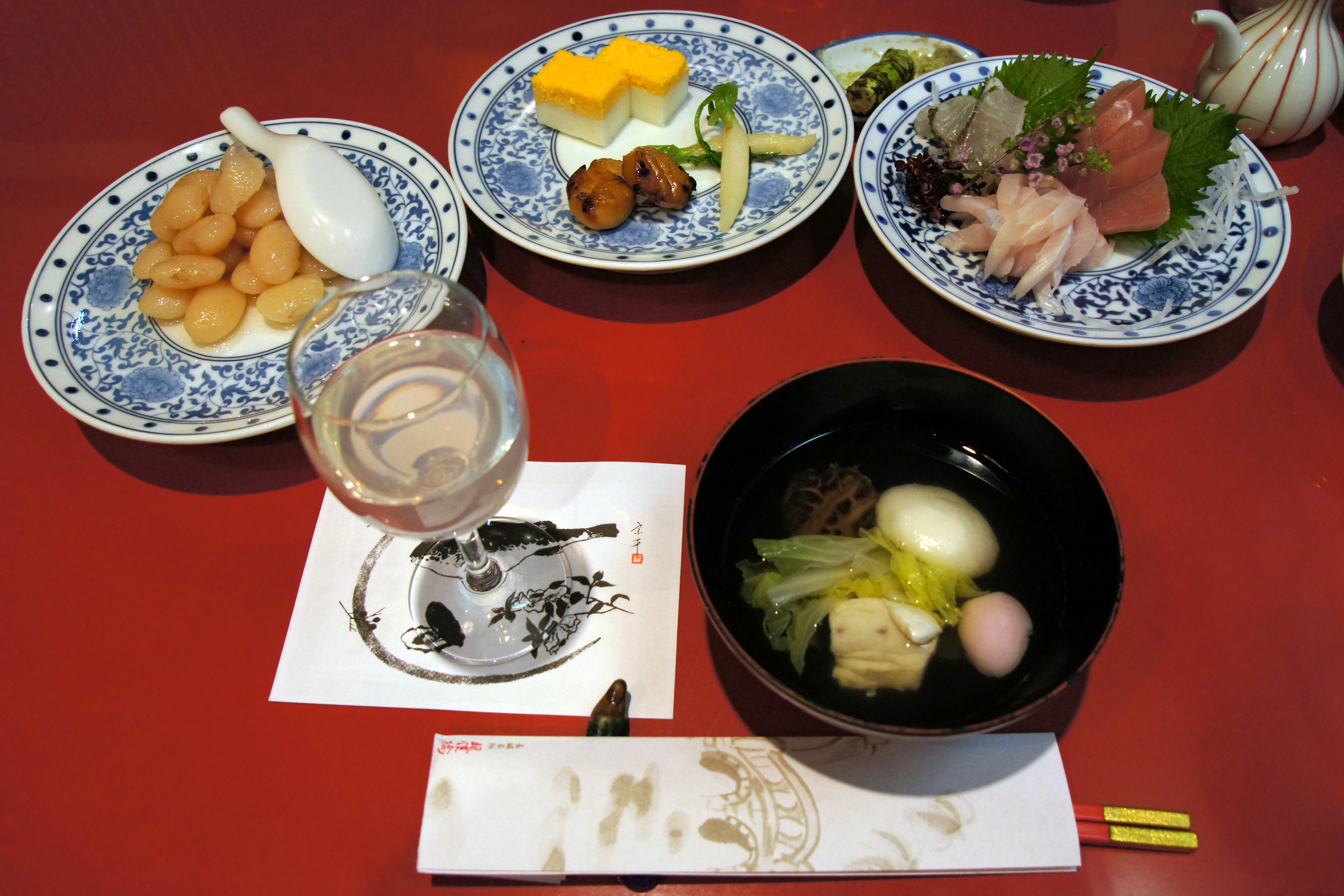
Various shippoku dishes at a restaurant in Nagasaki, Japan

Shippoku (卓袱) is a Japanese culinary style that is heavily influenced by Chinese cuisine. It has been described as a fusion cuisine and as a "hybrid cuisine" that combines elements of European, Chinese and Japanese cuisines. Meats used in shippoku cuisine include fowl, fish, and game meats. Sake typically accompanies shippoku dishes. The shippoku style of service typically includes several small dishes that comprise a full meal.

== Etymology ==
"Shippoku" is a Japanese word that means "table cloth." (Note: "The word "Shippoku" means table cloth.")

== History ==
Shippoku cuisine originated from Chinese immigrants to Nagasaki, Japan during the Edo period, which occurred from 1603 to 1868. Nagasaki was the only place in Japan where foreigners (Portuguese, Dutch and Chinese) were allowed to reside during the "centuries of seclusion." During the eighteenth century in Japan, the popularity of Chinese cuisine increased among Japanese intellectuals, and restaurants that focused upon shippoku and fucha cuisines, a vegetarian cuisine also influenced by Chinese cuisine, emerged.

Shippoku cuisine remains a specialty of Nagasaki.

== See also ==
- List of Japanese dishes
