= Nabemono =

Variety of Japanese hot pot dishes

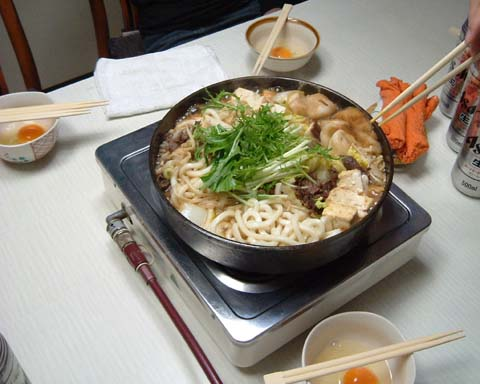
- Sukiyaki in udonsuki-style and raw eggs in bowls
- Type: Hot pot dishes
- Place of origin: Japan
- Region or state: East Asia
- Similar dishes: Jeongol

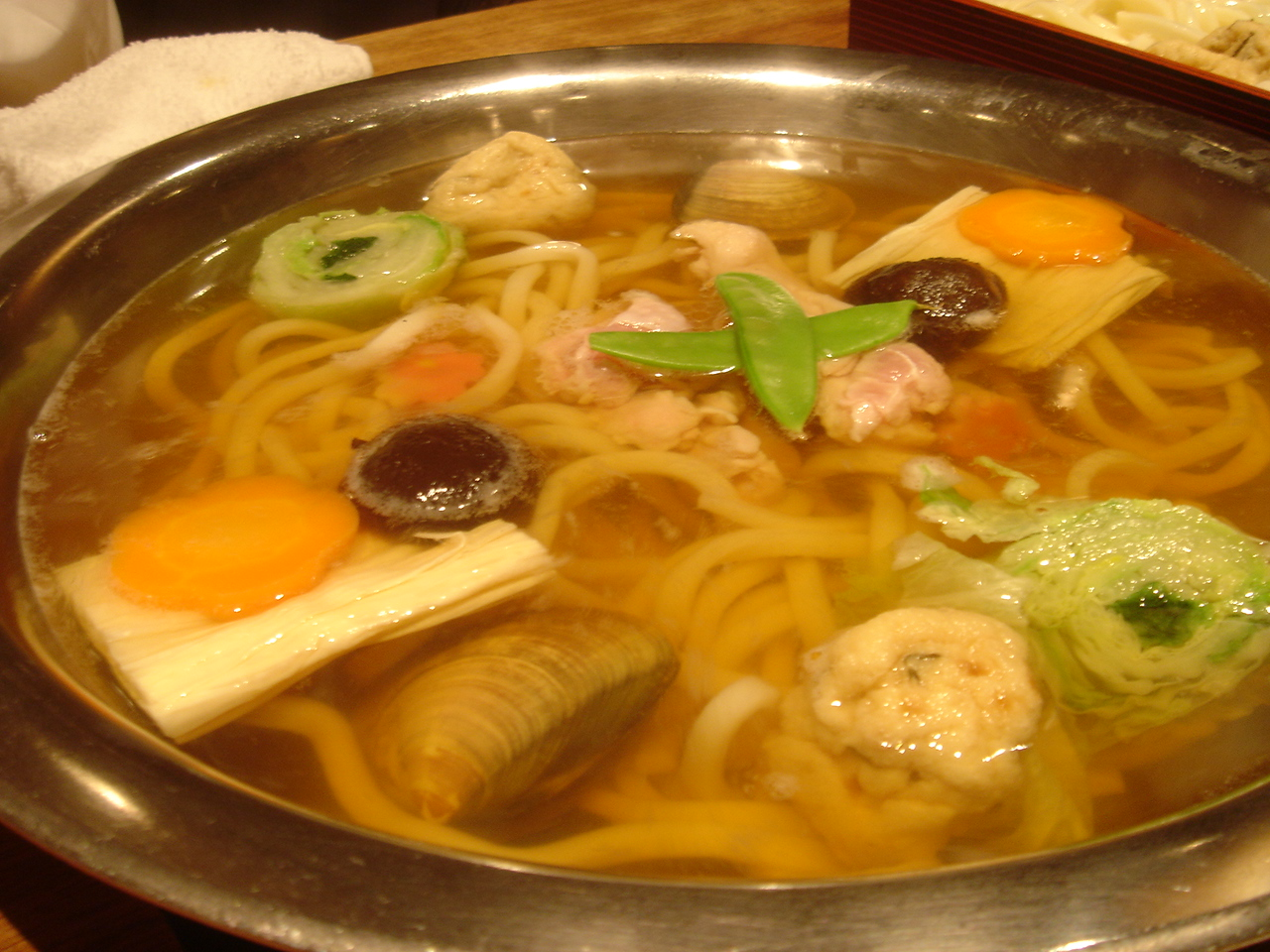
Udon suki

Nabemono (鍋物, なべ物, nabe "cooking pot" + mono "thing"), or simply nabe, is a variety of Japanese hot pot dishes, also known as one-pot dishes and sometimes translated as "things in a pot".

== Description ==
Nabemono are stews and soups containing many types of ingredients that are served while still boiling. Nabe is thus typically enjoyed on cold days or in the winter. In modern Japan, nabemono are kept hot at the dining table by portable stoves. The dish is frequently cooked at the table, and the diners can pick the cooked ingredients they want from the pot. It is either eaten with the broth or with a dip. Further ingredients can also be successively added to the pot.

There are two types of nabemono in Japan: lightly flavored stock (mostly with kombu) types such as yudōfu (湯豆腐) and mizutaki (水炊き), eaten with a dipping sauce (tare) to enjoy the taste of the ingredients themselves; and strongly flavored stock, typically with miso, soy sauce, dashi, and/or sweet soy types such as yosenabe (寄鍋), oden (おでん), and sukiyaki (すき焼き), eaten without further flavoring.

The pots are traditionally made of clay (土鍋, donabe) or thick cast iron (鉄鍋, tetsunabe). Clay pots can keep warm for a while after being taken off the fire, while cast iron pots evenly distribute heat and are preferable for sukiyaki. Pots are usually placed in the center of dining tables and are shared by a group of people. This is considered the most sociable way to eat with friends and family.

== Varieties ==
- Chankonabe (ちゃんこ鍋): was originally served only to sumo wrestlers. Chankonabe is served with more ingredients than other nabemono, as it was developed to help sumo wrestlers gain weight. Many recipes exist but usually contain meatballs, chicken, vegetables such as napa cabbage and udon.
- Motsunabe (もつ鍋): made with beef or pork offal, originally a local cuisine of Fukuoka but popularised nationwide in the 1990s because of its taste and reasonable price. The ingredients of motsunabe vary from restaurant to restaurant, but it is typical to boil fresh cow offal with cabbage and garlic chives. After the offal and vegetables are eaten, the rest of soup is used to cook champon noodles. The soup bases are mainly soy sauce or miso.
- Oden: several ingredients such as boiled eggs, daikon, konjac, and processed fishcakes stewed in a light, soy-flavoured dashi broth. Karashi (Japanese mustard) is often used as a condiment.
- Shabu-shabu: thinly sliced meat and vegetables that are boiled in a pot at the dining table and eaten with a dipping sauce.
- Sukiyaki: thinly sliced beef, tofu, vegetables and starch noodles stewed in sweetened shouyu and eaten with a raw egg dip.
- Yosenabe: Yose (寄) means "putting together", implying that all things (e.g., meat, seafood, egg, tofu and vegetables) are cooked together in a pot. Yosenabe is typically based on a broth made with miso or soy sauce flavourings.
- Yudofu: tofu simmered in a kombu stock and served with ponzu and various condiments.
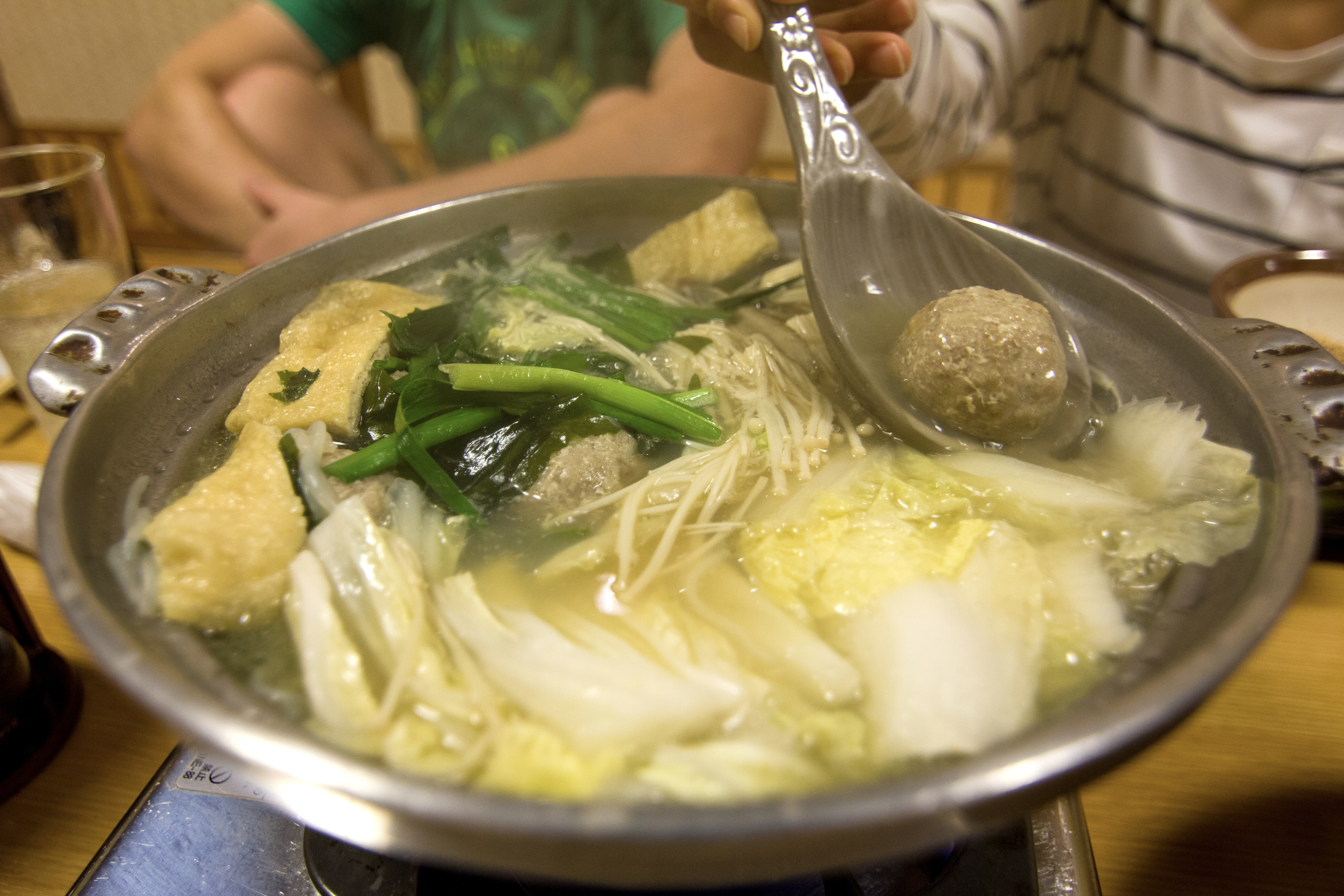
Chankonabe

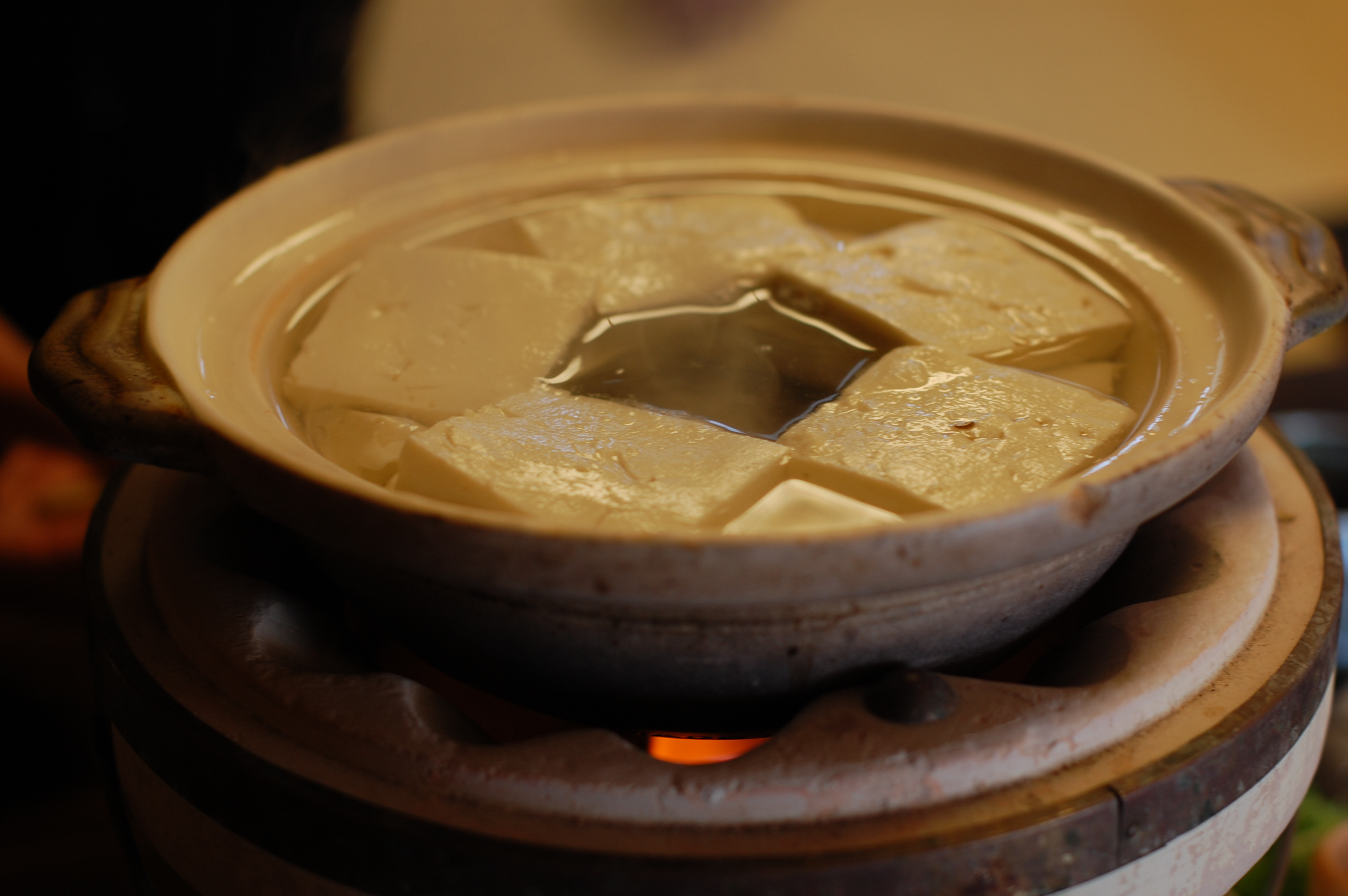
Yudofu

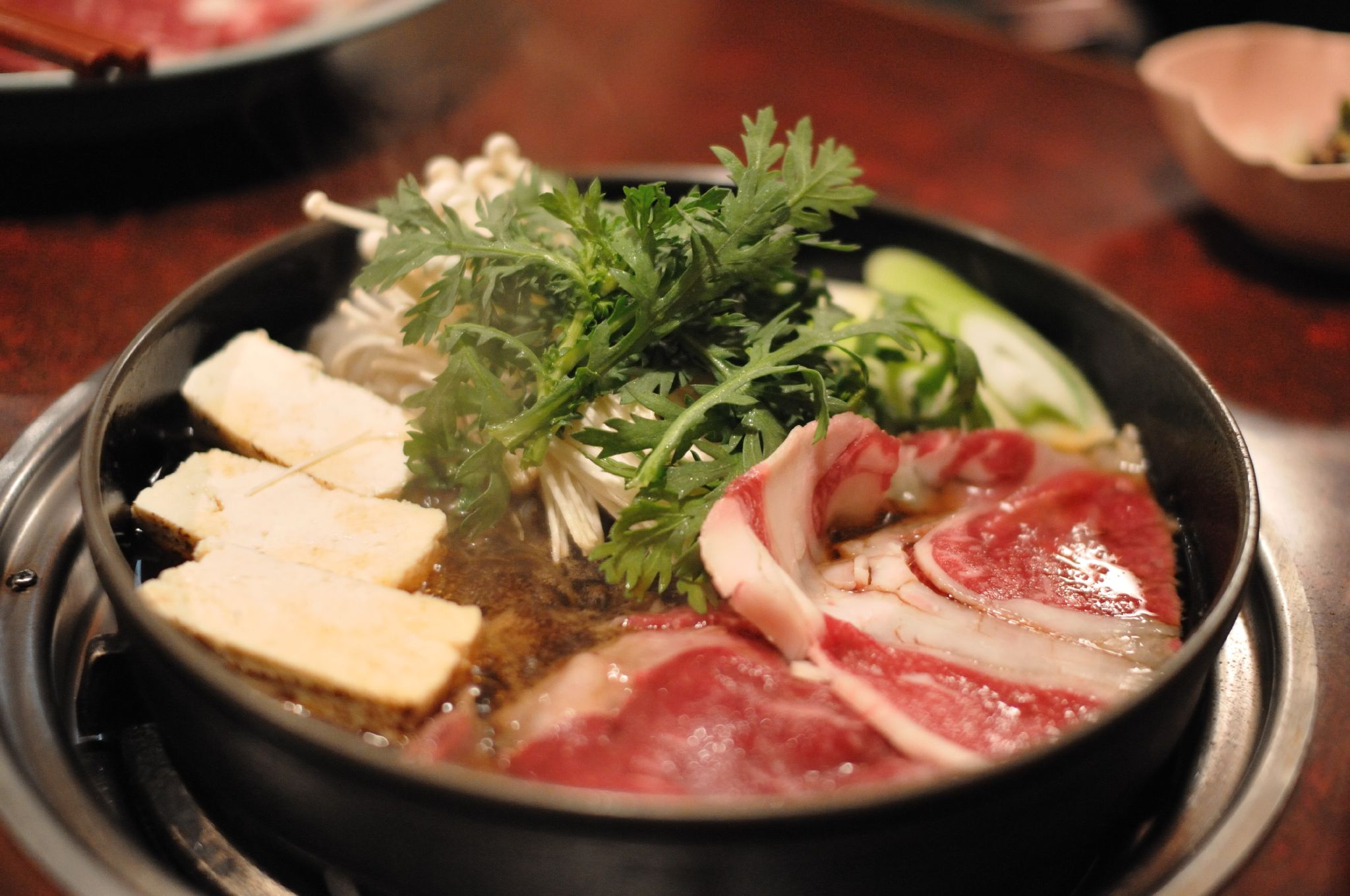
Sukiyaki

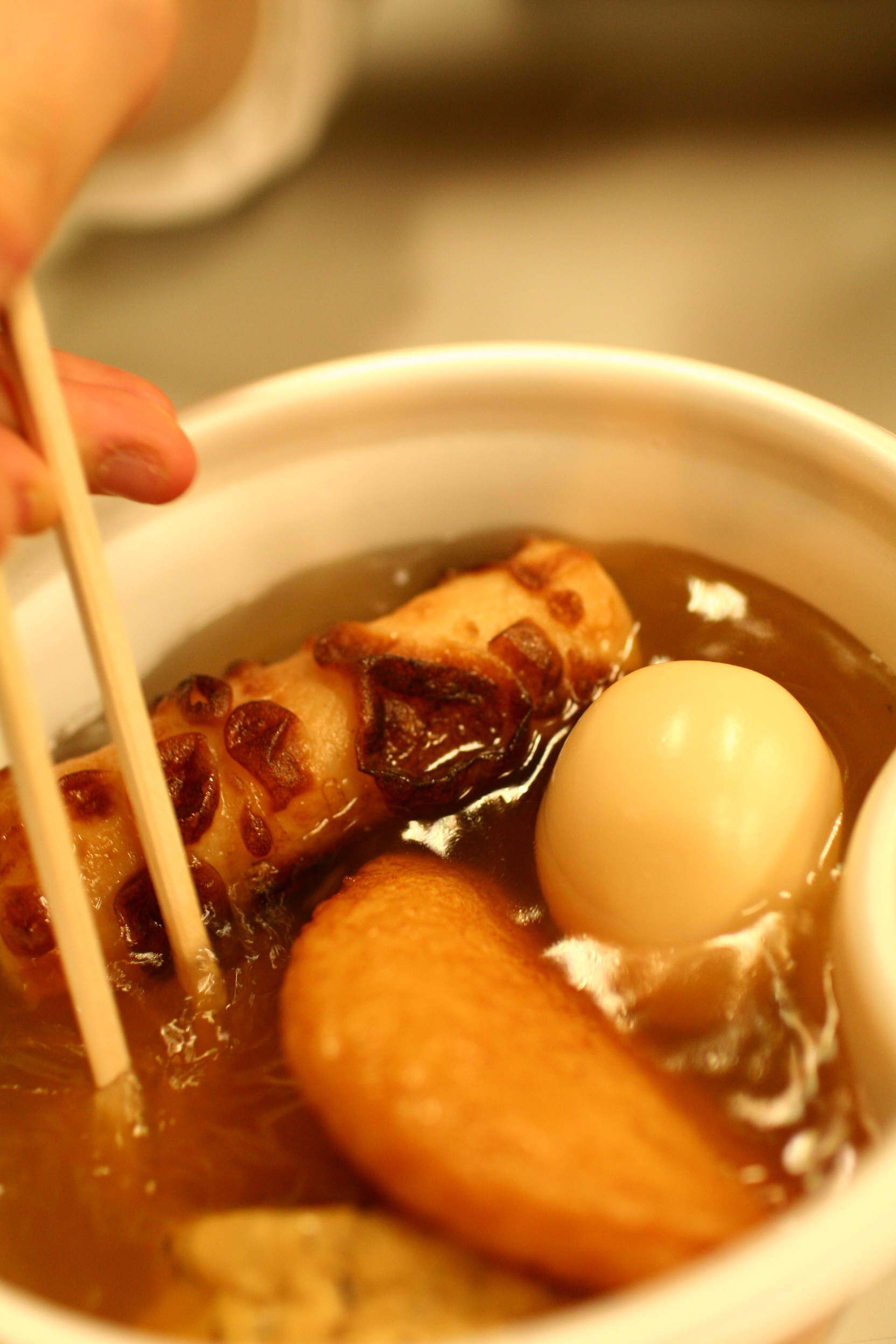
Oden

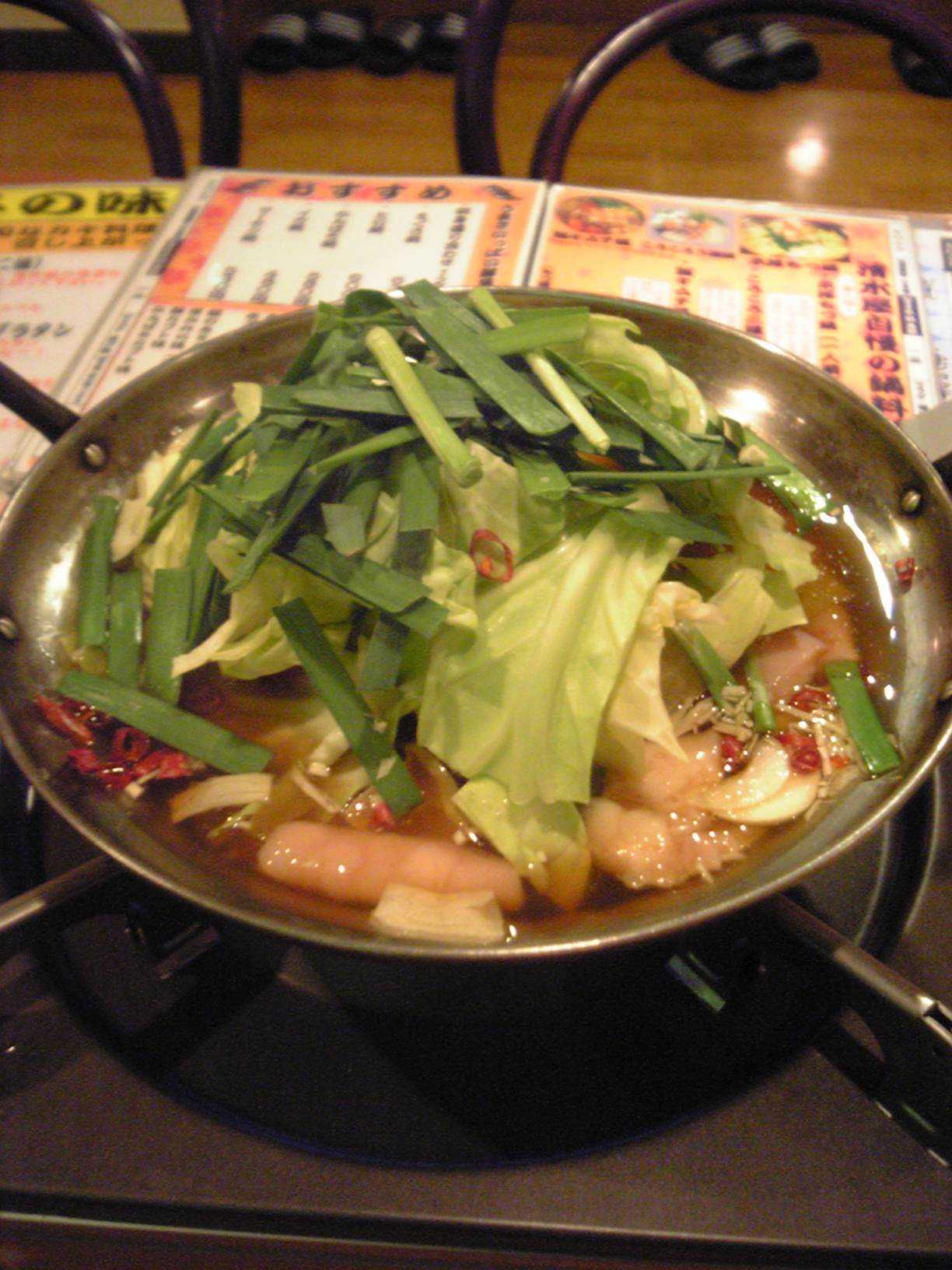
Motsunabe

=== Regional variations ===
Nabe being made at a dinner party in Japan

There are many regional nabemono in Japan, which contain regional specialty foods such as salmon in Hokkaido and oyster in Hiroshima. Examples include:

- Hokkaido
  - Ishikari-nabe: salmon stewed in a miso-based broth with vegetables. Typical ingredients include daikon, tofu, konjac, Chinese cabbage, potato, Welsh onion, shungiku, shiitake mushroom and butter.
- Tōhoku Region
  - Kiritampo-nabe: Kiritampo (pounded rice, skewered and grilled) stewed in broth with chicken, burdock, Japanese parsley, Welsh onion, and konjac. Specialty of Akita Prefecture.
- Kantō region
  - Hōtō-nabe: a specialty of Yamanashi. Hōtō (a type of udon) stewed in miso with kabocha squash, Chinese cabbage, carrot, taro and the like.
- Chūetsu region
  - Momiji-nabe (venison-nabe). Typical ingredients: venison, burdock, shiitake mushroom, Welsh onion, konjac, tofu, green vegetables, stewed in a miso-based broth.

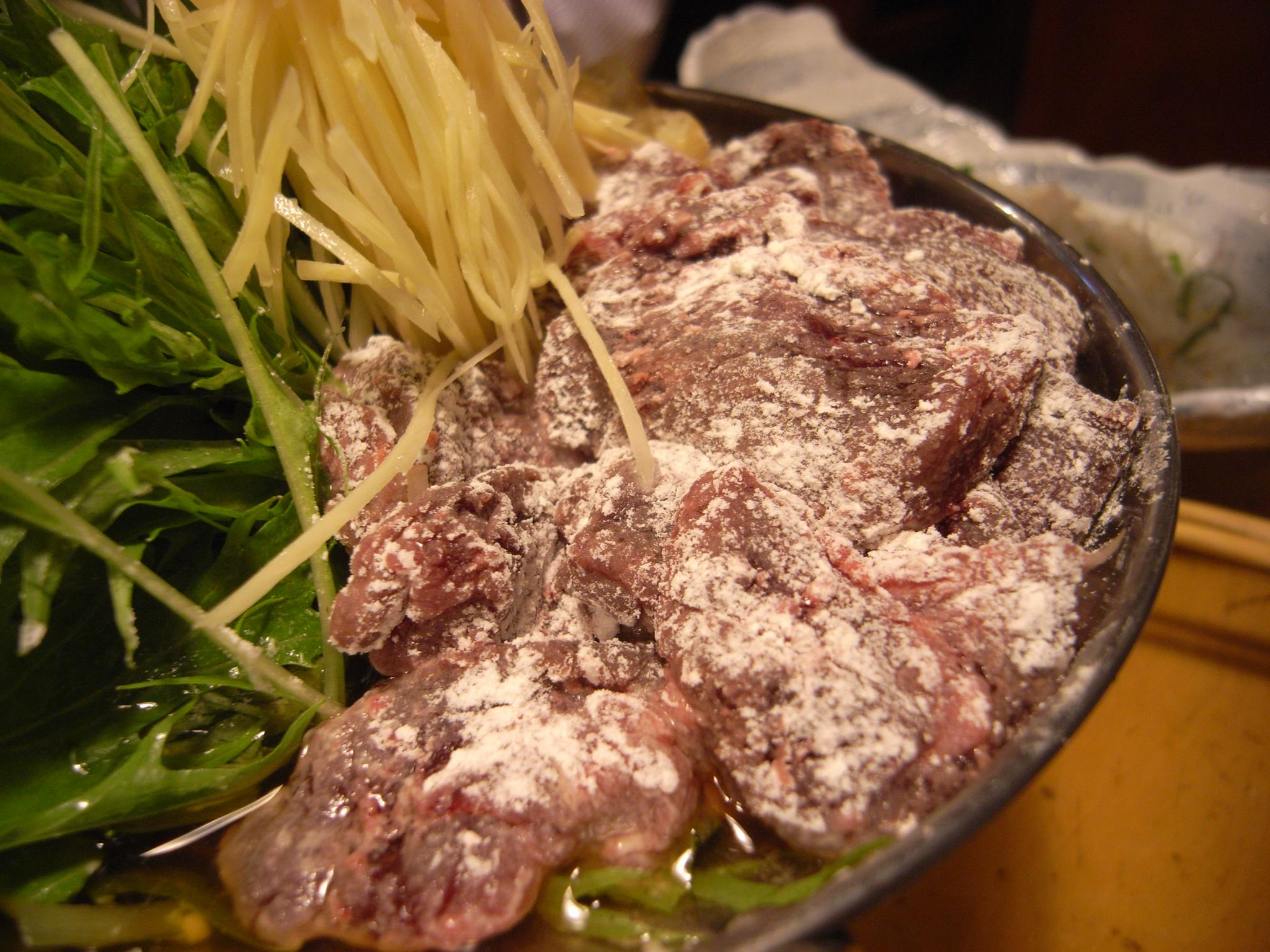
Harihari-nabe

- Kansai region
  - Udon-suki: udon stewed in broth with various ingredients.
  - Harihari-nabe: whale meat and mizuna. Specialty of Osaka.
- Chūgoku region
  - Fugu-chiri: Slices of fugu stewed in dashi with leafy vegetables such as shungiku and Chinese cabbage, and eaten with a ponzu dip.
  - Dote-nabe: Oyster and other ingredients (typically Chinese cabbage, tofu and shungiku stewed in a pot with its inner lining coated in miso.
- Shikoku region
  - Benkei no najiru: (na means green vegetables, and jiru means soup) is made with duck, wild boar, chicken, beef, pork, daikon radish, carrot, mizuna, hiru (a kind of shallot), and dumplings made from buckwheat and rice.
- Kyūshū region
  - Mizutaki: chicken pieces and vegetables stewed in a simple stock, and eaten with dipping sauce such as ponzu. Ingredients include Chinese cabbage, Welsh onion, shiitake or other mushrooms, tofu, shungiku, and shirataki noodles.

== Sauces ==
Nabemono are usually eaten with a sauce sometimes called tare, literally "dipping". Several kinds of sauce can be used with additional spices, called yakumi. Typical yakumi include grated garlic, butter, red pepper, a mixture of red pepper and other spices, roasted sesame, or momiji oroshi (a mixture of grated daikon radish and red pepper).

- Ponzu: The common ponzu is made of soy sauce and juice pressed from a bitter orange, sweet sake, and kombu (kelp) stock.
- Gomadare (sesame sauce): Sesame sauce is usually made from ground sesame, soy sauce, kelp stock, sake and sugar.
- Beaten raw egg: Most commonly used as the sauce for sukiyaki.

== See also ==
- Eintopf
- Jeongol
- Jjigae
- List of Japanese soups and stews
- Pot-au-feu
- Thai suki
