= Tokusanhin =

Food products associated with regions of Japan

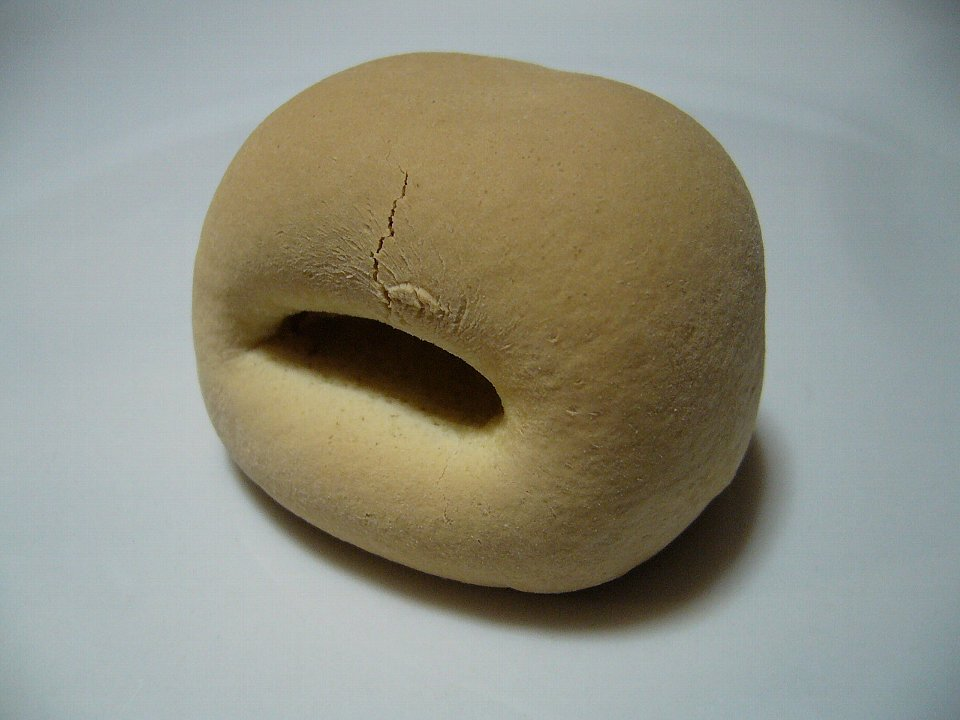
Meibutsu Kamado, a kind of wagashi made in Kagawa prefecture

Tokusanhin (特産品) is a Japanese term for specialty food products associated with particular Japanese regions. Tokusanhin are often showcased in ekiben and packaged as omiyage (souvenirs).

Tokusanhin are a category of meibutsu, regional specialties.

== Examples ==
- Akita
  - Kiritanpo Nabe
- Fukuoka
  - Hakata torimon
  - Mentaiko
- Fukushima
  - Fukushima beef
  - Ikaninjin
  - Kitakata ramen
- Hiroshima
  - Momiji manjū
- Hokkaido
  - Shiroi Koibito
  - Royce'
- Iwate
  - Wanko soba
- Kanagawa
  - Hato Sabure
- Kobe
  - Castella
  - Fugetsudo
- Kyoto
  - Yatsuhashi
- Mie
  - Spiny lobster
  - Matsusaka beef
  - Akafuku mochi
- Nagoya
  - Hatcho miso
- Niigata
  - Noppe
  - Sasa dango
- Osaka
  - Takoyaki
  - Okonomiyaki
  - Chinsuko
- Shiga
  - Ōmi beef
- Shikoku
  - Sanuki udon
- Tokyo
  - Tokyo Banana
  - Yokohama Baumkuchen
- Yamagata
  - Imoni
  - Yonezawa beef

== See also ==
- Meibutsu, famous things, usually associated with particular locales.
- Miyagegashi
- Pasalubong, a gifting tradition in the Philippines also involving regional specialties
