= Cream Box =

Japanese sweet from Fukushima

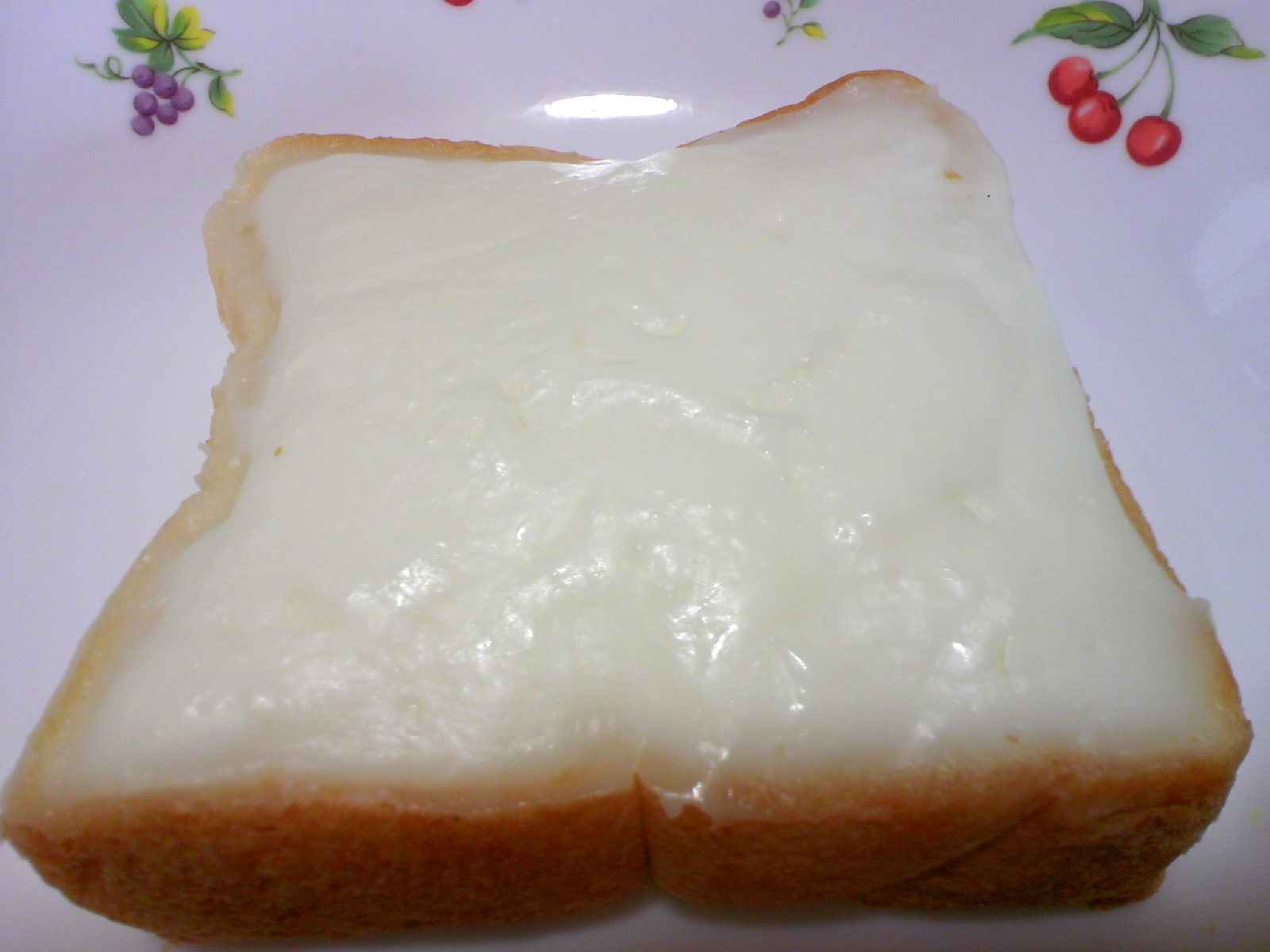
- Type: Sweet bread
- Region or state: Kōriyama, Fukushima
- Created by: Bakery Romeo
- Invented: 1976

Cream Box (クリームボックス) is a Japanese sweet bread from Kōriyama, Fukushima.

Cream Box comprises thick-sliced bread, coated with a milk-flavored cream. It is sold across Kōriyama in bakeries, in the original flavor as well as variations including fruits and coffee.

Several claims for the invention of Cream Box exist, but it is generally credited to have been invented by Bakery Romeo in 1976, in Koriyama City, Fukushima Prefecture.

== See also ==
- Mamador
- Usukawa Manju
