= Miyagegashi =

Japanese souvenir sweet

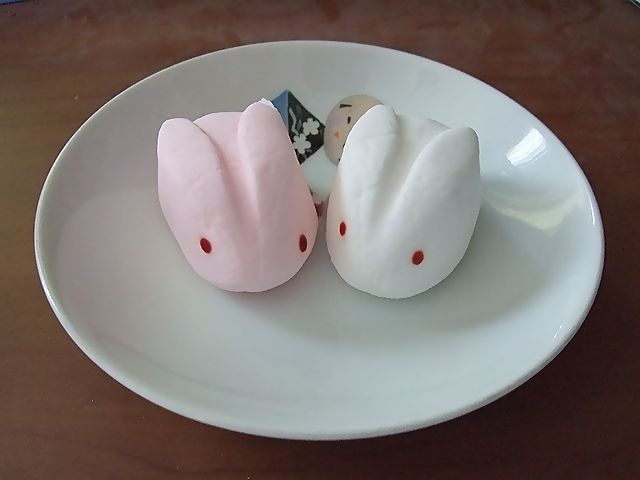
Yuki-usagi from Fukuoka

Miyagegashi (土産菓子; also miyagekashi; lit. 'souvenir sweet') refers to a sweet made with the purpose of selling it as a souvenir. As with most other Japanese souvenirs (omiyage), the typical miyagegashi is a regional specialty (meibutsu) and cannot be bought outside its specific geographic area. The making and selling of omiyagegashi is an important part of Japan's souvenir (omiyage) industry.

== List of miyagegashi ==
- Available everywhere:
  - Japanese cheesecake
- Fukuoka:
  - Hakata no Hito, rolled pastry containing red bean paste
  - Hakata torimon
  - Hiyoko
- Fukushima:
  - Awa manju
  - Mamador
- Hiroshima:
  - Momiji manjū
- Hokkaido:
  - Shiroi Koibito
  - Royce'
- Hyōgo:
  - Castella, a sponge cake made of sugar, flour, eggs, and starch syrup. Castella was brought to Japan by Portuguese merchants in the 16th century. The name is derived from Portuguese Pão de Castela, meaning "bread from Castile". Castella cake is usually sold in long boxes, with the cake inside being approximately 27 cm (11 in) long.
  - Fugetsudo
  - Shiome manju – Akō
- Kumamoto:
  - Ikinari dango
- Kyoto:
  - Yatsuhashi, one of the region's best known meibutsu. It is made from glutinous rice flour (上新粉, jōshinko), sugar and cinnamon. Baked, it is similar to senbei. Raw, unbaked yatsuhashi (nama yatsuhashi) has a soft, mochi-like texture and is often eaten wrapped around red bean paste (餡, an), and may come in a variety of different flavours.
- Nagoya:
  - Uirō
- Okinawa:
  - Chinsukō (ちんすこう/金楚糕), a traditional small biscuit made of mostly lard and flour, with a mild and sweet flavor very similar to shortbread.
  - Kippan (桔餅), a variety of citrus peeled and reduced in sugar for up to several days, then dusted with toppings
- Tokyo:
  - Tokyo Banana, which is manufactured and sold by Grapestone Co.. The individually wrapped steamed sponge cake filled with a sweet banana custard went on sale in 1991 and is massively popular.

== See also ==
- List of Japanese desserts and sweets
- Tokusanhin
- Wagashi
