= Kippan =

Okinawan confectionery

Kippan 桔餅
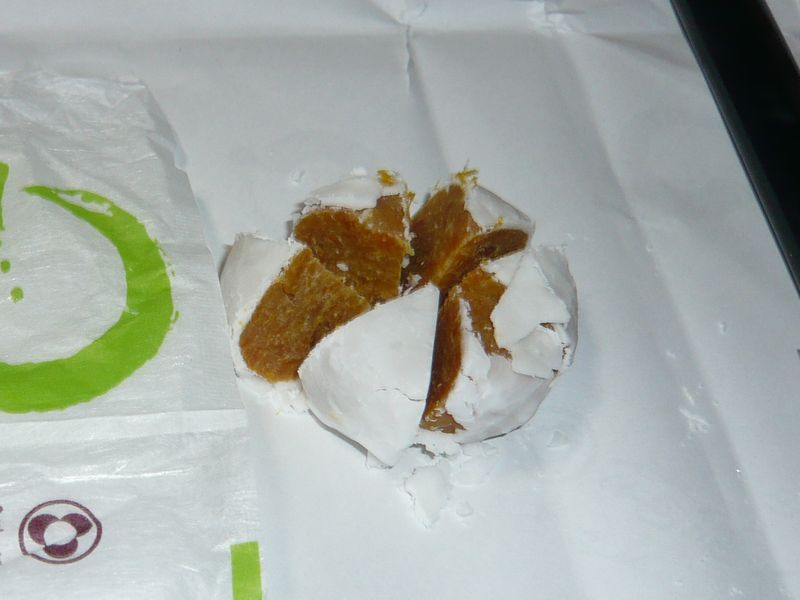
- Alternative names: Chippan
- Place of origin: China, Japan
- Region or state: Okinawa
- Main ingredients: Citrus, sugar

Kippan (桔餅), or Chippan are an Okinawan confection. They are crafted individually by hand from lightly peeled kunibu or kunenbo (九年母) and kābuchī (カーブチー) citrus from Yanbaru, reduced with sugar for several hours, then coated in liquid sugar; sometimes they are dusted with further toppings, such as matcha; the whole process can take up to four days.

Kippan date from the time of the Ryūkyū Kingdom. Understood to have been originally introduced from Fuzhou some three hundred years ago(Kanbun era, 1661-1673), they were served to visiting dignitaries of the Imperial Chinese Missions. Available to the people at large from the Meiji period, today they continue to be made only by one sixth-generation purveyor in Naha. Kippan have been recognized by the Agency for Cultural Affairs as a constituent element of the Japan Heritage "story" Traditional Ryūkyūan Cuisine, Awamori, and Performing Arts of Okinawa that have continued unbroken since the time of the Ryūkyū Kingdom.

== See also ==
- Okinawan cuisine
- Japanese citrus
- Sātā andagī
- Chinsukō
