= Manjū =

Japanese confection

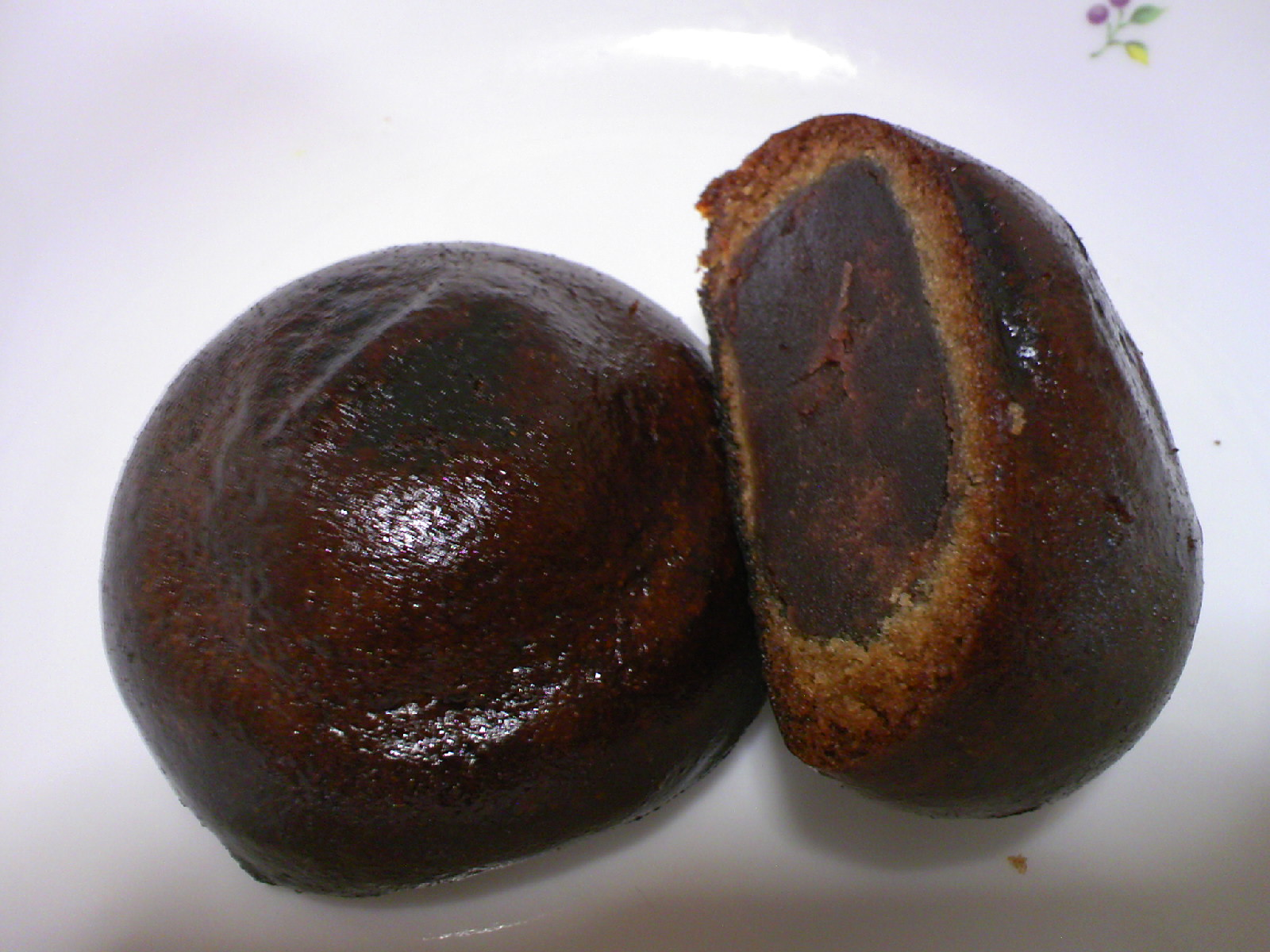
- Type: Wagashi
- Course: Dessert, snack
- Place of origin: Japan
- Region or state: East Asia
- Main ingredients: Flour, buckwheat, red bean paste

Manjū (饅頭; まんじゅう) is a traditional Japanese confection, usually a small, dense bun with a sweet filling. They come in many shapes and varieties.

The standard manjū has a skin made of flour, and is filled with anko (sweet azuki bean paste). Some varieties use kudzu starch or buckwheat flour for the skin. Other types of filling include sweet potato, chestnut jam, or custard.

Manjū is usually steamed or baked, though fried manjū can be found in some modern restaurants. Traditional manjū are usually round, but many different shapes exist today, and some are proprietary to specific bakeries.

== History ==
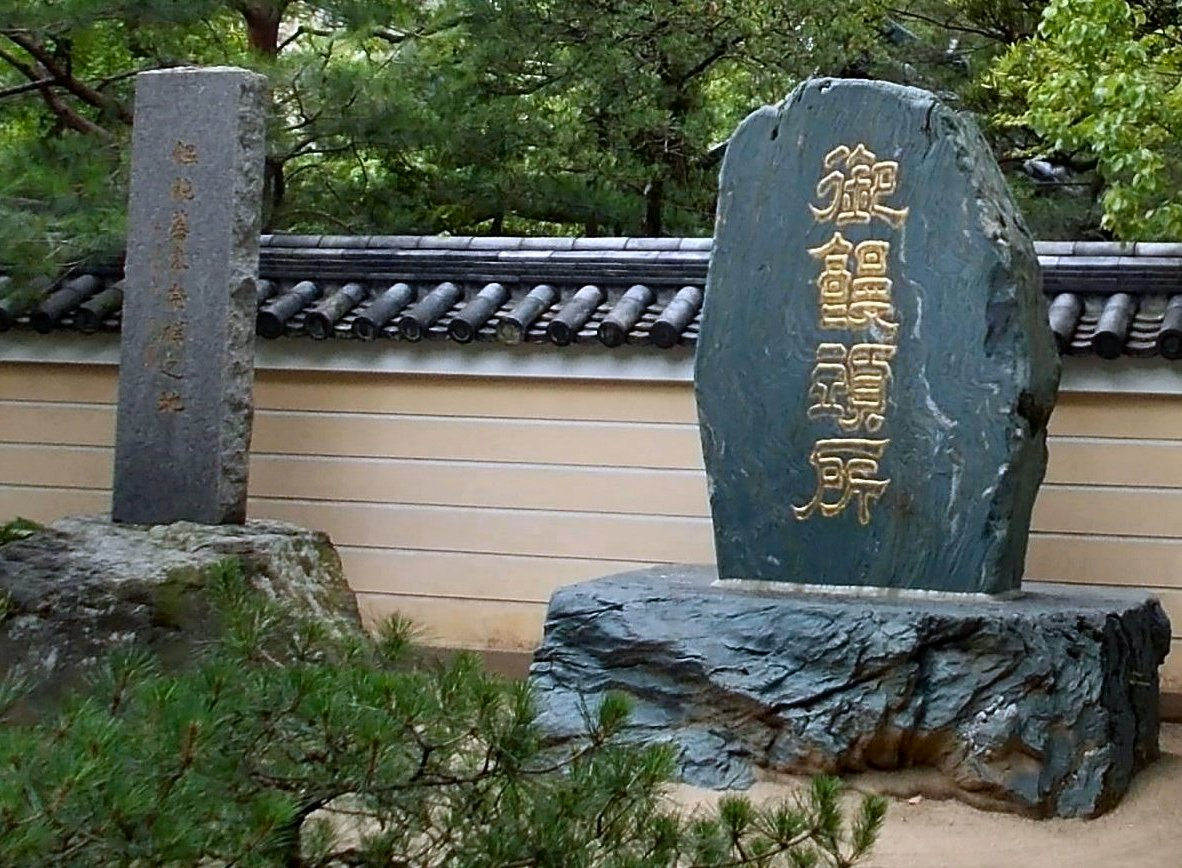
Monuments commemorating the introduction of udon, soba (left) and manjū (right) at Joten-ji temple in Hakata

Manju is a traditional Japanese flour-based pastry (instead of rice-based like mochi). During the Kamakura period (1185–1333), Japanese Buddhist monks who studied in the Song dynasty brought the tea culture to Japan, and the custom of eating confections with tea began in Japan. The monks also introduced tenshin (点心, dim sum), a light meal, and the history book Teikun ōrai (庭訓往来) (c. 1394–1428) mentions udon, manjū, and yōkan as types of dim sum.

There are two major claims regarding who may have introduced the manjū from China (called mantou in Chinese, also written 饅頭). One claim is that when the Zen priest Enni returned from China in 1241, he introduced manjū production techniques during his stay in Hakata, Fukuoka Prefecture, revealing the recipe to a teahouse owner named Kurinami Kichiemon (栗波吉右衛門). As the story goes, Enni founded Jōten-ji, a temple of the Rinzai sect in Hakata, and while making his takuhatsu (begging rounds), he became acquainted with this generous shopkeeper near Mount Aratsu, west of Hakata. Kichiemon's shop name (yagō) was Toraya, and it is further claimed that the teahouse shop owner received from the priest Enni a hand-written signboard with the words "Omanjū Dokoro" ("Place to Eat Manjū"), which has been handed down and is now in possession of Toraya Confectionery at its main branch in Akasaka, Tokyo. There is also a stone monument in the garden of Jōten-ji temple that commemorates the introduction of manjū to Japan.

The other claim credits the introduction to Rin Jōin (Lin Jingyin, (Note: "Lin Chingyin" in Shurtleff&Aoyagi (2021). "Lin Jing Yin" in The East.) 林浄因), a Chinese native who came to Japan in 1341 as an attendant of Ryūsan Tokuken. More specifically, this is the root origin of the so-called Shiose manjū, Shiose being the surname adopted by Lin and his descendants, which also became the name of the manjū shop founded by this family originally in Nara, and later in Kyoto and Edo. (Note: "Shioze" in Shurtleff&Aoyagi (2021).)

The recipes of the two claims are different. The Hakata manjū calls for a sake-starter (Note: sakadane (酒種).) (i.e. kōji mold culture) as leavening agent, while the original Shiose recipe was based on a yeast starter of fermented dough called lao mien (老麺) kneaded into the final dough, and the manjū skin is then wrapped around an adzuki bean paste. Even the original version was sweetened with amazura (vine sap) with a hint of salt, according to a book authored by the head of the Shiose proprietorship, though at least one scholar assumes the original must have been salt flavored (unsweetened). The standard explanation is that the Chinese version at the time typically used meat fillings, which the ascetic (Zen) monk could not use for their tea services, so that it necessarily got converted to a vegetarian version using beans. (Note: Adachi (1981) and (2004) more specifically connects to Zen priest and tea service. (Note: However, one librarian view is that the original manjū brought to Japan by the monks were not sweets as we know them today, but likely to be plain without a filling.) Higuchi also states beans were used as surrogate for meat.) (Note: The yōkan is another classical Japanese confection using sweet bean paste, but this name means literally "sheep soup", and in China was originally made by congealing the mutton stew.)

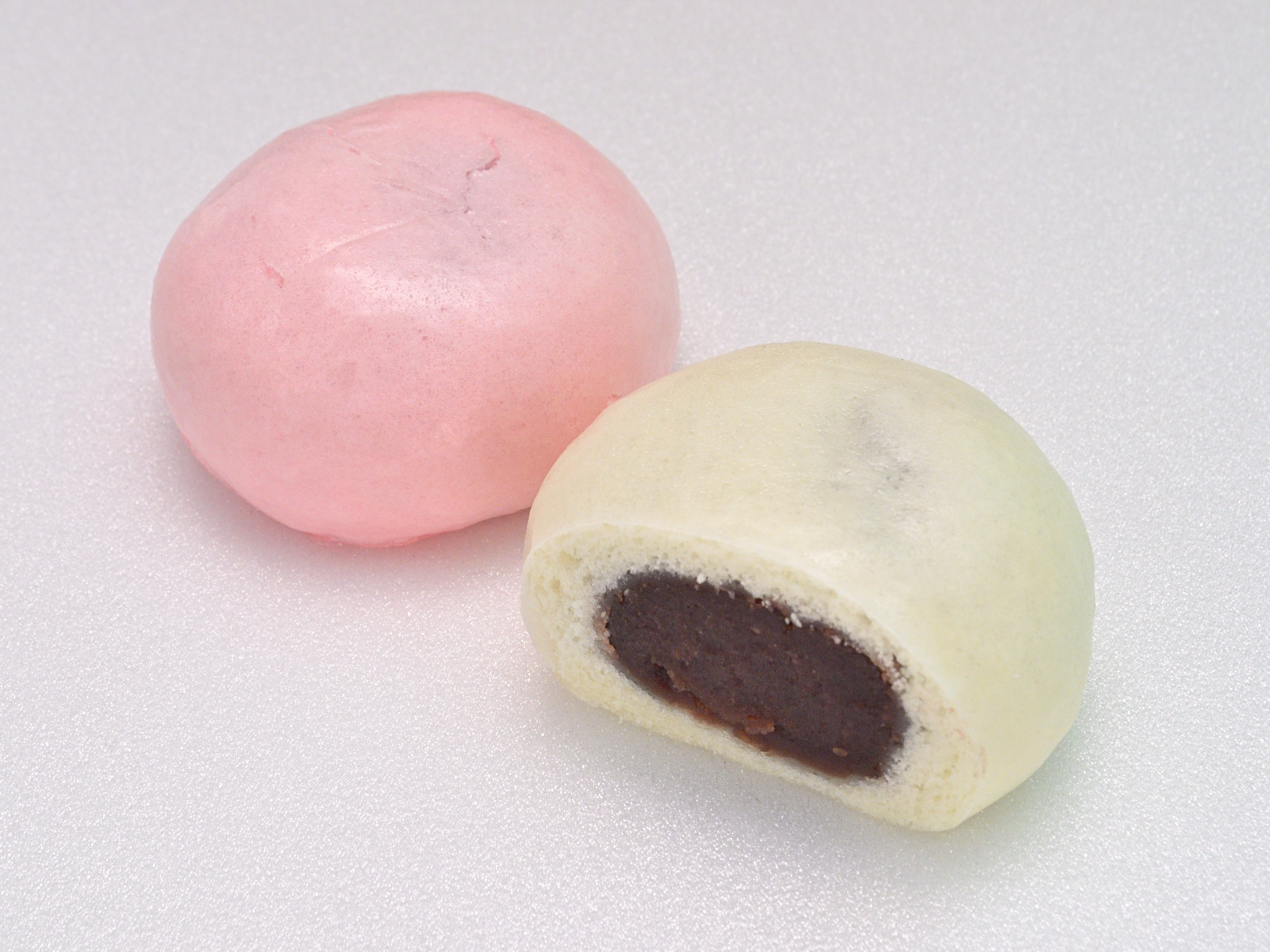
Kōhaku manjū (紅白饅頭; lit. 'red and white manju')

The Sōgo ōzōshi (宗五大草紙) (1528) illustrates in simple line drawing that 3 pieces of manjū were served in each bowl, and placed on a tray alongside chopsticks, bowl of soup, and pickles. The etiquette for eating the manjū was to split one piece, and eating one half while placing the remaining half alongside the other manjū in the bowl, although if preferred (or if a mature adult person is eating), one may eat the whole manjū in a single bite. (Note: Historian Shigeru Sakurai appears to introduce this as an example of sugar-sweetened manjū already in existence by this time.) Also, the manjū are to be served in a rice bowl but covered by a soup bowl lid on top.

Another late Muromachi period source, the Shokunin utaai ehon (職人歌合画本) writes that sweetened sugar manjū and vegetable manjū both need to be steamed thoroughly.

=== Mantō vs. chūka manjū ===
In current Japanese parlance, 饅頭 is usually read "manjū" meaning a confection (sweets) with fillings, but it can also be read as "mantō" (Note: Or written out phonetically in katakana as mantō (マントウ).) to mean the Chinese steamed bread (Note: hakkō mushi pan (発酵蒸しパン; extra-lit. fermented steamed bread), according to Ishige, meaning "leavened steamed bread".) mantou without any fillings; these mantou are consumed as staple food rather than as sweets.

Also, while manjū is generally taken to mean a type of sweets, the savory snack nikuman (short for "meat bun") is an exception. The nikuman is the equivalent to Chinese baozi (or just bao), though the nikuman is usually not sweet, while the Chinese-style baozi may have savory or sweet fillings (char siu bao being rather sweet). The nikuman is also called chūkaman (short for chūka manjū, lit. 'Chinese bun'), though to be more precise, the sweet type filled with bean paste called anman, (as well as the newly invented pizza-man) are considered to be types of chūka manjū also. These chūka manjū are part of standard fare offered at convenience store chains. (Note: Not just frequently bought, but a familiar sight (and therefore iconic) because convenience stores prominently display them (inside tall showcases called "steamers") right at the counter, hence dubbed "counter foods" by the Japanese konbini industry (alongside fried food and oden). Note that "steamer" is only meant to steam the pre-cooked buns to the extent of heating the buns and keeping them warm, and it is "not a cooker".) (Note: In the Kansai dialect, nikuman meant beef bun, while butaman meant pork bun, but this distinction has waned with the spread of national convenience store chains.)

== Varieties ==
Myriad varieties of manjū exist, some more common than others.

=== Varieties of skin ===
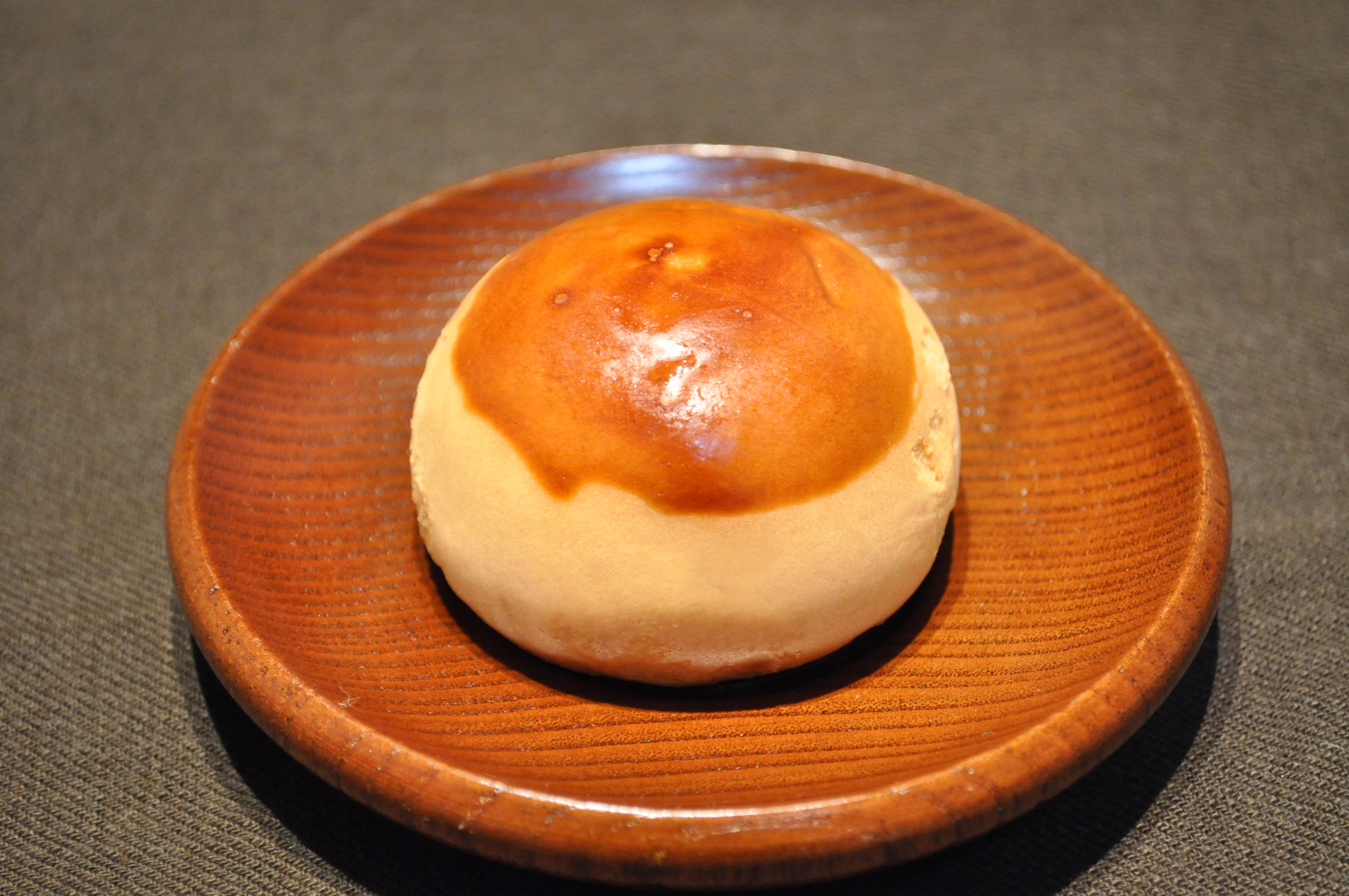
Typical koban-shaped Kuri manjū

The most common type of manjū uses wheat flour-based skin or crust, which are steamed and thus called mushi manjū. However, if the flour-based dough uses sakadane (sake starter, i.e. kōji mold) as leavening agent, the steamed manjū is referred to as Sake Manjū(saka manjū (酒饅頭)). There is also a type called the jōyo manjū (薯蕷饅頭) which uses dough combined with grated yamaimo (Note: Grated yam turns into a sort of slimy purée.) (general term for yam or Dioscorea spp.). It is tsukune imo (fist-shaped/globular cultivar of Chinese yam rather than the long type) that is typically used, with the purpose of making the dough rise fluffier. (Note: Hanako for Men, sidebar right: "..薯蕷饅頭をふっくらさせるつくね芋（山芋）もなくてはならない材料だが..")

The oni manjū (lit. 'ogre dumpling') has diced blocks of sweet potato sticking out of its steamed skin, and has no fillings. This was simple fare that gained momentum during the food shortages of World War II and the postwar. Some claim this manjū already existed prior to wartime, but the exact origins are uncertain. It is billed as a specialty sweets of Nagoya and surrounding areas of Aichi Prefecture, The name supposedly comes from the protruding corners of the sweet potato being reminiscent of the horns of the Japanese ogre or oni, or the studded metal clubs (kanabō) that the oni carry.

Matcha (green tea) manjū is one of the most common variation on the basic crust, in this case, the outside of the manjū has a green tea flavor and is colored green.

A yaki manjū (baked or fried manjū) are not steamed like the typical manjū. There are oven-baked manjū such as the kuri manjū ("chestnut dumpling"), kasutera manjū ("Castella cake dumpling"), and tō manjū (lit. 'Tang/China dumpling').

The kuri manjū (shown right) is a representative type of yaki manjū. Traditionally an oval (koban-shaped ) manjū made by wrapping either chestnut paste or white sweet bean paste (navy bean) with pieces of chestnut in flour dough, giving it an egg wash (yolk cut with mirin), and baking so that a lustrous sheen of chestnut color appears on the top surface.

=== Varieties of fillings ===
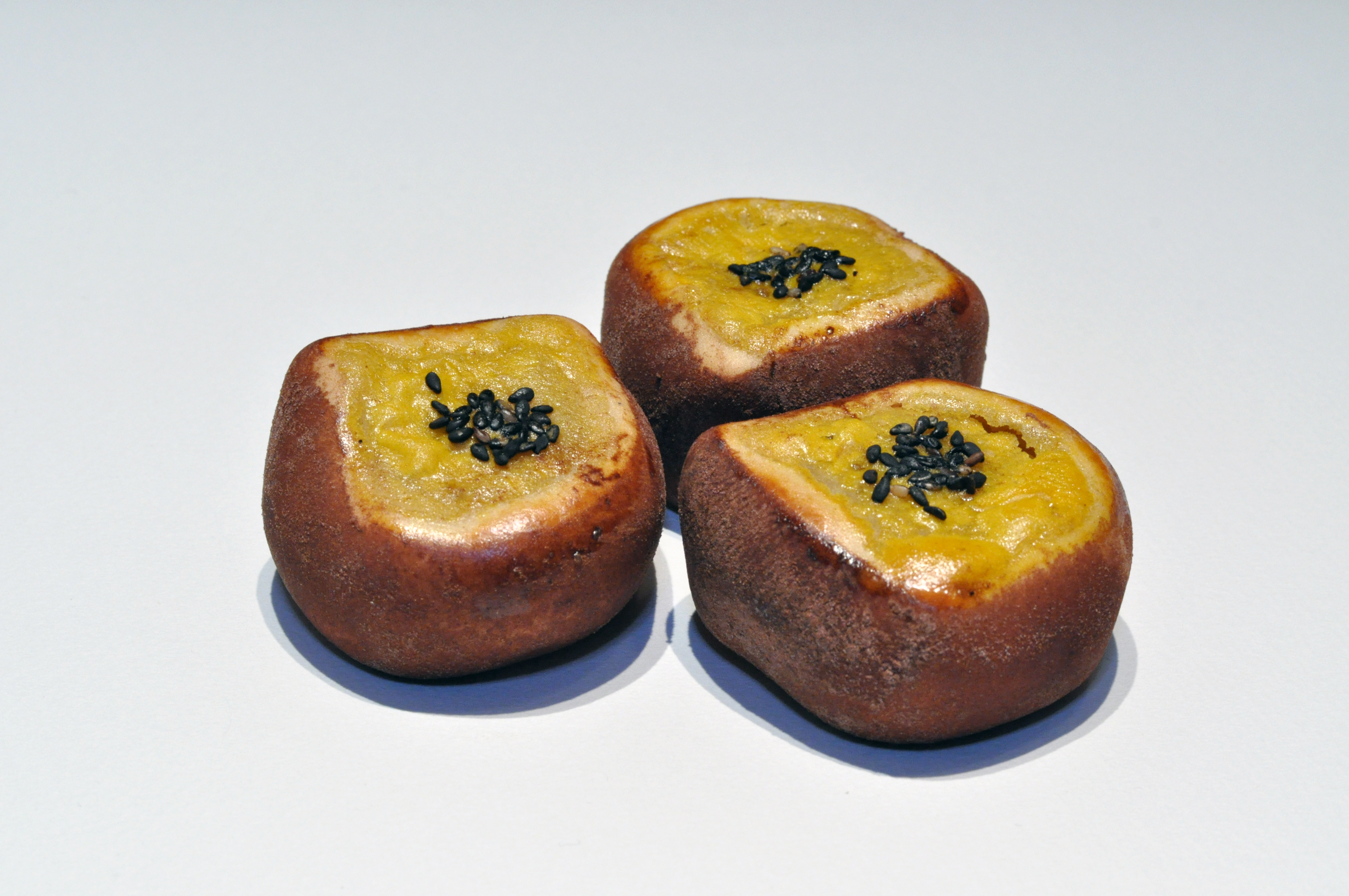
Imo manjū

The most common filling (an) is adzuki an (red bean paste), but sweet bean paste of other beans are also used (such as white shiro an, usually from ingen or navy beans), as well as imo an (sweet potato paste, shown right). (Note: Imamura citing Kashiwa funabashi (『菓子話船橋』) (1841), used as reference into the 1920s.) (Note: Rather unusually, sweetened stewed nagaimo (Chinese yam) or lily bulbs have been used as an.)

The adzuki red bean paste may be cruder tsubu an (aka tsubushi an), which is a "with pulp" version that still has bits of beans left in the paste, or smoother koshi an which have been strained through.

The sekihan manjū uses sekihan (red bean rice) as filling.

The banana manjū of Ikeda, Hokkaido is banana-shaped manjū that uses banana flavoring in the white bean paste filling. It began sales at the train station's opening in 1904.

A proprietor of the momiji manjū ("maple leaf" shaped manjū) of Hiroshima has come up with a seasonal variety filled with mikan orange cream.

=== Kuzu manjū ===
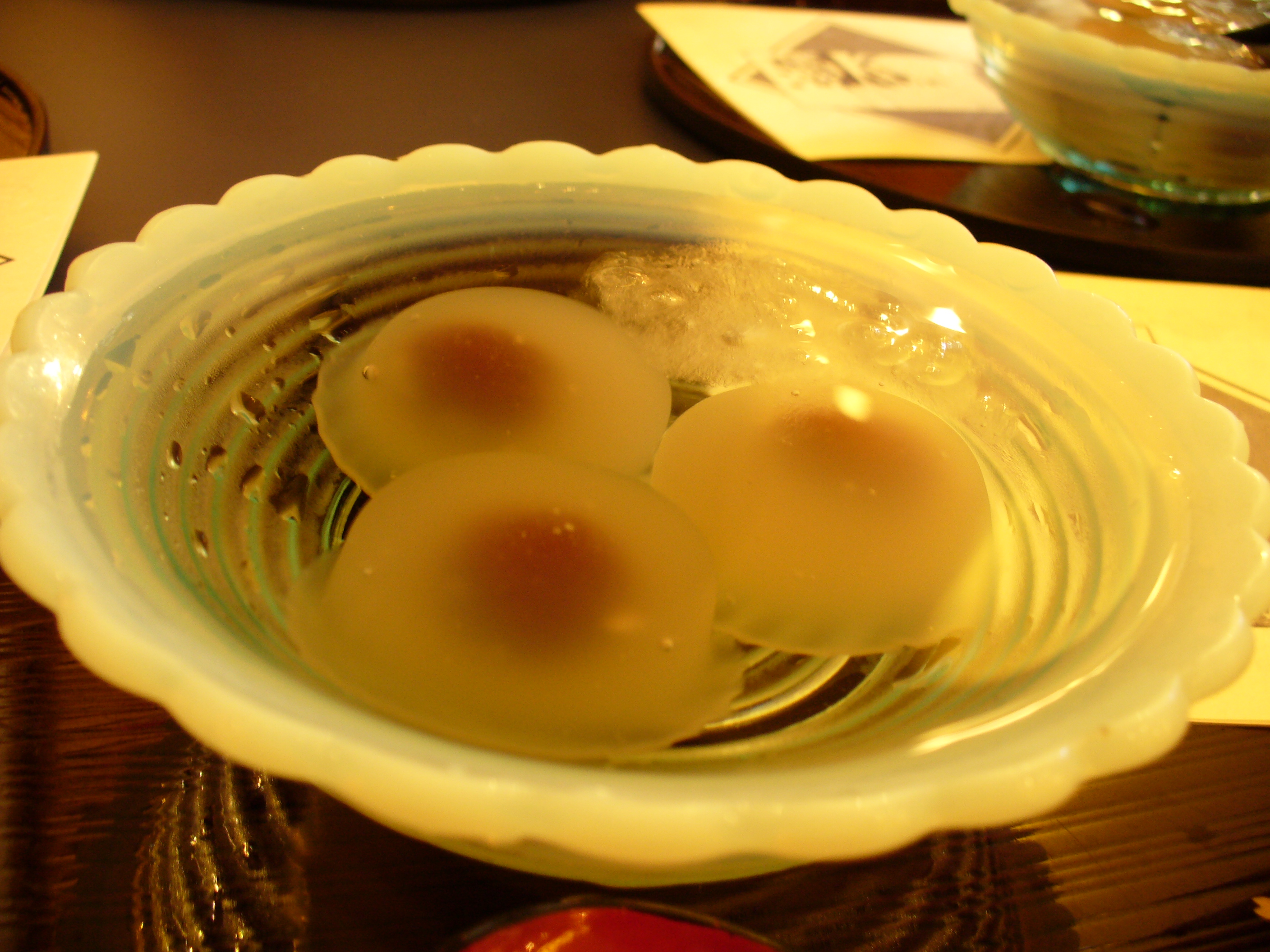
Mizu manjū (水饅頭)

The specialty shops in Obama, Fukui offer kuzu manjū that are not steamed but processed by placing the hot-dissolved kuzu starch (with bean paste trapped inside) into molds, then cooling these in cold water tanks. Traditionally, the confection has been molded using largeish choko (sake cups), and chilled in water tubs fed from welling spring water. (Note: Iseya (in business since 1830 offering this item) in Obama city may have been the originator of this confection.) It has a gelatinous outer texture, and translucent revealing the an (bean paste) inside.

Mizu manjū ("water manjū", shown right) is a specialty item of Ōgaki, Gifu, and can be identically described as the aforementioned kuzu manjū, except that the recipe calls for an addition of warabiko ("bracken starch") into the kuzu starch mix which is supposed to help keep the product from turning watery as it is also chilled in water tanks fed by spring or river water. It also has a translucent, jelly-like appearance.

According to 1920s cook book, a kuzu manjū of a sort can be recreated at home by dissolving kuzu starch, wrapping bean paste into this skin or dough, and steaming. Nowadays, prepackaged quick mixes called Mizu manjū no moto are sold in stores, with pre-combined kudzu starch, other starches, and agar for easy preparation at home.

=== Regional manjū ===
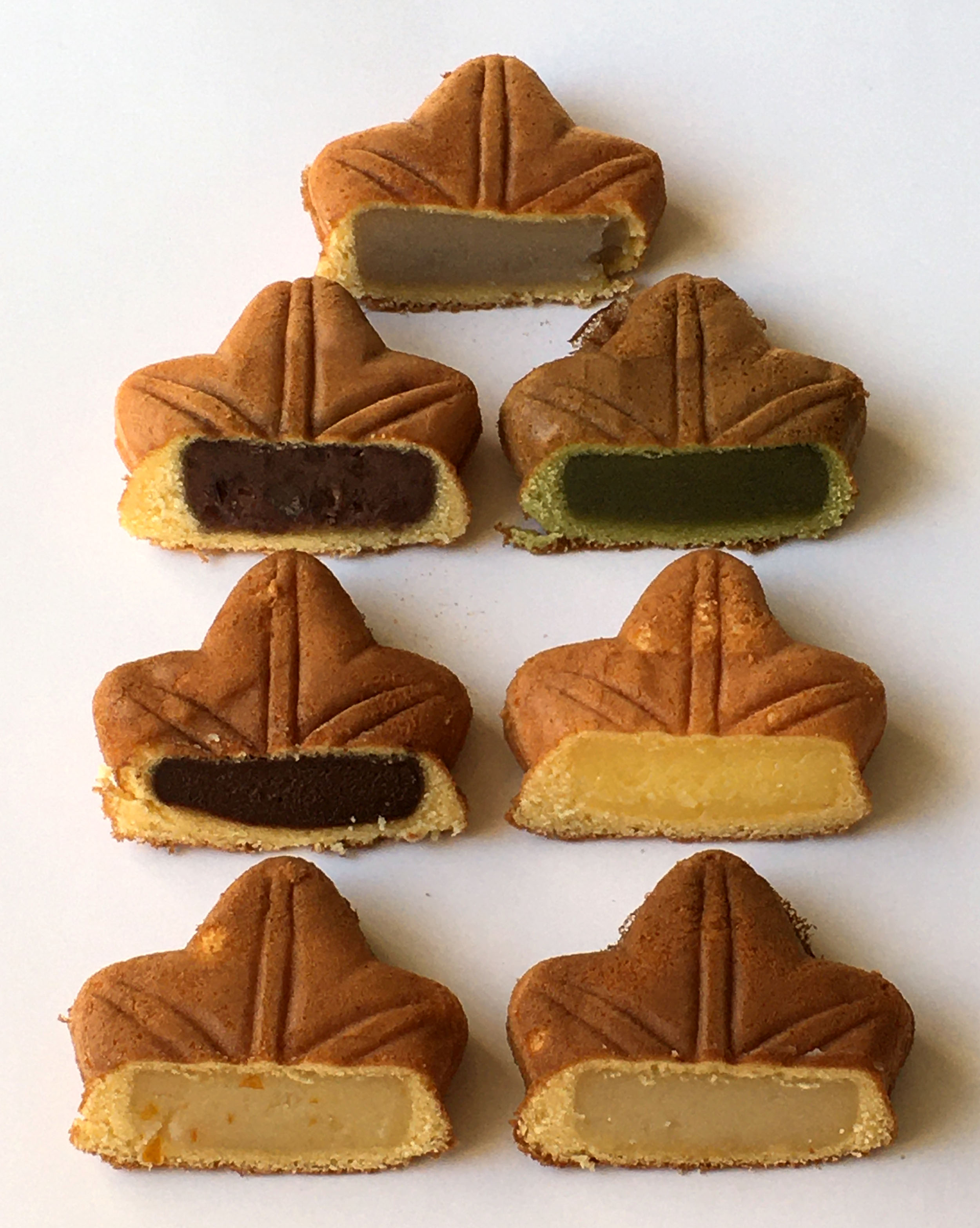
Momiji manjū with different fillings

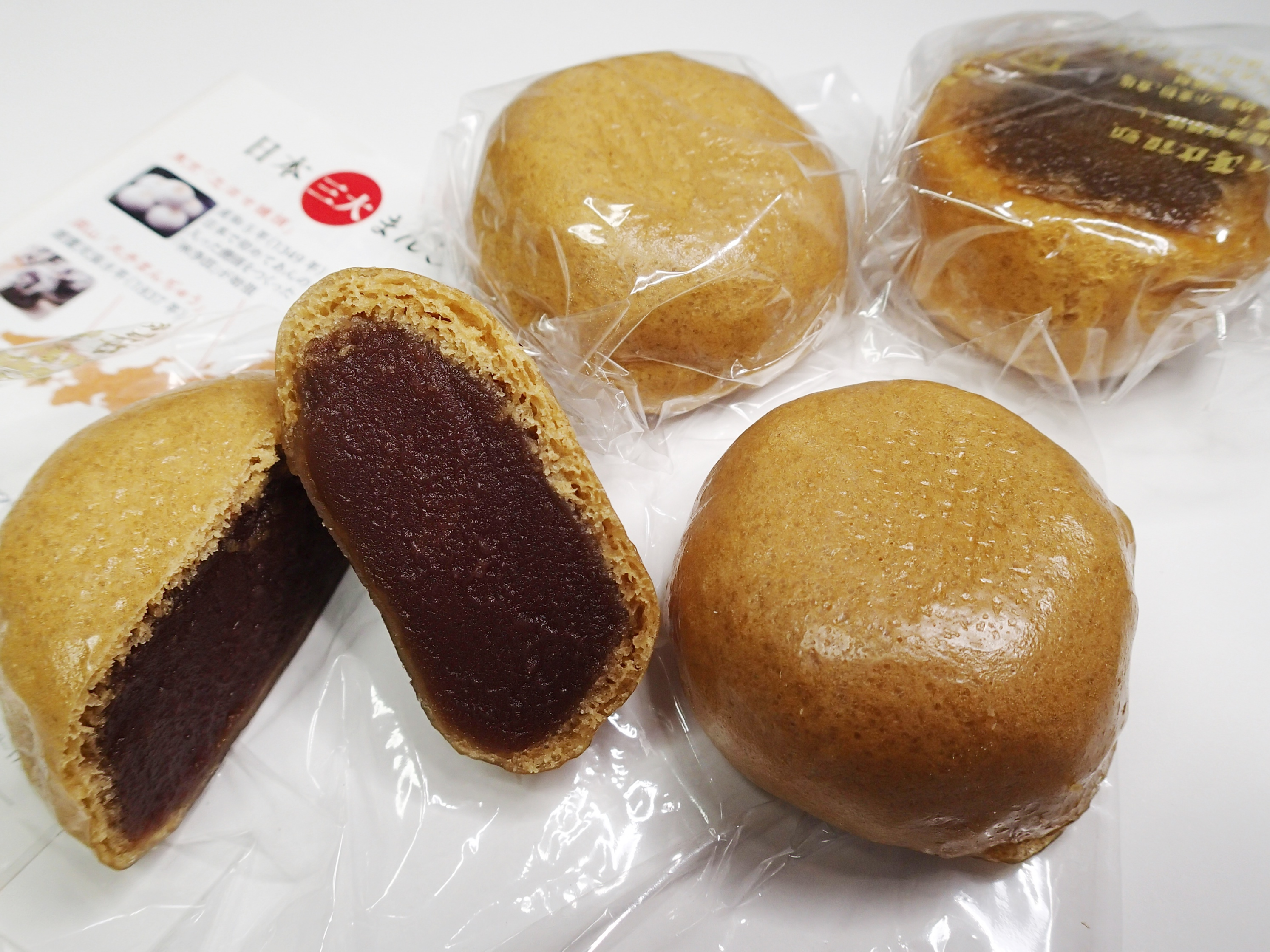
Usukawa manjū of Kōriyama, Fukushima. A leaflet on the "3 great manjū of Japan" is visible underneath.

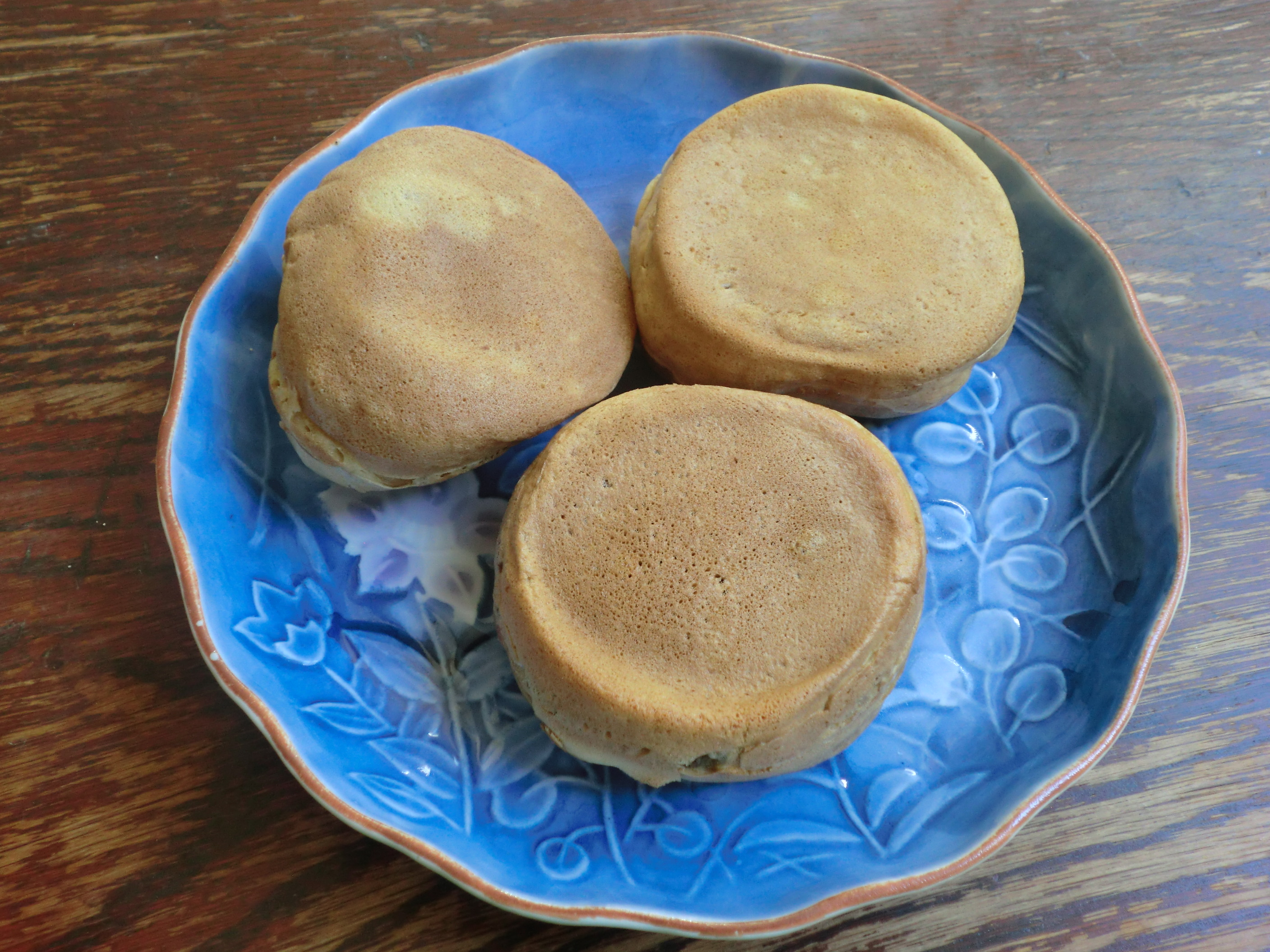
Horaku manjū

As is the case with many Japanese foods, in some parts of Japan, one can find manjū unique to that region.

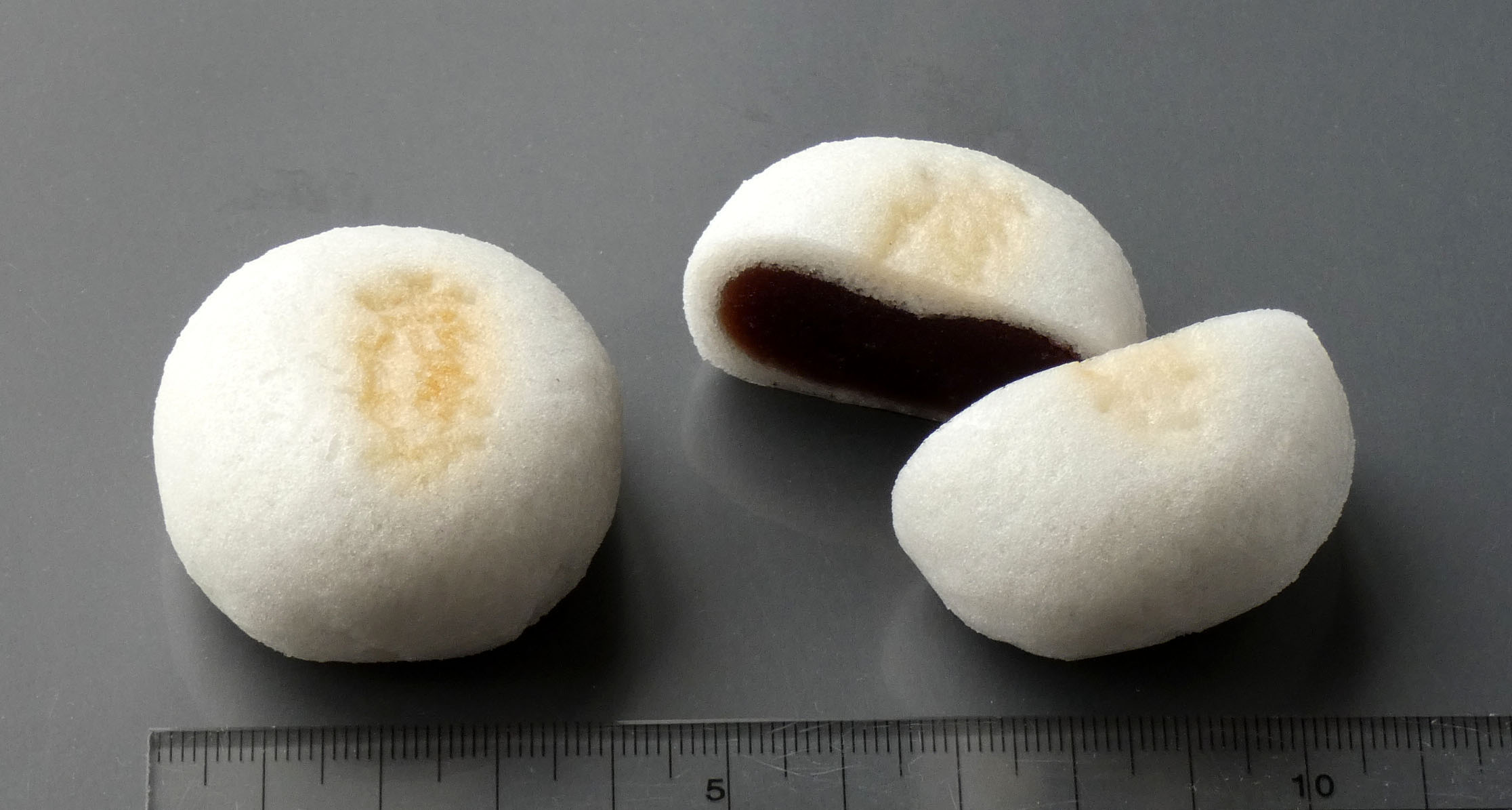
Shiose manjū of Tokyo

The maple leaf-shaped momiji manjū (q.v., shown right) in Hiroshima and Miyajima is fairly well-known.

The usukawa manjū (Note: The "usukawa manjū" was already used as the name of one of the confections which Toraya presented to the Imperial household according to a record of 1635, so the 1852-founded Kashiwaya in Kōriyama should not be mistakenly credited for devising this name.) (shown left) is a specialty of Kōriyama, Fukushima, made at the shop Kashiwaya founded in 1852. It is so named due to the thin skin wrapped around the sweet bean paste. It has a distinctive dark brown skin, since the dough is blended with dark brown sugar (Japanese kurozatō) and brown sugar syrup; the thin skin is then wrapped around ample amounts of koshi-an (strained red bean paste) filling. The shop also now offers a tsubu-an (unstrained paste) variety.

Kashiwaya's usukawa manjū is promoted as being one of the "3 great manjū of Japan", the others being the aforementioned Shiose manjū now based in Tokyo (shown lower left), and the Ōte manjū made by Ōte Manjū Inbeya of Okayama City. The three were named in a 1993 book compilation themed on top 3 rankers of various categories. (Note: Kase, co-author of the 1993 book revealed that he chose the 3 top manjū proprietors by a survey vote, compiling the results of questionnaires sent to well-known manjū across the country. This revelation was made by Kase when he lectured at the "3-dai manjū summit (13 October 2017).)

The Jūmangoku manjū (lit. '100,000-koku manjū'), a type of jōyo manjū (yam manjū) offered by a proprietor (Note: Jūmangoku Fukusaya (十万石ふくさや).) based in Gyōda, Saitama, has become a specialty representative of the whole Saitama Prefecture. (Note: The original merchandise means "100,000-koku" where koku is a dry measure, about 5 bushels. The actual reference is to the 100,000 koku per annum kokudaka (rice production) of the Oshi Domain, which had ruled Gyōda.) (Note: The print artist Shikō Munakata had said "Umai, umasugiru (delicious, too delicious)" concerning the product and this became the catchphrase. Munakata certainly endorsed the product, since the leaflet or brochure in the box set bears Munakata's calligraphy and name stamp (cf. photo).)

Although hōraku manjū (蜂楽饅頭) (shown right) bears manjū in its name, this local slang around Kumamoto Prefecture for what is otherwise known as imagawayaki in Tokyo, etc., (Thus it hardly really counts as a subtype of manjū). The hōraku manjū is described as a confection made by a proprietorship (Note: Called Minamata Hōraku Manjū.) in Minamata, Kumamoto, where honey-added bean paste gets dropped inside the batter (Note: The term kiji does not distinguish between dough and batter, but one of the sources shows a photograph of the batter in bucket with ladle, and verbally describes the batter as being "drained" into the hot plate cups.) poured into hot plate molds, and fried into round shapes; the fillings may be black bean paste using adzuki or white bean paste using ōtebo (大手亡) (large-sized variety of white common bean). (Note: This, or very similar, type of manjū is also being sold at a street stall in Jōtenji-dōri in Fukuoka, just meters away from the manjū monument on the grounds of Jōten-ji temple, that commemorates manjū being brought from China by monk Enni.)

In Hawaii, one can find Okinawan style manjū that are made with a filling of purple sweet potato (i.e. beni-imo or ube).

== Gallery ==
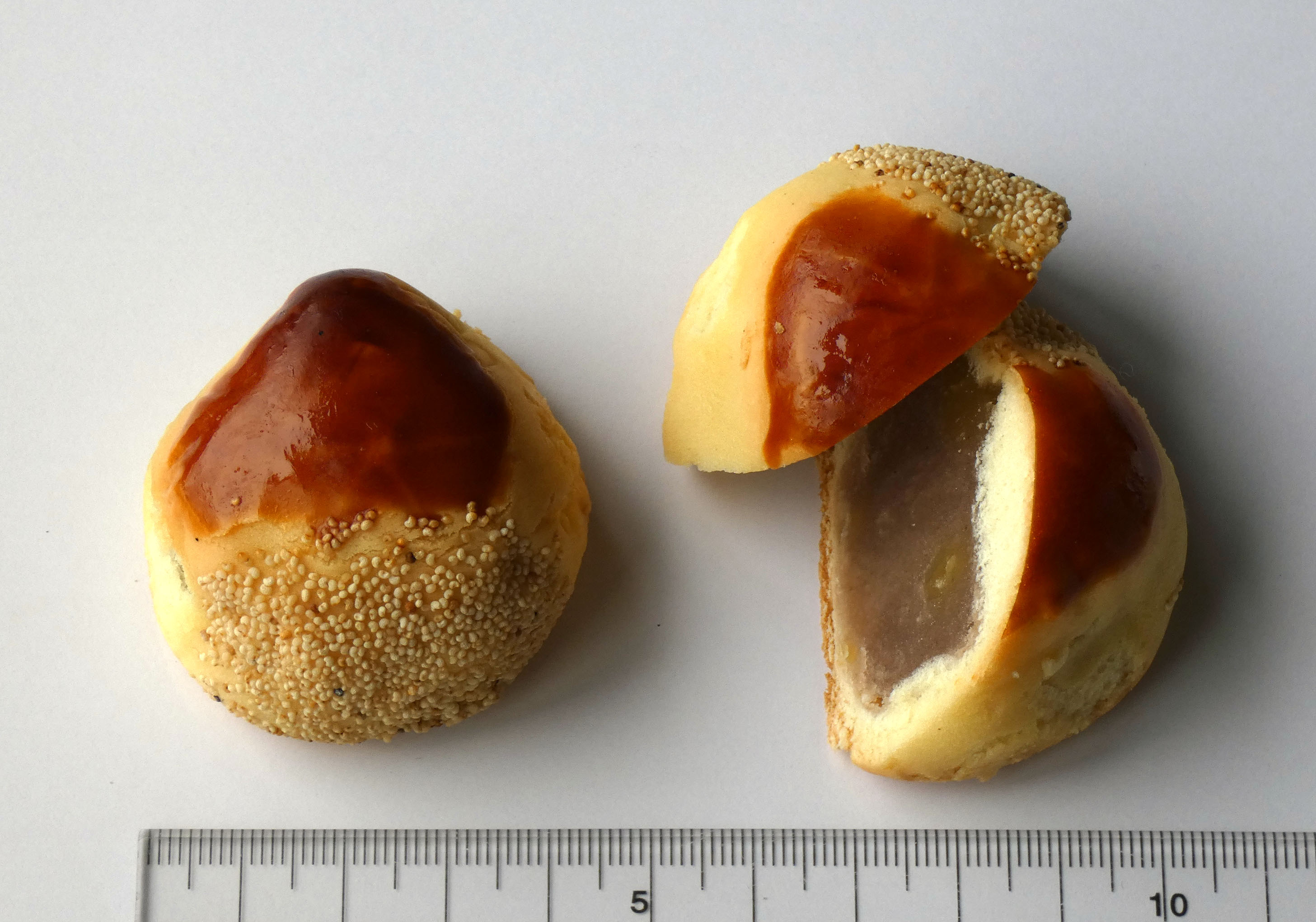
kuri manjū shaped like chestnut, offered by Hōraiya

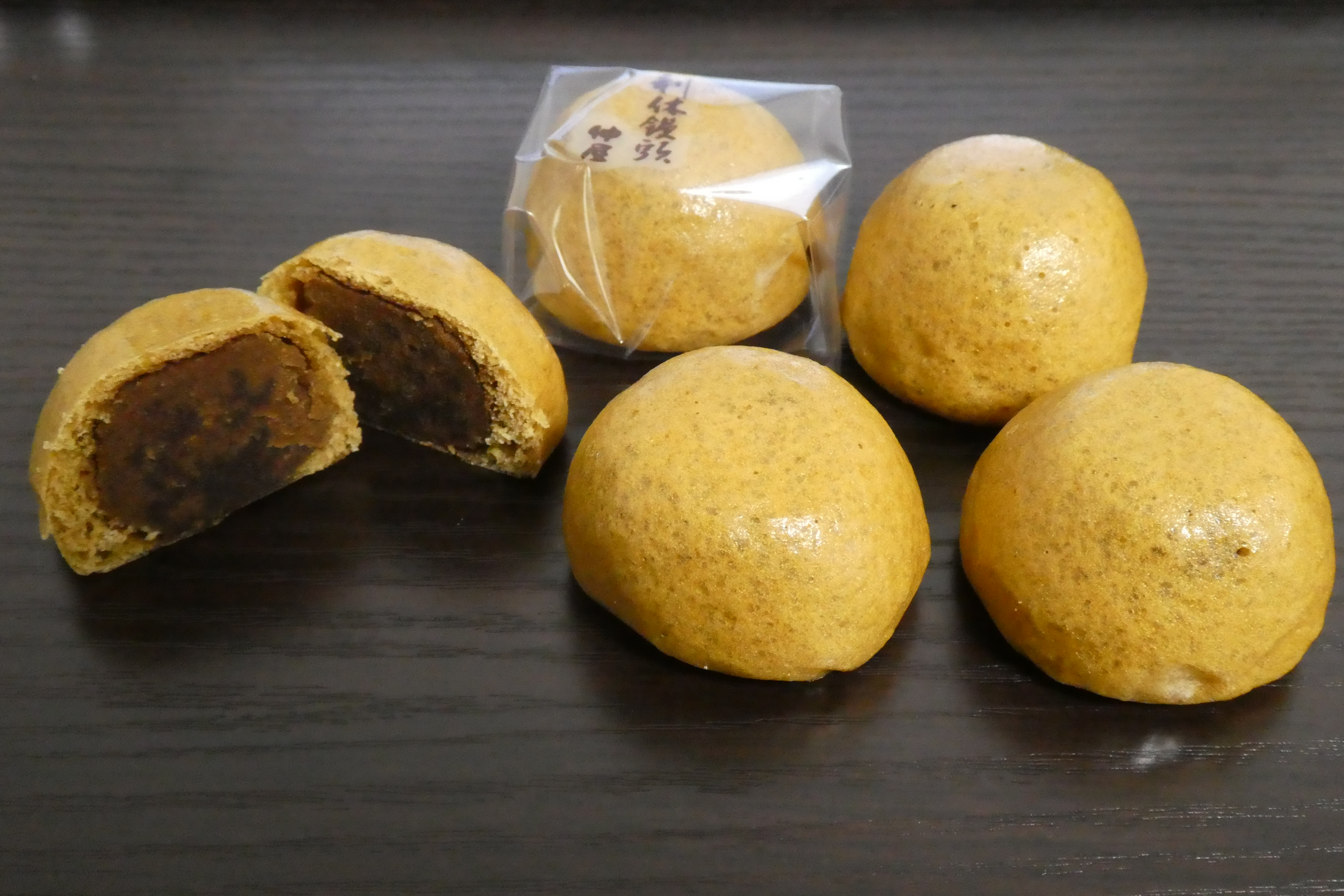
Rikyū manjū of Nakaya, in Hamada, Shimane

== See also ==
- Daifuku
- Dorayaki
- List of Japanese desserts and sweets
- Mamador
- Mantou (饅頭, Chinese plain steamed bun), etymologically the origin of the word, although in modern Chinese the term for filled buns is baozi
- Manti (Turkic) and mandu (Korean), filled dumplings with the names being cognate with mantou and manjū
- Momiji Manju
- Nikuman
- Tangyuan
- Kozhukkatta is a steamed dumpling made from rice flour, with a filling of grated coconut, jaggery, or chakkavaratti in South India.
- Andōnatsu, an erudite manga series containing much info especially about manjū which is the specialty of the shop where the protagonist Andō Natsu works at
