= Omiyage =

Japanese tradition

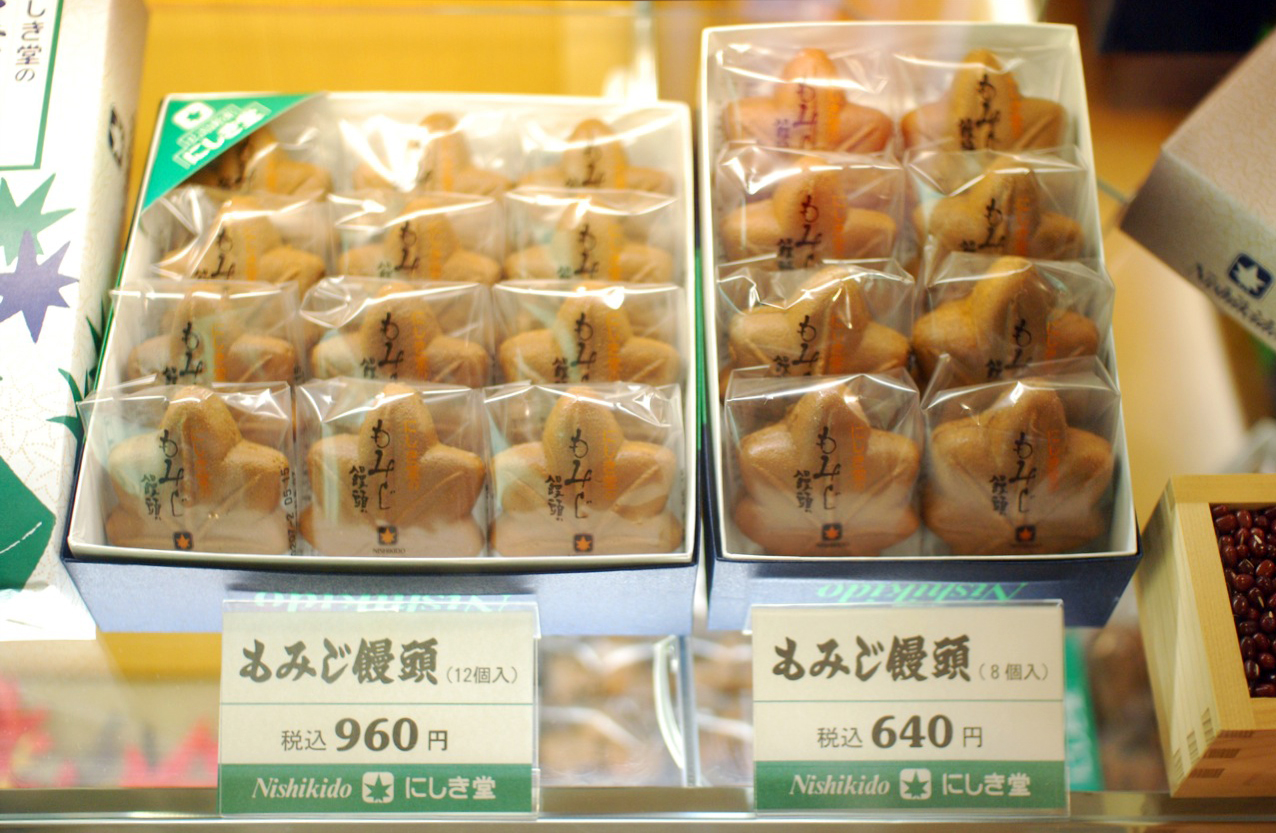
Momiji manju omiyage from Japan

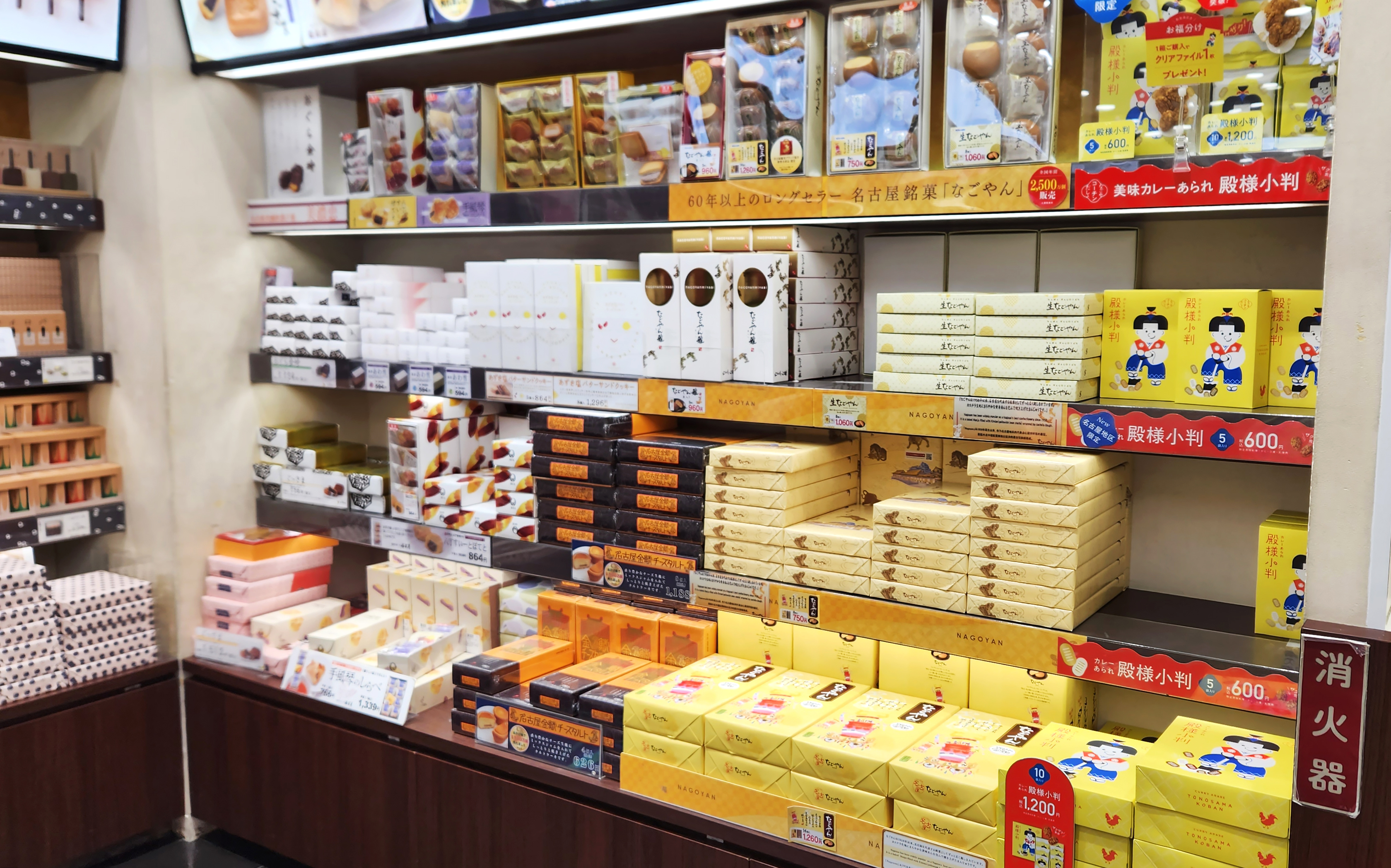
Japanese Omiyage at a souvenir store in Nagoya Station.

Omiyage (お土産) is the Japanese tradition of travellers bringing gifts and souvenirs back from their destination to friends, family, and colleagues. Unlike a souvenir, it is not bought for oneself, and are typically region specific food products packaged into several small portions to be easily distributed to those who did not make the trip.

Omiyage are usually sweet items such as candy, cake, or cookies. However, they can also include alcohol, dry snacks, rice crackers, and so on.

They are frequently selected from meibutsu; products associated with a particular region. Bringing back Omiyage from trips to co-workers and families is regarded as a social obligation, and can be considered a form of apology for the traveller's absence. Omiyage sales are big business at Japanese tourist sites, and are also commonly sold at major transportation hubs, such as airports and large train stations.

Specialty food products associated with particular Japanese regions are called tokusanhin. A similar tradition in the Philippines is called pasalubong.

== See also ==
- One Village One Product movement
- Miyagegashi, confectionery sold as omiyage
- Momiji Dolls
- Tea culture in Japan
