= Tokyo Banana =

Japanese banana-shaped snack cake

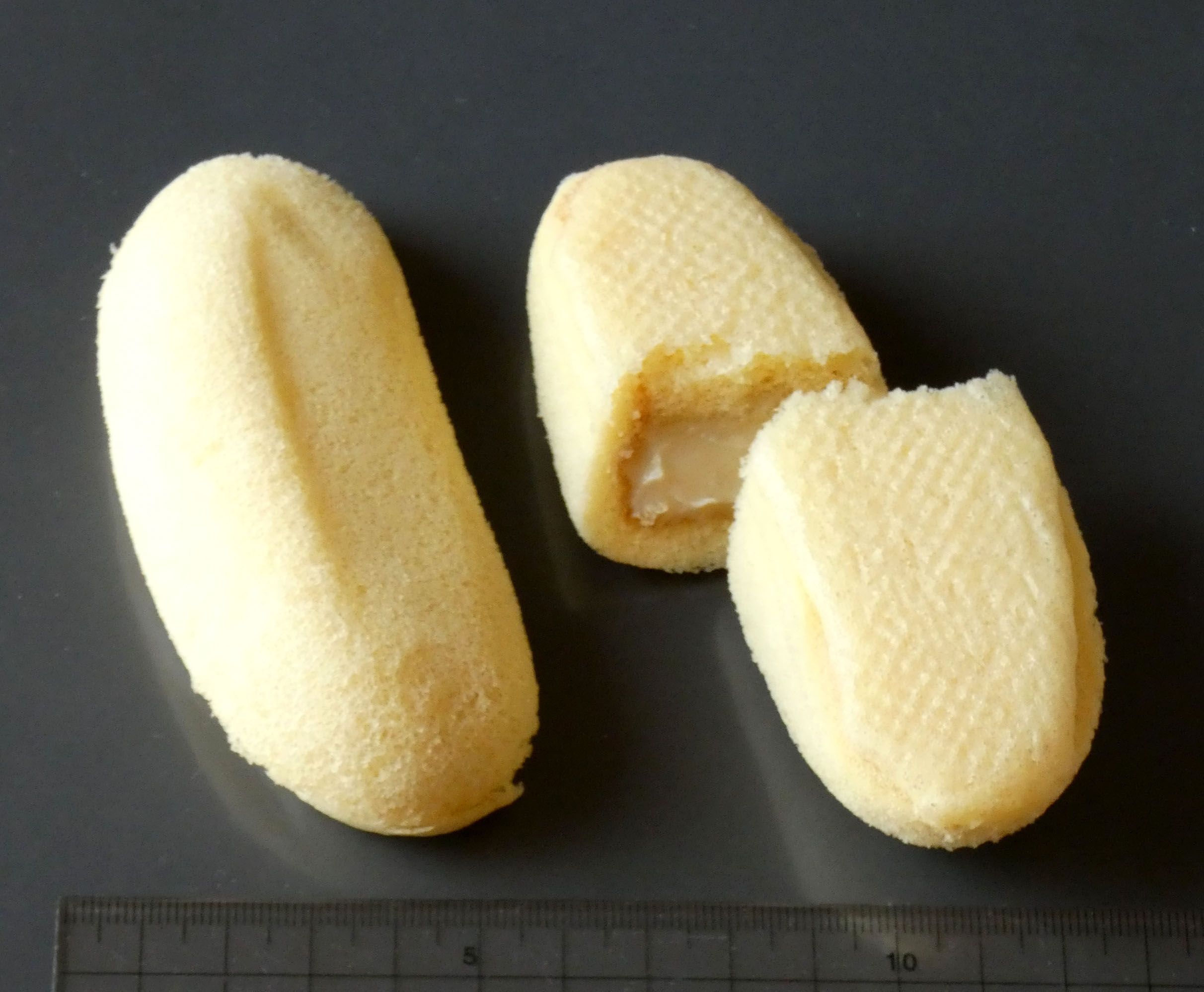
Tokyo Banana

Tokyo Banana (東京ばな奈; also written 東京バナナ or 東京ばなな with the same pronunciation) is a Japanese banana-shaped sponge cake with a cream filling. It is a famous souvenir sweet of Tokyo and is manufactured and sold by Grapestone Co..

Tokyo Bananas come in many different flavors and are usually packaged individually in plastic. The original flavor is known as Tokyo Banana Miitsuketa (見ぃつけたっ), and is filled with a banana custard cream. The cream filling uses strained banana puree. After baking, the sponge cake is steamed to bring out a soft texture.

Tokyo Banana Miitsuketa is manufactured at MASDAC Corporation's factory in Tokorozawa, Saitama. Tokyo Bananas are sold across stores in Tokyo and in several major Japanese airports.

== History ==
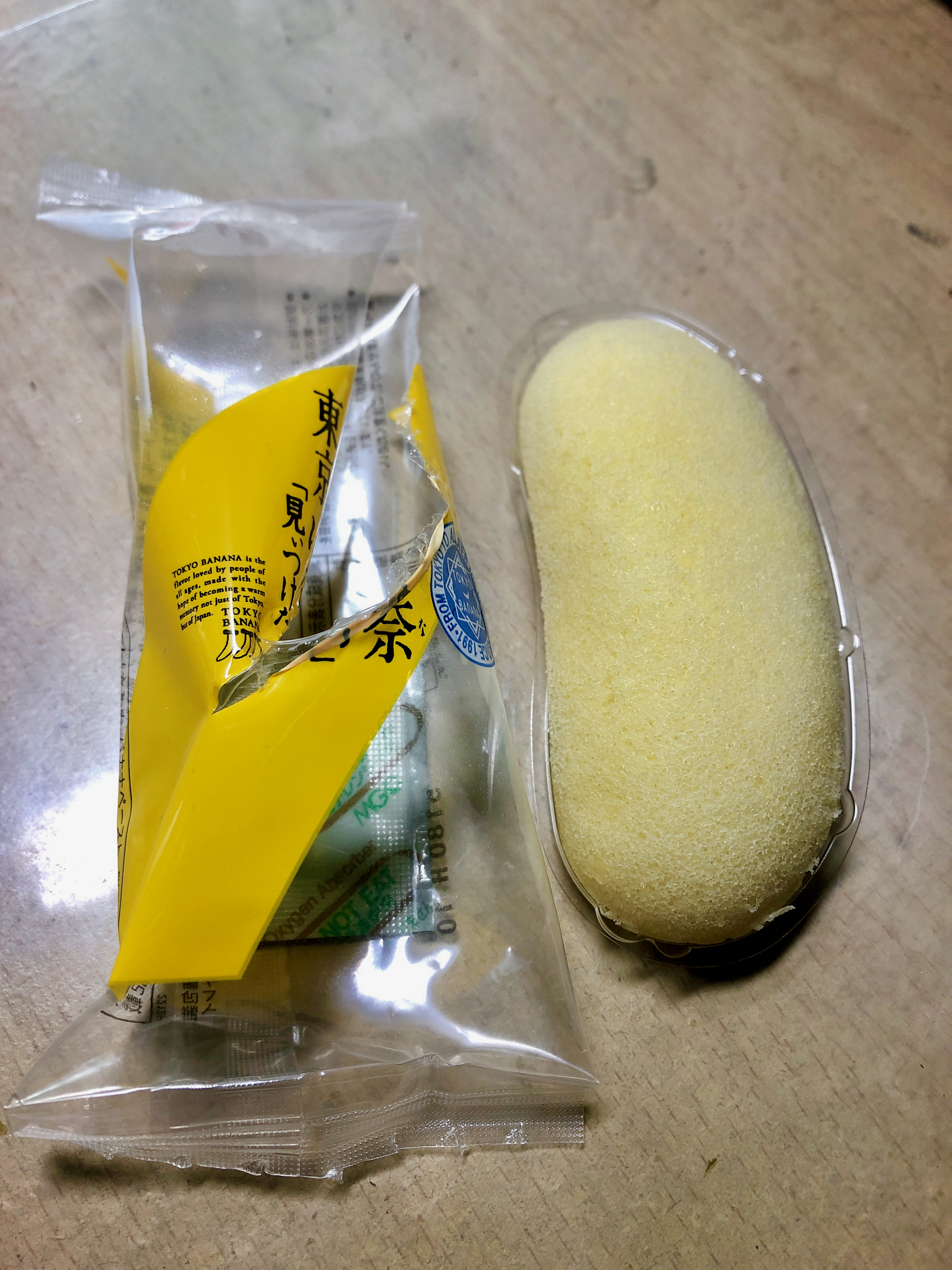
Tokyo Banana and packaging

Tokyo Banana Miitsuketa (見ぃつけたっ), the original banana custard flavor, first went on sale in 1991. Even before Tokyo Banana, there were a large number of souvenir cakes in Tokyo, but Tokyo Banana was the first to include "Tokyo" in its product name.

As of 2016, the yearly sales are roughly 4 billion yen.

The first store selling Tokyo Banana outside of Tokyo was established in Osaka by Grapestone in April 2020 as travel slumped during the COVID-19 pandemic. In 2022, a new flagship store dedicated solely to Tokyo Banana products was opened in Tokyo Station.

== Tokyo Banana Series ==
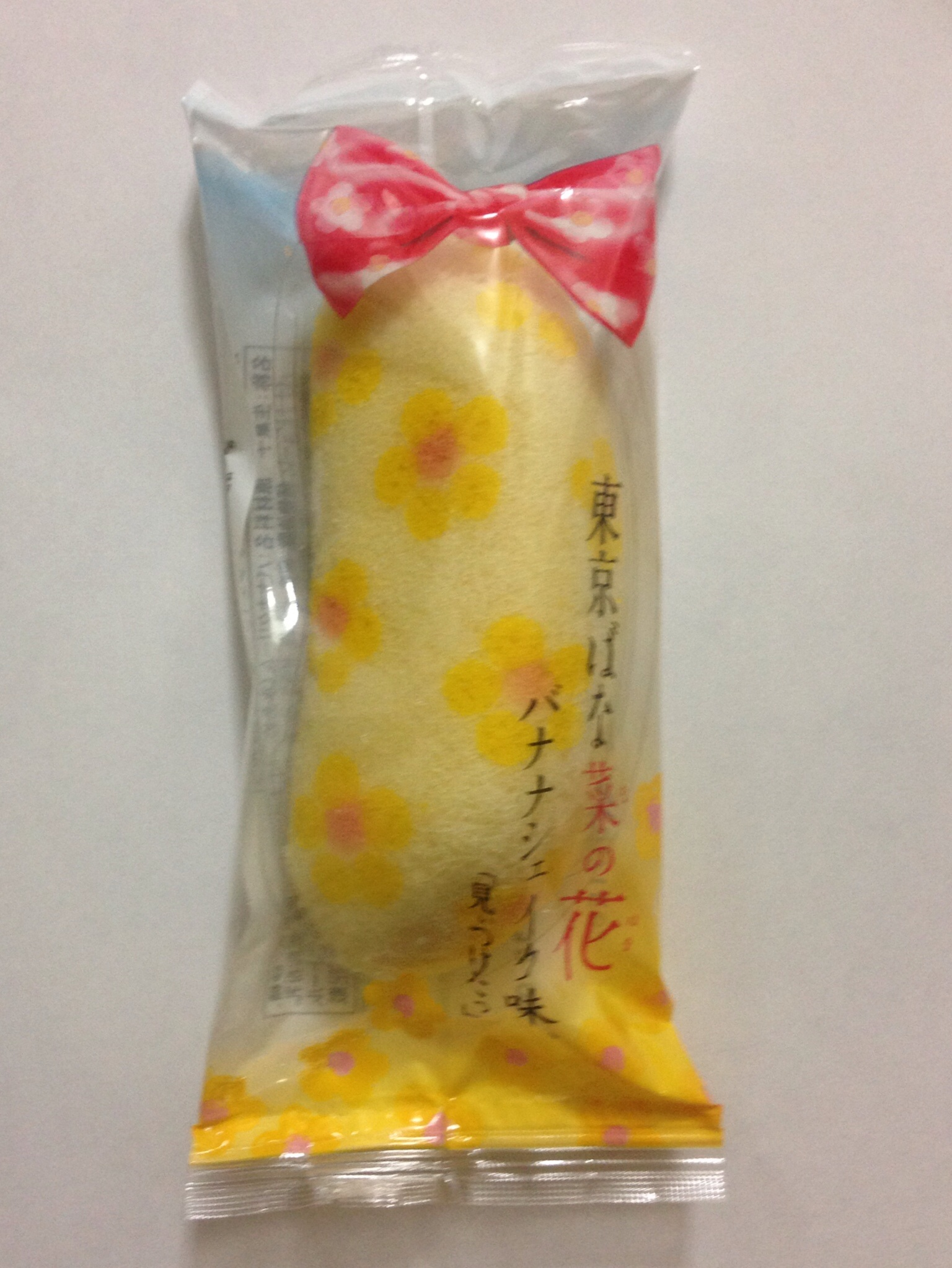
A picture of Tokyo Banana Miitsuketa

- Tokyo Banana Miitsuketa

A banana shaped sweet full of banana custard wrapped in a fluffy sponge. Best consumed within 7 days of purchase, though refrigeration can stretch this a bit.

- Tokyo Banana Miitsuketa caramel flavour

Caramel banana custard cream wrapped up in a caramel coloured and flavoured sponge. Went on sale on August 10th 2011 celebrating 20 years of sales of Tokyo Banana.

- Tokyo Choco Banana

Banana cream inside chocolate. It becomes banana mint flavour "Summer Choco" in the summer season (mid May - mid September).

- Tokyo Banana Pie

Folded up banana flavoured biscuit dough and pastry.

- Fresh Cream Puff

Cream and banana custard cream puff.

- Tokyo Banana Raisin Sandwich

Rum-raisin banana ganache sandwiched between banana scented cookies.

- Wagashi Tokyo Banana

Banana anko in a moist outer layer.

- Moist Baumkuchen

3 layers of cake mixture layered atop one another and moistly baked baumkuchen

- Tokyo Banana Fresh Moist Baumkuchen
- Tokyo Banana Baumkuchen Brule
- Tokyo Banana Roll Cake <Choco Banana>
- Tokyo Banana Miitsuketa Gaufrette
- Tokyo Banana Ai to Sachi (new product August 2008)
- Ice Monaka

== Products sold in the past ==
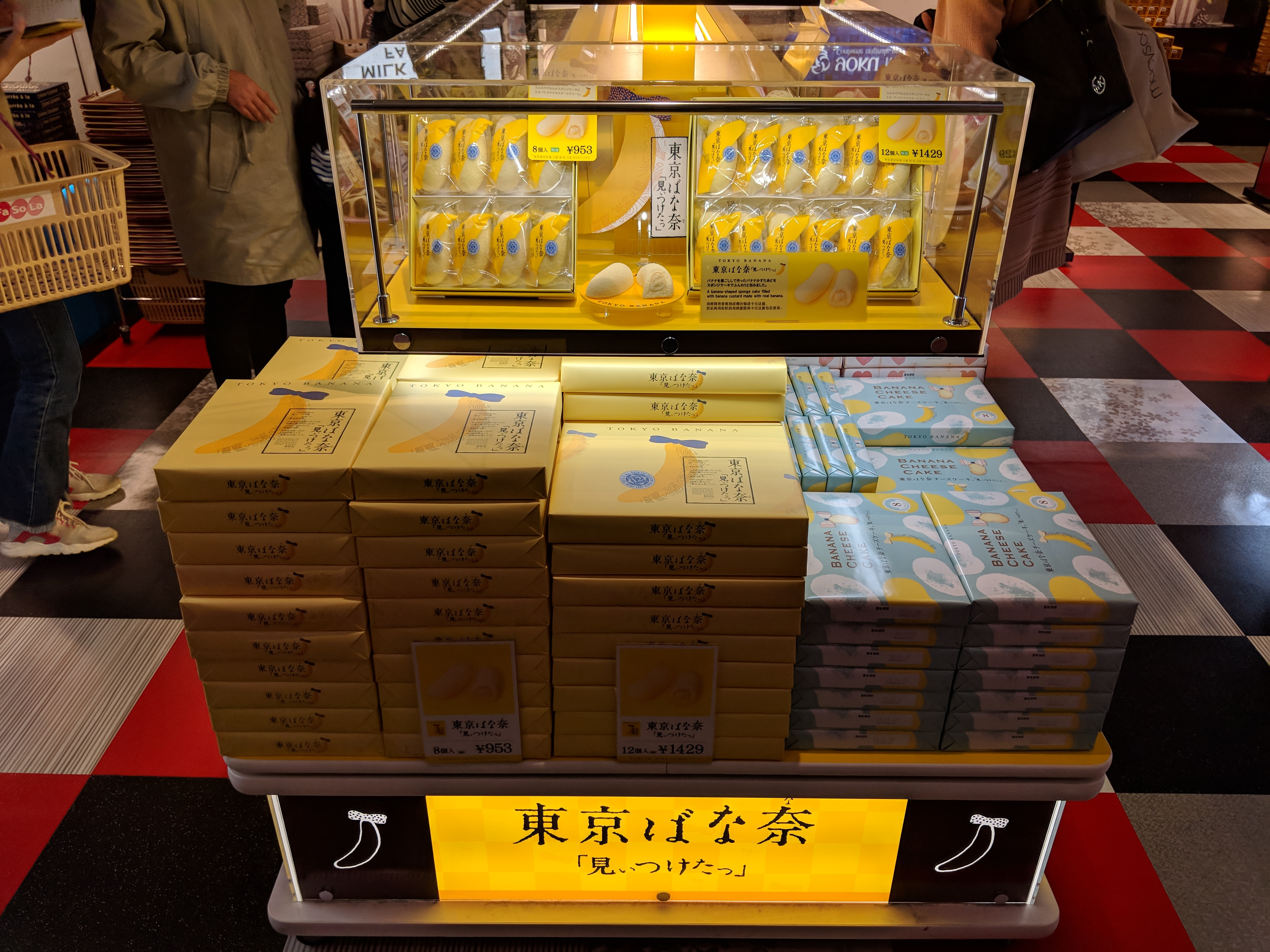
Sold as souvenirs

=== Kuro Bei ===
- Tokyo Banana Kuro Bei (jp:黒ベエ)

Ample banana custard wrapped in a bitter-sweet cocoa sponge cake.

- Chocolate Pie

Chocolate rolled up in cocoa flavoured pastry folded into 328 layers.

- Moist Baumkuchen

Consisting of 2 layers of chocolate banana mixture and muscovado mixture.

- Dorayaki

Japanese dessert consisting of two slices of sponge cake with red bean jam in between

- Black Sesame Seed Pie Kuro Bei
- Kuro Bei Raisin

== See also ==
- List of brand name snack foods
