= Yatsuhashi =

Japanese confection sold in Kyoto

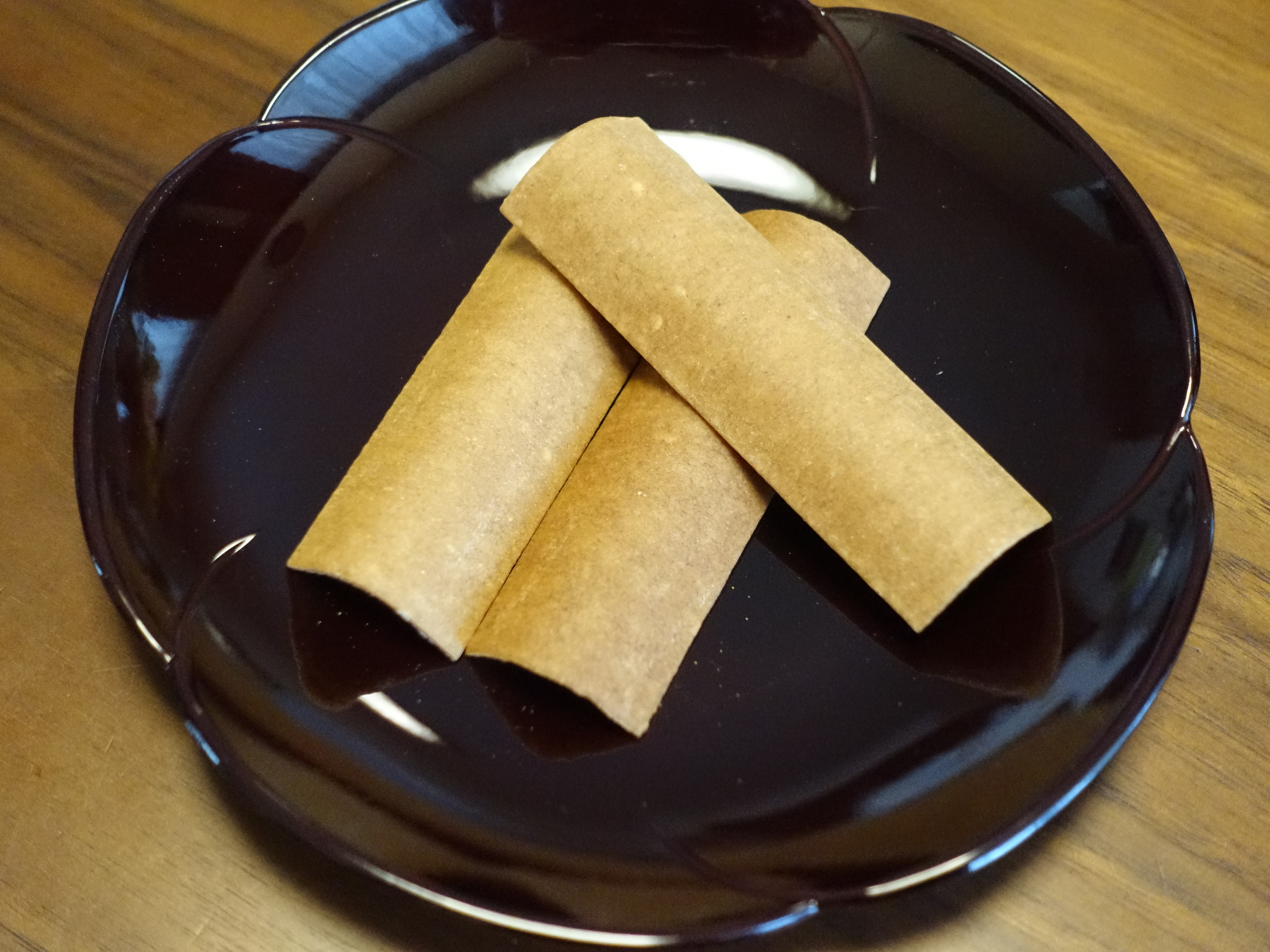
- Yatsuhashi
- Type: Wagashi (miyagegashi)
- Place of origin: Japan
- Region or state: Kyoto
- Main ingredients: Glutinous rice flour, sugar, cinnamon

Yatsuhashi (八ツ橋 or 八橋) is a wagashi (Japanese confection) sold mainly as a miyagegashi (souvenir snack). It is one of the best known meibutsu (famous regional products) of Kyoto. It is made from glutinous rice flour (上新粉, jōshinko), sugar, and cinnamon. Baked, it is similar to senbei. The shape of the hard crackers resembles a Japanese harp or koto, or a bamboo stalk cut lengthways. Yatsuhashi was created in 1689 during the Genroku era (1688–1704) or in 1805 during the Bunka era (1804–1818) in the Edo period (1603–1868). The name Yatsuhashi is believed to come from either a scene in The Tales of Ise or from the musician Yatsuhashi Kengyo. Yatsuhashi is a popular souvenir today, and according to a survey conducted by the city of Kyoto in 2022, 89.2% of Japanese tourists visiting Kyoto bought souvenirs, of which 10.7% bought yatsuhashi.

Raw, unbaked nama yatsuhashi (生八ツ橋) has a soft, mochi-like texture and is often eaten wrapped around red bean paste (餡, an). The unbaked yatsuhashi (Nama yatsuhashi) is cut into a square shape after being rolled very thin, and folded in half diagonally to make a triangle shape, with the red bean paste inside. Unbaked yatsuhashi may also come in a variety of different flavours. Popular flavours include cinnamon and matcha. Yatsutashi is also rolled into a rectangular shape and steamed. Nama yatsuhashi, created in 1960, is a very popular souvenir of Kyoto. According to a survey conducted by the City of Kyoto in 2022, 89.2% of Japanese tourists who visited Kyoto bought souvenirs, of which 31.6% bought Nama yatsuhashi.

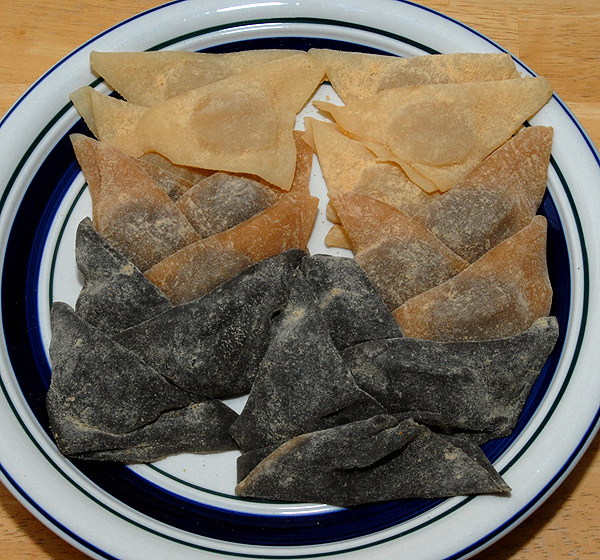
Assorted nama yatsuhashi; flavors, from top to bottom: tofu, cinnamon, sesame

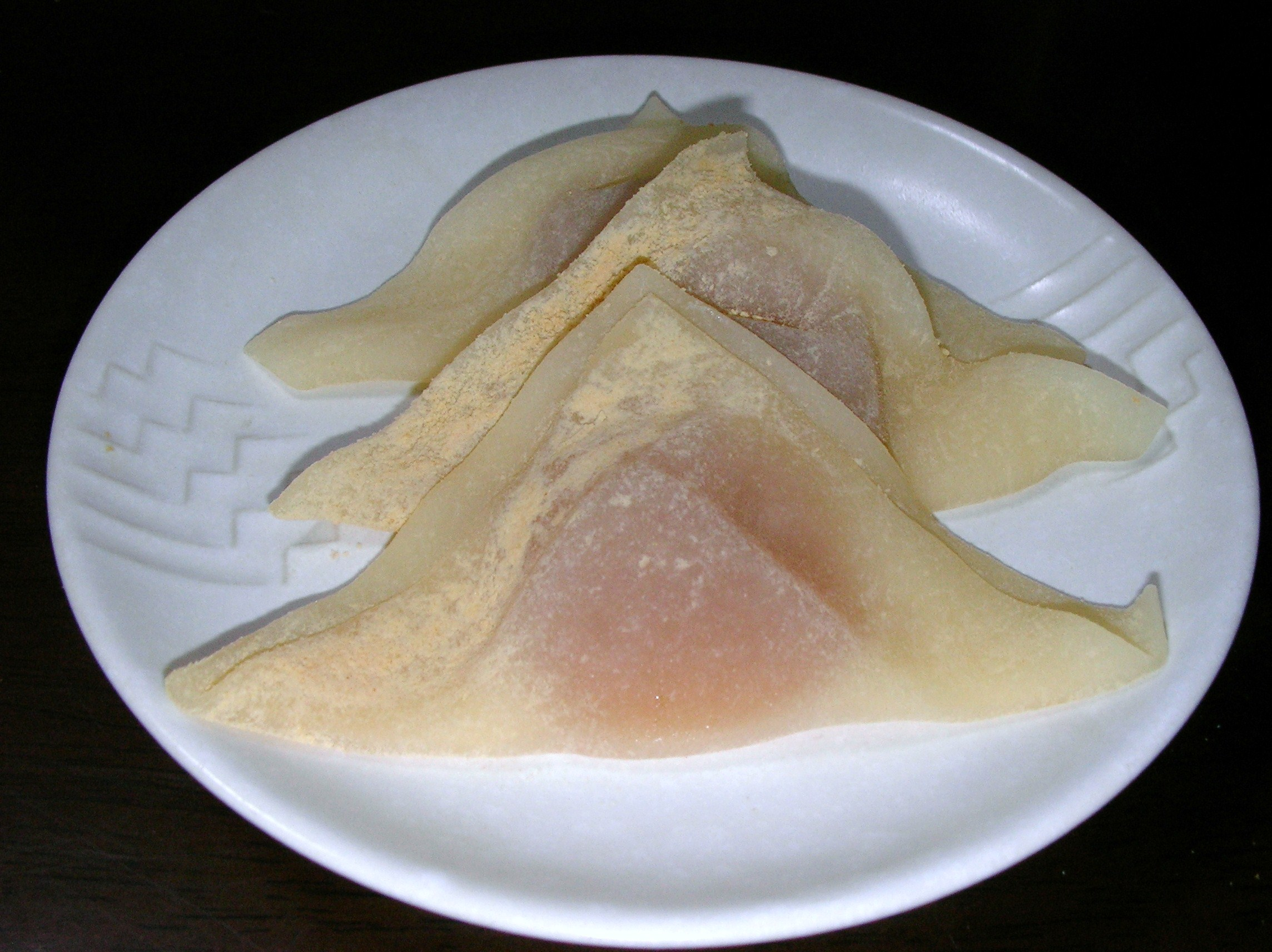
Nama yatsuhashi with white peach paste

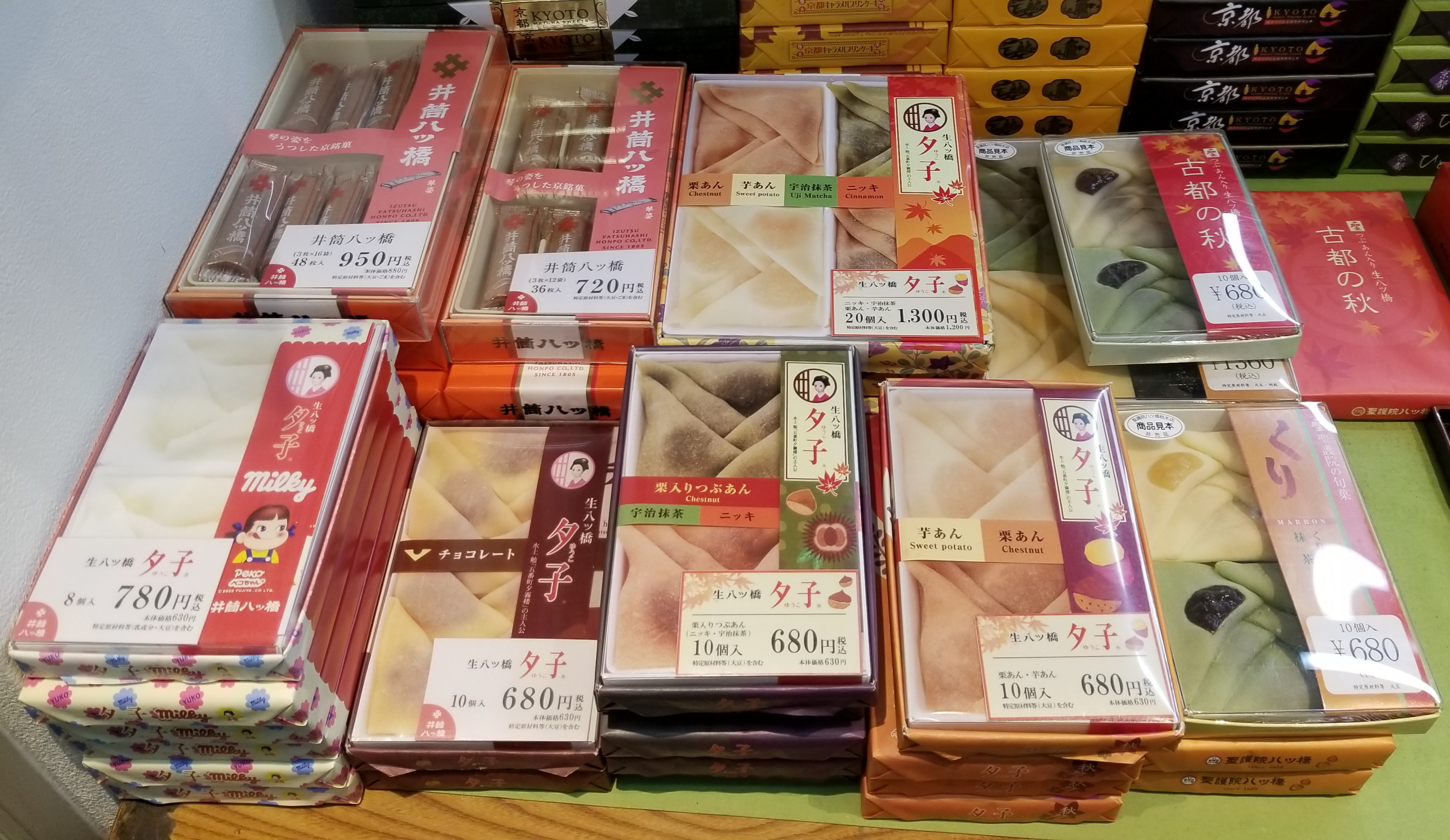
Nama yatsuhashi for sale in Sakuranocho, Nakagyo Ward, Kyoto
