= Mamador =

Japanese confection

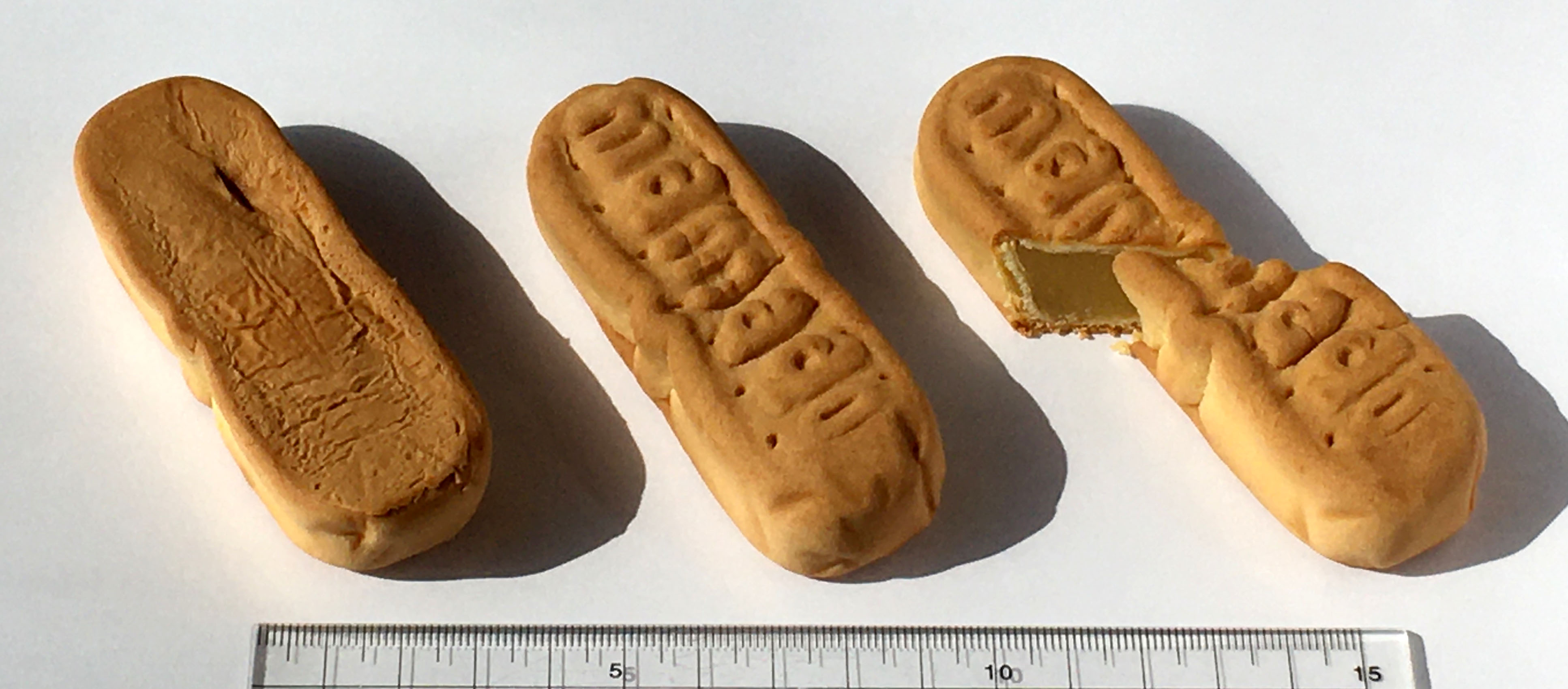
Pieces of the cake-like Japanese sweet dish called Mamadoru

Mamador (ままどおる, Mamadooru) is a cake-like Japanese sweet from Fukushima.

== History ==
Mamador sold from 1967 in Sanmangoku. Chocolate Mamador also available for a limited time, from October to June. In 2018, Mamador price rose from 80 yen to 100 yen because of rising wheat prices.

Mamadors are cake-like and have an azuki bean filling.

== See also ==
- Miyagegashi
- Usukawa Manju
- List of Japanese dessert and sweets
