= Momiji manjū =

Japanese dessert

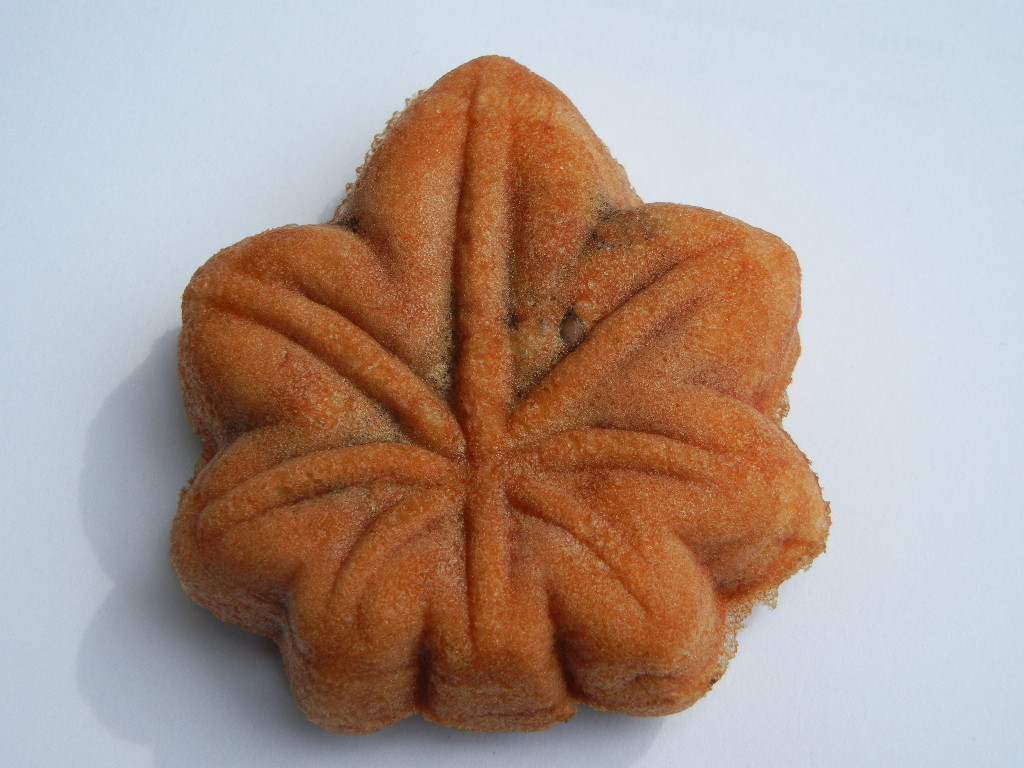
- Momiji Manjū
- Type: Manjū
- Place of origin: Japan
- Region or state: Itsukushima
- Created by: A Wagashi craftsman
- Invented: Late Meiji period
- Main ingredients: Buckwheat and rice
- Ingredients generally used: Red bean paste

Momiji manjū (もみじ饅頭) is a type of wagashi that is baked. The confection is a buckwheat and rice cake shaped like a Japanese maple leaf, and is a local specialty on the island of Itsukushima (Miyajima) in Hiroshima. It is typically filled with red bean paste.

== Overview ==
Momiji manjū is a local specialty and souvenir in Itsukushima, one of Japan's three scenic views. Today, Momiji manjū is known not only for Miyajima's souvenirs but also Hiroshima Prefecture’s miyagegashi nationwide.

Momiji manjū was invented by a wagashi craftsman in the late Meiji period.

== See also ==
- List of Japanese desserts and sweets
- Miyagegashi
- Meibutsu
- Tokusanhin
