= Chinsukō =

Okinawan biscuit

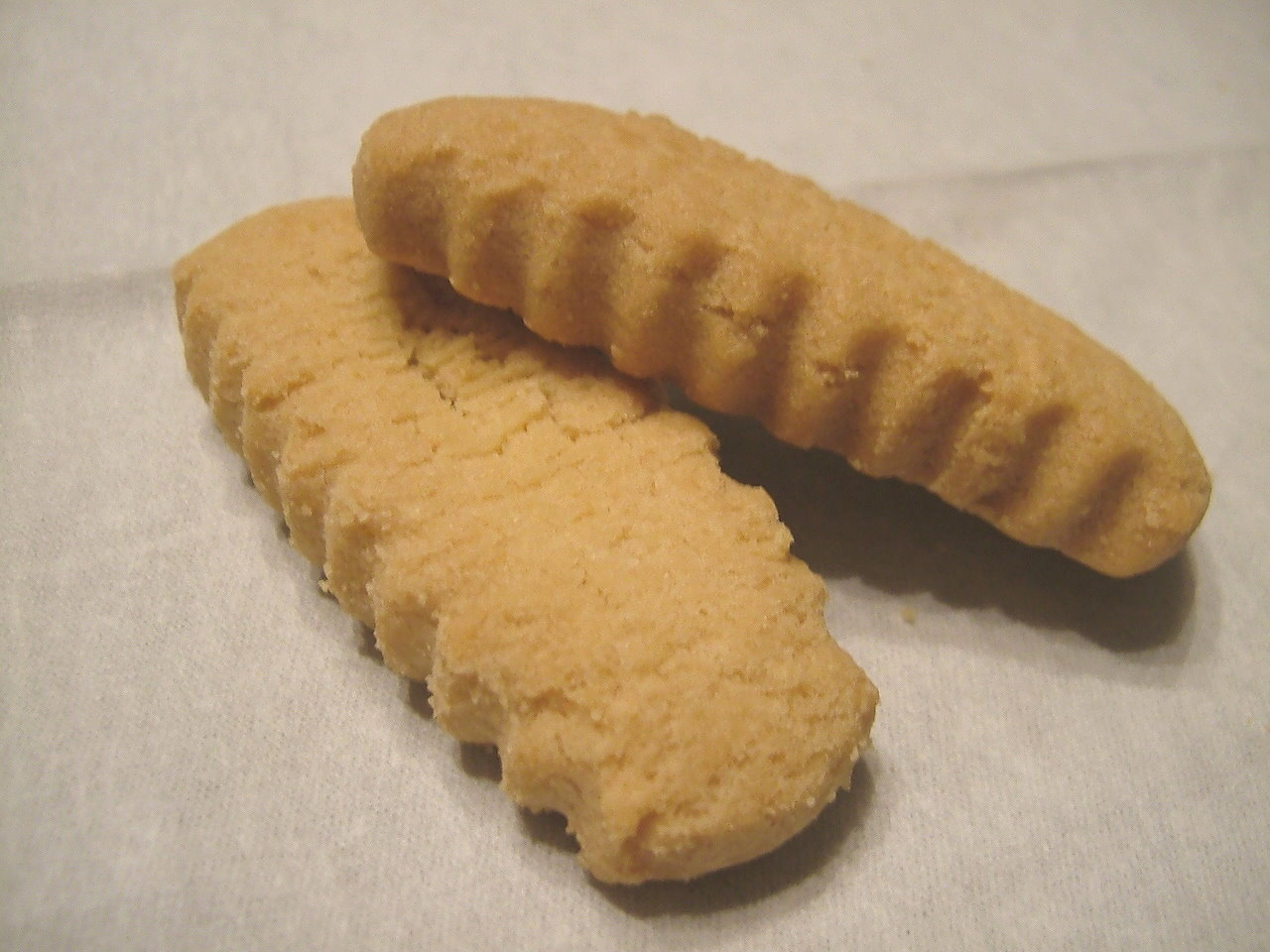
- Type: Confectionery/Biscuit
- Place of origin: China, Japan
- Region or state: Okinawa
- Main ingredients: Lard, Flour, Sugar

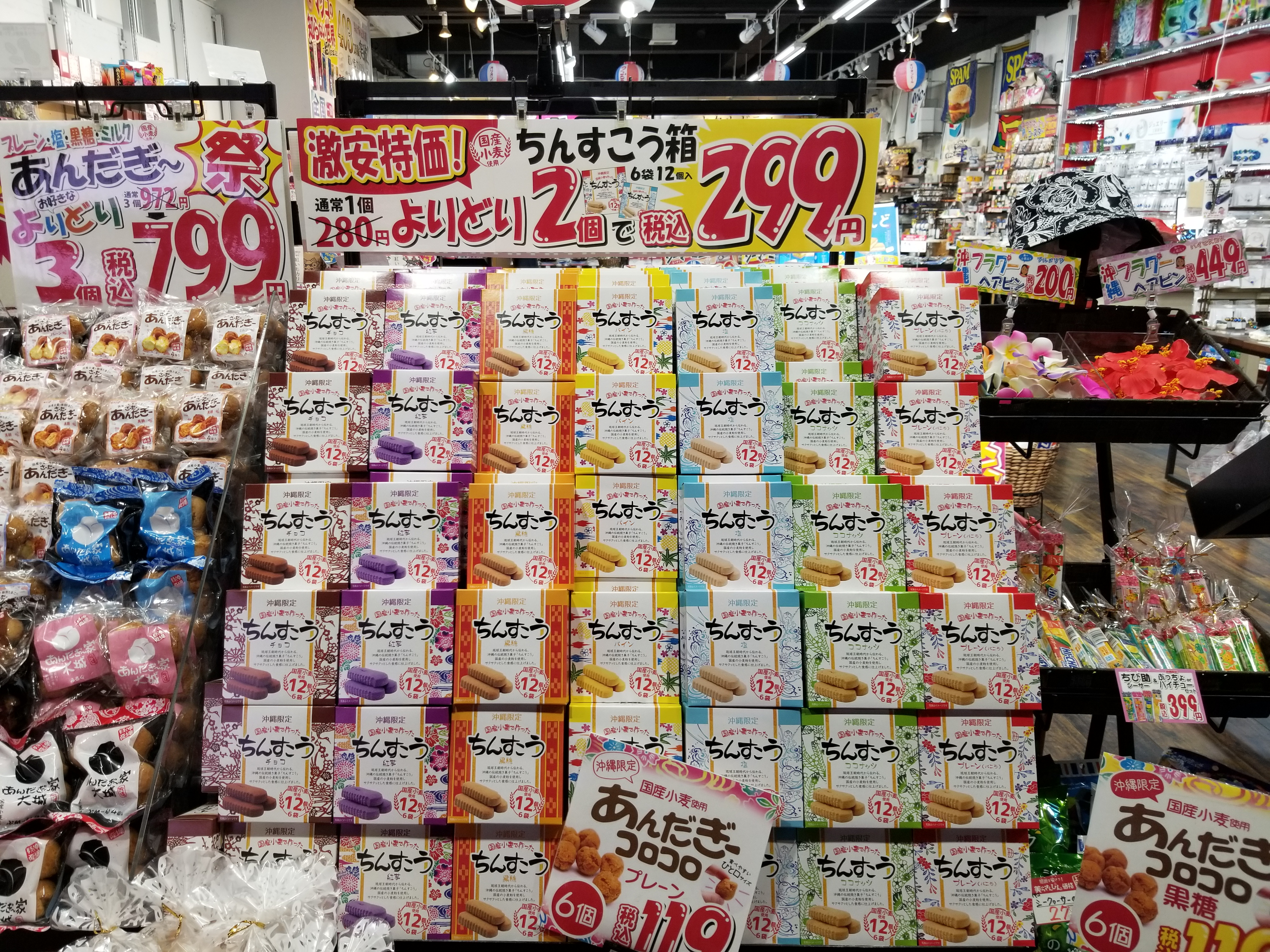
Chinsukō for sale in Naha, Okinawa

Chinsukō (Japanese: 金楚糕(ちんすこう)) is a traditional sweet made in Okinawa since the times of the Ryukyu Kingdom, and often sold as a souvenir (miyagegashi). It is a small biscuit made of mostly lard and flour, with a mild and sweet flavor similar to shortbread.

== Origin ==
The precise origin of Chinsuko is unclear, but multiple baked confections of the time are seen as possible candidates of inspiration. Taosu (桃酥) is a Chinese flour-based cookie that is very similar to Chinsuko. Castella, a sponge cake variant brought over by Portuguese merchants which was adopted into both Chinese and Japanese cuisine is another contender. Spanish Polvorón has much in common with Chinsuko in terms of texture as well as ingredients. Another theory has Chinsuko as the result of attempts to replicate Portuguese bolo as brought over by the Silk Road using materials available in Okinawa.
