= Royce' =

Japanese chocolate manufacturing company

Royce' Confect Co., Ltd. 株式会社ロイズコンフェクト

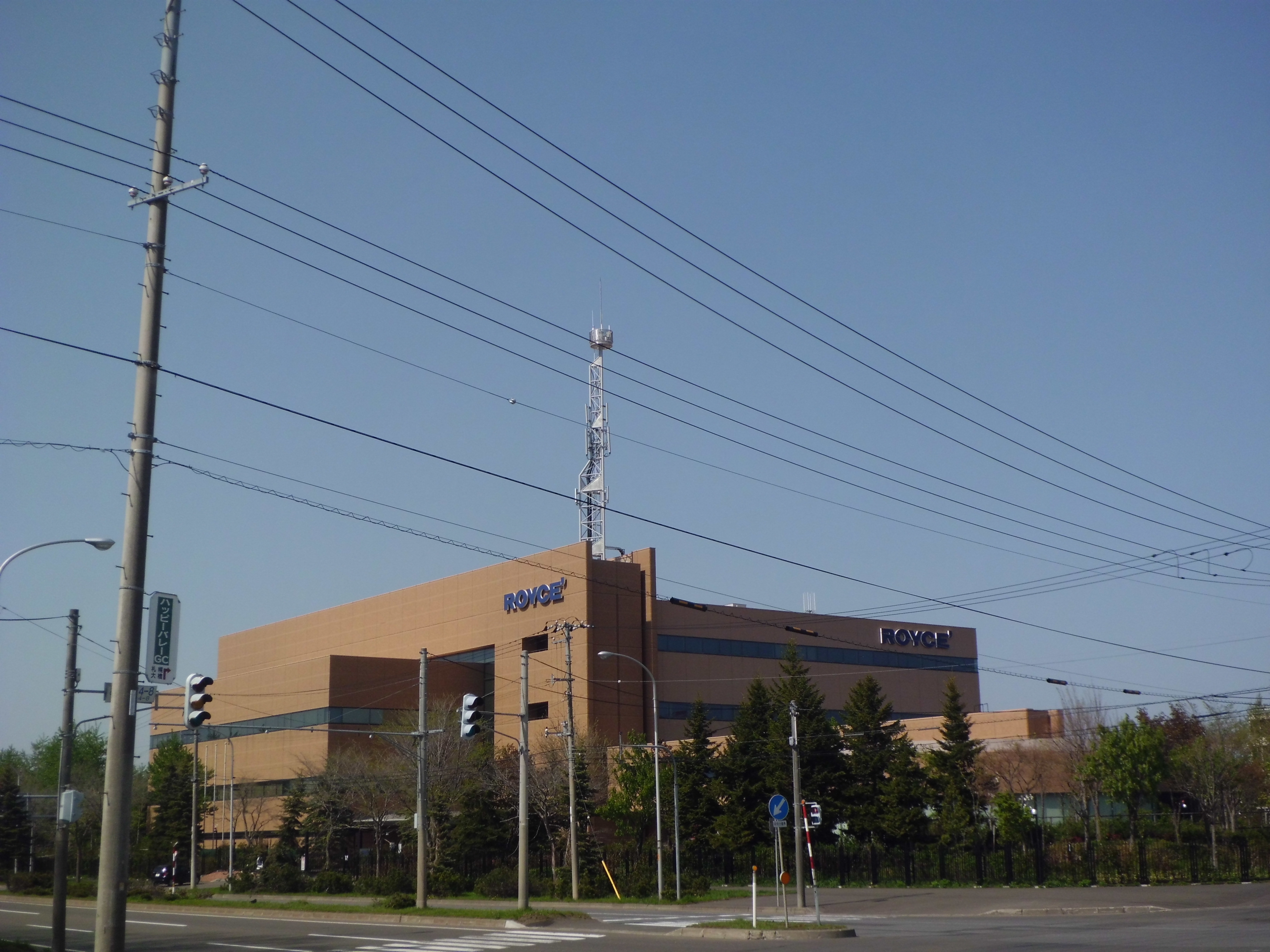
- Type: Private K.K.
- Industry: Foods
- Founded: July 1983; 43 years ago
- Headquarters: Sapporo, Japan
- Key people: Yasuhiro Yamazaki (President)
- Products: Chocolates
- Number of employees: 700 (2009)
- Website: www.royce.com

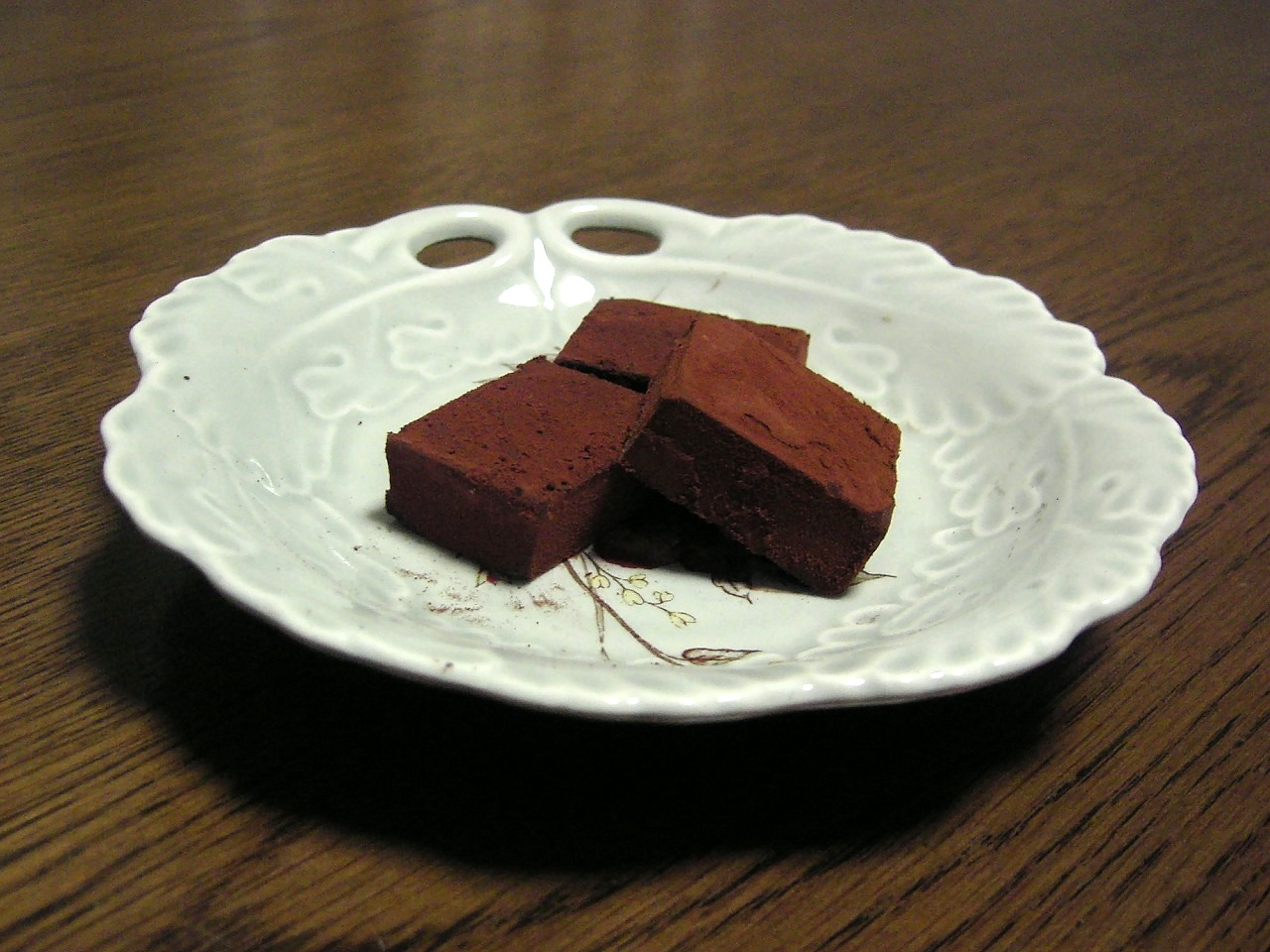
Royce' chocolate.

Royce' Confect Co., Ltd. (株式会社ロイズコンフェクト, Kabushiki-gaisha Roizu Konfekuto), stylized as ROYCE', is a Japanese chocolate manufacturing company. The company is best known for its "Nama Chocolate" (生チョコレート), a form of ganache made with melted cacao and fresh cream, and dusted with fine cocoa powder.

== History ==
Royce' was established in July 1983, with a total capital of ¥10.0 million. Royce's first head office building was located in Hokkaidō, about 500 miles north of Tokyo. By November of that year, Royce' began to produce their first chocolates. The company's first two years saw rather slow growth as it integrated into the Japanese economy. In September 1985, Royce's capital had increased to ¥30.5 million, and it introduced their first mass produced chocolate, a chocolate bar. In September 1989, Royce' was finally able to add a chocolate molding line, allowing the company to further compete with other market brands.

It was not until the 1990s that Royce' would become a significant player in the Asian candy industry. The company introduced their Pure Chocolate line in 1990. The first Royce' shop was established in May 1993, named the "Higashi Naebo Main Shop". This shop, like others to come, would sell Royce' chocolates, as well as company and area-related souvenirs. Royce' cookie production also began in 1993.

In 1995 Royce' introduced the Nama Chocolate product line, which became a mainstay for the company. Nama chocolate is a form of ganache made with melted cacao and fresh cream, and dusted with fine cocoa powder. The word nama means raw, and nama chocolate is a regulated type of Japanese chocolate.

A delivery center was established in 1996, served by a fleet of semi-trucks that took Royce's products to clients. In March 1997 the company opened a sales shop in downtown Sapporo, establishing its first contact with the city where they are currently headquartered. The Royce' sales shop was established inside a Mitsukoshi department store. In June of the same year, with the Sapporo public already familiar with the Royce' brand, the company moved their headquarters to Sapporo, in the Higashi-ku district. The Truffle chocolate brand was later established, and a new distribution center was inaugurated in November. Royce' began selling its chocolates in Hokkaidō area airports, including Chitose Airport. By June 1998, Royce' had established an internet website. The next month, the company announced that its capital had risen to slightly more than twice the amount from the previous announcement, or to ¥61 million. A new manufacturing facility was inaugurated by Royce', in July 1999, at Futomi. In September of that same year, the company moved its headquarters for the third time, but stayed within Sapporo.

In December 2000, Royce' launched an online store. By that year, the company had begun an advertisement campaign on All Nippon Airways' inflight magazine. By 2002, Royce' also began to sell bakery products.

== Origin of the name ==
The company's name, Royce', is derived from the first name of its founder, Yasuhiro Yamazaki (山崎泰博). First, the four morae were reversed to form ロヒスヤ (rohisuya), which was then transformed to ロヒズヤ (rohizuya) for aesthetic reasons. The founder interpreted ヤ as 屋, which is a common suffix in Japanese shop names, leaving the name ロイズ (roizu). This was respelled in English as ROYCE'S, and simplified to ROYCE'.

== Chocolate products ==
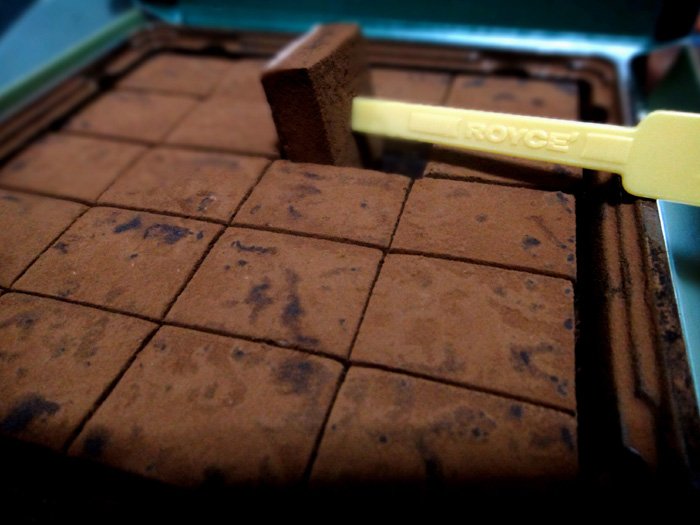
Royce' chocolates

- Dacquoise
- Financier
- Lurumaro Chocola
- Madeleines
- Nama Chocolate
  - The varieties of Nama Chocolate include au lait, mild milk, bitter, white, and matcha.
- Nutty Bar Chocolate
- Petite Truffe
- Royce' Chocolate Bars
- Royce' Pure Chocolate
- Potato Chip Chocolate
  - Chocolate coated potato chips
- Popcorn
- Baton Cookies
- Wafers
- Prafeuille Chocolat
- Criollo Chocolate
- Namachoco Croissant

== Retail ==
Royce' has expanded its retail presence over the years, and as of 2021 has 13 major stores throughout Japan. The company is also well-known for its duty-free shops in airports, with 29 shops in Japanese airports. The company ships from its Japanese production facilities to consumers in Japan.

Royce' has retail shops in 16 countries outside Japan. In the United States, the company has 15 retail outlets, with same-day delivery and pick-up services available at some of their boutique shops using services like Grubhub and Uber Eats. Royce' Confect USA also sells directly to consumers in the continental US through its online store.

In March 2020, the company closed all 9 of its retail locations in South Korea and exited the country. Royce' cited dropping sales as the reason for leaving the South Korean marketplace, fueled by a boycott of Japanese products across the country.

== See also ==
- List of bean-to-bar chocolate manufacturers
