= List of Oishinbo episodes =

Oishinbo a Japanese anime television series based on the manga series of the same name written by Tetsu Kariya and illustrated by Akira Hanasaki. It was broadcast for 136 episodes on Nippon TV and its network affiliates between 17 October 1988 and 17 March 1992. The series was produced by Shin-Ei Animation and directed by Yoshio Takeuchi. For the first 23 episodes the opening theme is YOU and the ending theme is TWO OF US both performed by Megumi Yuki. For the rest of the episodes the opening theme is Dang Dang ki ni naru and the ending theme is Line both performed by Yuma Nakamura. The series was followed by two TV specials that aired in 1992 and 1993.

The series was released on VHS tapes, but it was not until 2016 the series was remastered in high-definition and released on Blu-ray. Subsequently, the series was released on streaming platforms in Japan like Amazon Prime and Netflix. However some episodes are not included in the streamed version of the series.

In October 2020 the series started streaming on YouTube with English subtitles.

== Television series ==
=== Episode list ===
Japanese episode titles and airdates are taken from The Amazon Japan series page.

No.	Title	Original release date
1	"Ultimate Menu"; Transliteration: "Kyūkyoku no menyū" (究極のメニュー)	October 17, 1988
To commemorate its 100th anniversary of the newspaper Touzai Shimbun, President Ohara announces a plan to publish the "Ultimate Menu". The assignment will be allocated to the reporters with the best taste in food and as a test, the assembled staff must distinguish the difference between three samples of water and tofu. Yamaoka is badly hung over and arrives late, so instead of carefully sampling, he drinks all the water and eats the tofu. When the results are examined, only Yūko Kurita, who has just completed her reporter training, and Yamaoka have correctly identified the samples, which means that they will be to ones to implement the project. Ohara gathers Japan's most famous gourmands to devise the dishes that will go into the "Ultimate Menu", but Yamaoka insults their pretentious international choices such as foie gras. He spends the following week with fishermen who catch a Monkfish. Yamaoka skillfully removes the liver, washes it in sake and steams it, creating ankimo as the ship returns to port. At the tasting, Ohara declares that the fresh ankimo tastes better than the canned foie gras and dismisses the gourmands.
2	"Father VS Son"; Transliteration: "Shirō tai chichi・Yūzan" (士郎対父・雄山)	October 24, 1988
Ohara decides to start an art section in Touzai and hopes to borrow a Renoir painting from Mantaro Kyogoku. Ohara entertains him at a restaurant in Ginza, but Kyogoku finds the foods substandard and storms out. Ohara then asks Yamaoka and Kurita to find a quality restaurant in Ginza. Yamaoka consults his friend, Tatsu, a homeless trash collector who regularly eats leftovers from Ginza's restaurants, who recommends Okaboshi restaurant which has a new talented young chef. The dinner party arrives and is presented with a meal of rice, miso soup and Tosan-style grilled fish. However, Kyogoku is incredibly impressed with the quality of the simple meal and how they selected food from his province. He asks if Yamaoka is the son of Yūzan Kaibara, but Yamaoka denies it and offers his resignation at Touzai to avoid comparisons with his fastidious father. Kaibara then visits the Touzai office and challenges Yamaoka to a taste test of tempura. Tanimura brings a group of chefs from Ginza, and Yamaoka first assesses them for cleanliness and health. This whittles their numbers down as Kaibara plays a tape of tempura frying, and orders the remainder to raise their hands when they felt something was unusual. Only two chefs respond, and Yamaoka selects the chef whisking the batter better, while Kaibara selects the one who responded to the tape faster. When the tempura is cooked, Yamaoka's chef is revealed to have overcooked his tempura. A devastated Yamaoka rescinds his resignation, promising to work on the Ultimate Menu to defeat his father.
3	"Fresh Vegetables"; Transliteration: "Yasai no sendo" (野菜の鮮度)	October 31, 1988
Yamaoka takes Kurita to the launch of a new department store built by Shuji Itayama, a well known gourmand. Yamaoka tastes the vegetables, but although they look good he finds they lack flavor. Itayama introduces them to his food court, featuring venues run by famous restaurants across Japan. However, Yamaoka regards them with disdain and accuses Itayama of selling stale vegetables and exploiting the restaurants who are forced to use substandard ingredients to cover their high rent. Itayama complains about Yamaoka to Touzai and withdraws his advertising from the paper. To salvage the situation, Yamaoka takes Itayama to a farm where he experiences the taste of fresh vegetables he ate as a child. As a result, Itayama changes his supply system and the store becomes a success by selling fresh produce.
4	"Fresh Fish"; Transliteration: "Ikita sakana" (活きた魚)	November 7, 1988
President Kuroda of Dainichi Electronics invites Ohara and Yamaoka to his recreation facility at Karuizawa for their annual banquet. Kuroda fancies himself as a chef and prepares the food for his guests, which include business clients and selected staff. He begins with a live white trevally from a holding tank which he serves as sashimi to great acclaim for his preparation skills, but a young boy says it does not taste fresh. Kuroda is outraged, however Yamaoka agrees and he offers to supply fresh fish for comparison the next day. Yamaoka takes Kurita to a fish market, where he buys a fresh trevally and has it quickly killed and bled, then packed in ice. That evening he and Kuroda both prepare their sashimi. The diners unanimously declare Yamaoka's dish better and he explains that the fish killed straight from the ocean was in better health and condition than a fish that has been kept alive, starved and stressed, in a tank for over a week. Humbled, Kuroda formally apologizes to the boy and his family, and later gifts them amusement park tickets as compensation.
5	"Thick Soba Broth"; Transliteration: "Soba tsuyu no fukami" (そばツユの深味)	November 14, 1988
Kurita offers to buy Yamaoka a cheap meal, so he takes her to an alley of vendor's stalls where he selects one run by Hanakawa which serves handmade soba noodles. The noodles are perfect, but Yamaoka states that the broth is lacking in flavour. Police arrive to shut down the stall because Hanakawa has no licence, but after police Inspector Nakamatsu tastes the meal, he offers to provide a licence if the broth improves. Hanakawa tries different recipes but is unsuccessful until Yamaoka tricks him into visiting a soba restaurant where he learns their secret broth recipe. Hanakawa uses it in his stall, and when Inspector Nakamatsu visits again, he grants him a licence, however Nakamatsu still expects some improvement in the flavor of the broth.
6	"The Phantom Fish"; Transliteration: "Maboroshi no sakana" (幻の魚)	November 21, 1988
The Touzai staff are invited to the re-opening of Hatsuyama restaurant, famous for traditional Japanese dishes and Yamaoka is ordered to attend. Before the meal, Kaibara also arrives and he insults his son's abilities. During the meal Kaibara and Yamaoka are asked to name their favourite sashimi fish. Kaibara names many fish, by Yamaoka names mackerel, a common fish which spoils easily and can cause food poisoning without vinegar. Kaibara derides Yamaoka's choice but agrees to taste it. Yamaoka travels to Hayama seeking a "phantom mackerel", and goes out on a fishing boat to attempt to catch one. After three days, with the help of a local fisherman, Kurita manages to hook a large one. When it is prepared for the Touzai staff and Kaibara by a sashimi chef, it proves popular and full of flavor. Yamaoka explains that mackerel normally leave Hayama to migrate, but a "ditzy" mackerel occasionally remains and fattens up in the area instead. Kaibara tastes the fish, but then storms out, complaining about the ugly design of the plates. However, a few days later, he sends some of his beautiful handmade plates to the restaurant.
7	"The Magic of Charcoal"; Transliteration: "Sumibi no maryoku" (炭火の魔力)	November 28, 1988
Inspector Nakamatsu seeks Yamaoka's help after Kinzo, a former chef at a famous eel restaurant called Ikada-ya, is arrested for creating a disturbance. He objected to the former owner's young son switching from charcoal to gas for grilling eel for efficiency. Yamaoka and Kurita help Kinzo set up his own temporary restaurant in Itayama's department store food court to compete against Ikada-ya. Kinzo' charcoal grilled eel. Yamaoka then visits Ikada-ya with a bowl from Kinzo as a reference, which the owner agrees has a better smell and is longer lasting. Yamaoka states that because hydrogen gas was being used with oxygen for the fire, this results in increased moisture that robs Ikada-ya's eel's fragrance and causes it to be watery whereas charcoal fires release carbon dioxide, decreasing water vapor made and creating a better product overall. Chastened by this, the new owner promises to return to the old charcoal grills and re-hires Kinzo.
8	"An Odd Dinner Date"; Transliteration: "Settai no myō" (接待の妙)	December 5, 1988
Ohara is seeking donations for the newspaper's African food appeal and approaches President Heikichi Narisawa of Dainichi Oil. Hideo Tanimura and Kurita visit Narisawa at his headquarters which is a run-down building clearly reflecting the miserly attitude of the president. Narisawa agrees to donate if Touzai can provide him with a decent meal. Ohara invites Narisawa to dinner, but the oil baron storms out, objecting to the amount of money squandered on the meal in an expensive restaurant. To rescue the situation, Yamaoka invites his friend Tatsu to take Narisawa on a tour of a food fair in a department store where they indulge on the free delicacies and sake on offer. Narisawa is so impressed by the fact that Touzai spent no money on the food that he makes a very generous donation.
9	"The Heart of Sushi"; Transliteration: "Sushi no kokoro" (寿司の心)	December 12, 1988
Touzai President Ohara takes the Culture Department staff to a renowned sushi restaurant run by Gingorou but Yamaoka criticizes the quality of the preparation. He challenges Gingorou to visit another sushi restaurant to sample the food there. Yamaoka takes the Touzai staff to an obscure restaurant where Gingorou and the owner, Tomi, each prepare sushi with the same ingredients. In a blind taste test, Tomi's sushi is declared the winner much to Gingorou's annoyance. Yamaoka uses a hospital scanner to show the difference between preparations in the compactness of the rice. Tomi is then revealed to be the famous sushi chef, Tomijirou who left his restaurant to find happiness in preparing food for regular customers whom he regards as friends.
10	"The Rules of Cooking"; Transliteration: "Ryōri no rūru" (料理のルール)	December 19, 1988
Le Canard, a famous French Restaurant opens in Ginza and invites selected guests to dinner. Tanimura, Tomii, Yamaoka and Kurita attend, but so does Yūzan Kaibara. Kaibara severely criticizes the fish entree, declaring that Japanese fish cooking style is better. When the main meal of duck is presented, Kaibara criticizes the traditional French sauce, preferring Japanese condiments. However, Yamaoka praises the sauce and accuses Kaibara of being conservative and reactionary. Kaibara challenges the guests to sample traditional Japanese cooking and prepares a series of dishes. When he serves bonito sashimi, Yamaoka asks for mayonnaise and combines it with soy sauce to accompany the fish. Everyone agrees that the unconventional flavors work together and Yamaoka states that he ordinarily wouldn't dare do such a thing out of self-respect for the host's culture, indirectly jabbing Kaibara. Furious at the remark, Kaibara storms out, but a few days later an article by Kaibara is published, praising the cuisine of Le Canard.
11	"The Power of Clay Pots"; Transliteration: "Donabe no chikara" (土鍋の力)	January 9, 1989
Mr. Fukuman, president of Tsurumori Transportation invites the Touzai cultural news team to a special meal. He presents blowfish on a heritage platter and a turtle soup cooked in his solid gold pot, however Yamaoka is unimpressed with the flavour and asserts that he can produce a better soup. The next day, Yamaoka presents everyone with a simple broth cooked in an old clay pot which has been used for making turtle soup for 30 years. The soup is delicious, and Fukuman offers to exchange his golden pot for the old, charred one.
12	"The secret of Stock"; Transliteration: "Dashi no himitsu" (ダシの秘密)	January 16, 1989
President Ohara wants Yamaoka and his father to reconcile so that Kaibara can contribute to the Ultimate Menu but Kaibara flatly refuses. Concurrently, Yamaoka reveals to the other staff that he smashed several of his father's pottery when he excommunicated himself. Ohara arranges for the Touzai Culture Department staff visit the renowned Hanayama restaurant for dinner while he also invites Kaibara dine with him separately. However, Kaibara complains about the quality of the food, especially the fish soup, and orders it to be remade. The Touzai staff learn about the difficult customer, and that a temporary chef has been engaged for the night. Yamaoka offers to help and he prepares a replacement soup stock and fish dish which impresses Kaibara. When Kaibara proceeds to the kitchen to compliment the chef on the meal, he discovers it was prepared by Yamaoka. He insults Ohara and Yamaoka then storms out, dashing Ohara's hopes of reconciliation.
13	"The Value of Labor"; Transliteration: "Tema no kachi" (手間の価値)	January 23, 1989
Kurita, Tabata and Hanamura go to the Yokohama Chinatown to try some Chinese food. To Kurita's surprise, Yamaoka has agreed to join them. They wait in a queue outside a highly-rated restaurant, but once inside, Yamaoka is angered by a rude waitress and they leave without eating. They try another venue, again with a long queue, but this time Yamaoka complains that the food is bad. The chef prepares to attack him, but the owner, Mr Shu, (Note: A Chinese name: Zhōu(周)) intervenes and challenges Yamaoka to come to his house and do better. In the mansion of Mr Shu, he and his wife judge the dongpo cooked by Yamaoka superior to what they serve at the restaurant. Yamaoka blames their slipping standards on the undiscerning Japanese clientele, who blindly follows reviews in the mass media. The chastised chef promises to do better, and dongpo becomes one of the dishes to be added to the Ultimate menu.
14	"The Champion's Favourite Food"; Transliteration: "Yokozuna no kōbutsu" (横綱の好物)	January 30, 1989
Ohara takes Kurita and Yamaoka to the Takayama sumo wrestling school where they sample the special stew, and are surprised when Kaibara also appears. Ohara will be hosting the school's pep rally, hosting the champion, Wakayoshiba, who requests a fish stew for the meal. On Ohara's recommendation, they decide on yellowtail as the fish to use. However, Yamaoka realizes that the fish is not in season which could embarrass his boss, much to Kaibara's delight. Yamaoka and Kurita fly to Hakata where he convinces Otsuka, the owner of a sumo tea-house there, to let him have a giant fresh saw-edged perch. As a fan of Wakayoshiba, Otsuka offers to travel to Tokyo and prepare it himself. He dramatically prepares the huge fish before the admiring guests. The dinner is a huge success and Yamaoka rescues Ohara from what could have been a very difficult situation.
15 (Note: Not included in streamed versions)	"Japanese Curry"; Transliteration: "Nihon-fū karē" (日本風カレー)	February 6, 1989
Gentarou Torasawa, an elderly judo master stops a purse-snatcher from stealing Kurita's money. He takes her with her two friends and Yamaoka to a Japanese curry restaurant run by his granddaughter Asae and her husband Kitao Tochikawa. Torasawa requested a curry without meat, and Kitao made one with sea perch but Torasawa declares that it is inedible. Yamaoka agrees that it is sub-standard because the fish is low in fat causing a lack of flavor. Torasawa storms out, taking Asae with him. Kitao explains that he was a going to represent Japan in judo at the Olympics but was injured and had to withdraw, opening a restaurant instead. Later, quite by chance, Yamaoka has the idea to incorporate bone marrow into the curry and it is successful, winning Torasawa's approval.
16	"The Power of Open Flames"; Transliteration: "Chokubi no iryoku" (直火の威力)	February 13, 1989
Kurita and Yamaoka travel to Yokohama to work on the Ultimate Menu. They are invited to visit Shu, whose wife asks for their help. Her daughter, Mei-Mei, fell in love with their cook, Wang Xiaolong. They ran away and opened a small Chinese restaurant which has proved very popular. To achieve recognition from the Chinese community and be able to borrow money to establish his own restaurant, Wang will have to prove his culinary skills. He prepares a meal for the Chinese community leaders, but his fried rice fails to meet the standard they expect, and the loan is refused. Yamaoka intercedes and asks for a second chance. He shows Wang how to confidently control the flame and his second effort is successful. Shu and the other community leaders lend him the money he needs, and he is welcomed back into the family.
17	"A Hospitable Heart"; Transliteration: "Motenashi no kokoro" (もてなしの心)	February 20, 1989
Tōjin Tōyama, a national treasure and famous potter who taught Kaibara, marries the much younger Ryouko Suzumura. At the wedding, Tōyama asks Yamaoka to teach Ryouko how to cook. Kaibara disparages Yamaoka's culinary skills, and Tōyama proposes a contest between father and son to cook rice and miso soup. The contest takes place, with Tōyama's assistant Motomura preparing for Kaibara. Motomura's offerings are judged to be better and Kaibara explains the difference is the attention to detail and the hospitable heart that is part of the preparation. Yamaoka is devastated, and gives up betting on horse races, at least for a while.
18	"Freshness and Speed"; Transliteration: "Sendo to supīdo" (鮮度とスピード)	February 27, 1989
Yamaoka writes an article for Touzai News claiming bōsōzoku (biker gangs) are cowardly and compensate for it by riding powerful machines. A group of bikers invade the Touzai offices and accuse Yamaoka of misunderstanding their pleasure from riding at high speed. Motomura quits working for Tōyama who decides to throw a farewell party for him. When Yamaoka tastes the less than perfect oysters at the restaurant, he decides to enlist the bikers to take him to the Shima Peninsula to source the best oysters for dinner that night, a 1,100 kilometer round trip. The bikers take him there and arrive back at the restaurant just in time, but they are arrested for speeding. The oysters are a success, but Kaibara still criticizes Yamaoka for grandstanding.
19	"Love and Ice Cream"; Transliteration: "Hyōka to koi" (氷菓と恋)	March 6, 1989
Kurita and her friends take Yamaoka to Roppongi and they come across a very popular ice cream parlor. While waiting in the queue they see police Inspector Nakamatsu ejected for creating a disturbance. When Kurita and Yamaoka question him he confesses that he is in love with an ice cream saleswoman, Utako Mizumori, but her shop is doing poorly. They try her ice cream and find that, although she uses the best ingredients, it tastes thick and heavy. Yamaoka devises a plan to improve her manufacturing technique, getting Nakamatsu to slice the Roppongi ice creams and hers with a samurai sword. Yamaoka shows that the Roppongi ice cream has more aeration, giving a more "melt-in-the-mouth" feeling. She changes her style accordingly and her shop becomes a success.
20	"Expanding Horizons"; Transliteration: "Shokutaku no hirogari" (食卓の広がり)	March 13, 1989
Ex-staff member Nobuko Mayama, formerly Hayashi, visits the Touzai offices. Although in the past she had a crush on Yamaoka, he ignored her and she married Mayama, the owner and President of Oboshi Realty. She reveals to her former co-workers that the marriage is unsatisfactory as her husband only eats a limited diet which he supplements with vitamins. Kurita persuades Yamaoka to help, and they all visit Nobuko at her home. They meet her husband and Yamaoka challenges him to a game of spinning tops, one of his eccentric pastimes, wagering that if he loses, he must have dinner with Yamaoka. They play the game and the husband loses, so he must eat a meal prepared by Yamaoka. Yamaoka has Nobuko help him prepare a meal of tonkatsu using only the best ingredients. The husband resists, explaining that he was raised by a strict tutor and maid who only prepared a limited menu. However, after Yamaoka forces him to honour his agreement, the husband tearfully realizes that a new world of flavour is open to him.
21	"Knife Basics"; Transliteration: "Hōchō no kihon" (包丁の基本)	March 20, 1989
Jeff Larson, an American chef, visits Touzai Chief Tanimura looking find to work as a chef in a Japanese restaurant to improve his skills and he even brings his own knife. Tanimura takes him to the "West Coast" restaurant which has franchises in the United States. The sushi chef skillfully prepares sashimi with great showmanship, but Jeff says the sashimi is below par and Yamaoka agrees. Yamaoka challenges the chef to a chilled perch competition in a week's time. Yamaoka takes Jeff a sushi bar where the chef Oofuji takes Jeff on as an apprentice. He gets Jeff to practice how to properly use a knife by shaving a daikon radish, followed by the secrets of cutting a fish and its preparation. A week later, Jeff wins the competition back at the West Coast restaurant, but graciously also respects the skills of the chef. Yamaoka explained that when the West Coast chef cut his sashimi, he slammed his knife down with too much force and smashed the meat, hurting its texture in the process.
22	"Terms of a Chef"; Transliteration: "Itamae no jōken" (板前の条件)	March 27, 1989
Touzai news holds an Impressionist exhibition and Mantaro Kyogoku loans a Renoir painting. Chief Tanimura takes Mantaro to the Okaboshi restaurant again in gratitude. The talented young chef has his younger brother, Ryouzou, to prepare the next course. They learn that Ryouzou was fired from Kaibara's Gourmet Club after Kaibara criticized his sashimi. When Mantaro asks Ryouzou to prepare the same dish, Ryouzou becomes nervous and goes outside for a while. When he returns, he prepares the meal, but Yamaoka detects that he has smoked a cigarette which has tainted the taste of the fish. Ryouzou quits smoking, and Mantaro and Yamaoka arrange for Ryouzou to secretly prepare food at the Gourmet Club. The subtlety of Ryouzou's first dish so impresses Kaibara that he is reinstated. Kaibara later visits Okaboshi restaurant to assess Ryouzou's brother but finds Ryouzou celebrating with Yamaoka and co. Kaibara then realizes that the dish Ryouzou used likely came from Yamaoka instead.
23	"Flavor of Gyuunabe"; Transliteration: "Gyūnabe no aji" (牛なべの味)	April 10, 1989
Touzai News invites the African Poet Amal Julah and his wife to Japan and takes them to a sukiyaki restaurant in Ueno called Ushimatsu, but they arrive at the wrong Ushimatsu restaurant. The young owner throws them out, and they go to the intended sukiyaki restaurant. However, the flavour of the beef is disappointing, and they overhear Kaibara in the next room criticizing the food as substandard. When they try shabu-shabu instead, he is equally unimpressed. Later, the other chef from the first Ushimatsu, attacks the owner and accuses him of cheating him out of his inheritance. Yamaoka suggests that the young chef make a variation of the famous Rosanjin style sukiyaki, but combined with elements of shabu-shabu. They arrange for Kaibara's chef Nakagawa to invite Kaibara there to try it and Kaibara is impressed by the result. Even though Kaibara detects the hand of Yamaoka in the recipe, he praises the restaurant, making it a success.
24	"Chuka Soba's Life"; Transliteration: "Chūka soba no inochi" (中華そばの命)	April 24, 1989
Kurita is at her high school class reunion, where she meets the twin sisters Mayumi and Masumi who married brothers that ran a ramen restaurant, Ryuryu-ken. They explain that their husbands had a falling out after the magazine Ramen Mania gave the restaurant "three stars" and it came very popular. Eventually Masumi's husband, Hakuryu, (Note: A Chinese name: Báilóng(白龍)) left and opened his own Ryuryu-ken across the street. Kurita asks Yamaoka for help, and although he is in a bad mood because he misses horse race betting, he relents and agrees to help. They go to the offices of Ramen Mania where the editor introduces them to his expert team of ramen researchers. Kurita, Yamaoka and the researchers go to the two Ryuryu-ken restaurants for evaluation but the ramen from both restaurants is deemed unsatisfactory. Yamaoka suggests that Hakuryu cook the noodles made by Koryu (Note: A Chinese name: Hónglóng(紅龍)) and now the ramen is a success. The editor asserts that the restaurant will retain its three stars only if Koryu is the noodle maker and Hakuryu is the cook. The next day, Kurita declares she won big at the horse races and invites everyone at the office to lunch.
25	"Memory of the tongue" Transliteration: "Shita no kioku" (舌の記憶)	May 1, 1989
Kurita, along with her brother and parents, invites her grandmother to a restaurant named Torigen (鳥玄) in Tsukiji. There, they eat mizutaki, (Note: Chicken hot-pot) the favorite food of her grandmother's late husband. The old woman says that the chicken is bad and nothing like in the old days and becomes very upset. After Kurita tells her story at work, Yamaoka takes her to a large poultry farm, where she is horrified at the treatment of the birds and the use of antibiotics. They then visit a small farm, run by an old lady Yamaoka is acquainted with, where the chickens are free-range. Kurita invites her grandmother back to Torigen. This time, she is delighted with the meal, which was cooked by Yamaoka using free-range chicken. The restaurant owner laments that he has to buy chickens from factory farms because of lower prices. Soon afterwards, the Kurita family start raising chickens in their own backyard.
26	"A Reason Not to Eat"; Transliteration: "Tabenai riyū" (食べない理由)	May 8, 1989
Shuji Itayama requests that Yamaoka and Kurita explain the behavior of one of the members of the Ina Gourmet Club. President Inamura just picks out the ingredients of any dish he is served but declines to taste it. Yamaoka and Kurita interview Inamura, who turns out to be a kind man who greatly cares for his wife who is in bad health. Inamura is also very knowledgeable about Japanese and French cuisine. Yamaoka arranges the meeting of the club in a Chinese restaurant. There, he serves a soup called Fó tiào qiáng, a dish noted for its many ingredients and is said to be so delicious that "it makes even Buddha break his vows". To the surprise of the other club members, Inamura consumes the soup eagerly. Kurita says she talked with Inamura's wife and that he had sworn to refrain from eating fine food at restaurants until she had regained her health. Inamura admits this is true and apologizes to his fellow club members.
27	"Battle of the Whales Part 1"; Transliteration: "Gekitō kujira gassen (zenpen)" (激闘鯨合戦(前編))	May 15, 1989
Protests against Japanese whaling are in the news. This gives deputy director Tomii cravings for whale meat so the staff of the Culture Department goes to a whale restaurant in Shibuya. There they coincidentally meet Kyogoku and Kaibara. During their meal, the restaurant is invaded by protestors; among them is Jeff Larson. Kaibara goes on a rant about how the Japanese are unwilling to protect their traditions and storms out. Kurita and Yamaoka take Jeff with them to Osaka to visit the estate of Kyogoku. There they are served sashimi. Jeff praises the taste but gets upset when he realizes it's whale and calls whaling a barbaric practice. Kyogaku claims whale meat is part of Japanese culture and Yamaoka asserts that killing whales is no different from killing other animals. Jeff claims that whales are going extinct, but Yamaoka responds that endangered species are not hunted and that numbers from the IWC show that many whale populations are growing. Jeff says that Mr. Watt, the vice president of an anti-whaling organization, is coming to Tokyo and he will ask him. One day, when Yamaoka arrives at work, Jeff is already there and is very agitated.
28	"Battle of the Whales Part 2"; Transliteration: "Gekitō kujira gassen (kōhen)" (激闘鯨合戦(後編))	May 22, 1989
Mr. Watt told Jeff that whaling wasn't really important, but in order to raise money for the environmental movement it was easy to paint Japan as a barbaric nation who killed endangered species. He also threatened to use US sanctions against Japan unless whaling was banned. Yamaoka speaks to political journalist Matsukawa, who arranges an interview with deputy prime minister Kakumaru. The minister is unhelpful and explains to Kurita and Yamaoka that trade relations are more important than whaling and kicks them out. Later, when Kaibara enters the Gourmet Club he meets Kakumaru who says he is concerned about the whaling issue. Kurita and Yamaoka receive invitations from Kakumaru to a bunraku puppet theater performance where he and Mr Watt will be in the audience. In the reception after the show, the puppet master mentions that the puppets are controlled with wires made from whalebone. Mr. Watt reacts angrily and declares that whales are more important than bunraku. Kakumaru says whalebone could just be imported from the US, which continues whale hunting even when trying to stop Japan. After a loud quarrel, Mr. Watt leaves, but Kakumaru declares his support for continued hunting of whales.
29	"Wisdom during the Trip"; Transliteration: "Tabisaki no chie" (旅先の知恵)	May 29, 1989
Tomii organizes a Touzai News company trip to the Izu Shirakawa onsen, but finds that Akasaka, manager of the rival Teito Shimbun News has also booked his staff in. Touzai are staying in a small guesthouse, but Teito have booked into the new Tropical Hotel which has bought up all the local seafood for its guests. However, Mr Matsu, a local fisherman that Yamaoka befriended, comes to the rescue and suggests hamanabe, a local hotpot with small local fish and a selection of other ingredients. The Touzai staff have a pleasant evening on the beach, while the Teito staff miss their meal because they have to evacuate the hotel due to a fire. The Touzai staff rush to help, and Matsu and Yamaoka rescue the managers, then share their meal with the Teito Shimbun staff. The next morning, Yamaoka takes everyone to Matsu's bamboo forest, where they eat fresh takenoko sashimi.
30	"Elasticity of Udon"; Transliteration: "うどんの腰" (Udon no koshi)	June 5, 1989
Yamaoka and the "Culture Department Flower Trio" enjoy last day of Ozumo and then go to eat at Chikaraya, a traditional udon restaurant, but it appears run down. The noodles are perfect but their meal is interrupted by local gangsters demanding service and who have chased away the local customers with their rude behavior. On their way home, Yamaoka stops Otani, a young sumo, from jumping off a bridge because he has progressed too slowly and the heya have only offered him a position as a chef and chanko cook. The next day Otani appears at the Touzai office, and chief Hideo Tanimura introduces him to Oyama, a judo competitor, then the Manager Maehara of sports division introduces Ouma Ginkichi, a wrestler. Over lunch, the sportsmen reveal that they are retiring, so Yamaoka arranges for them to work at Chikaraya. After they rid the restaurant of its gangster problem, their strength and enthusiasm prove to be the perfect ingredients for making elastic and soft noodles, and the restaurant becomes hugely successful.
31	"Home of the Ayu"; Transliteration: "Ayu no furusato" (鮎のふるさと)	June 12, 1989
Kyogaku suffers a bad fall and has to stay in a hospital for a few days. When Yamaoka comes for a visit, Kyogaku complains about the hospital food so Yamaoka promises to cook him ayu (sweetfish) tempura when he is discharged. Then Kaibara barges into the room and throws doubt on Yamaoka's abilities. To end the confrontation, Kyogaku suggests they both make ayu tempura and he'll judge which one he likes better. Yamaoka is confident in his frying skill, so he just has to find good ingredients, particularly the ayu. After some research, he settles on fish from the upper reaches of the Hozu River. The contest takes place in the residence of Tōyama. First Yamaoka's ayu is served and receives high praise, then Kaibara's. All find them quite similar, except for Kyogaku, when he takes a bite out Kaibara's ayu tempura, tears of joy run down his cheeks and he declares it the best thing he has ever tasted. Kaibara says he picked ayu from the Shimanto River close to Kyogaku's childhood home. He then triumphantly states that cooking is not just about ingredients and skills, but an art that can stir up emotions. Afterwards, a contemplative Yamaoka decides to keep this in mind for the Ultimate Menu.
32	"Hamburger Ingredients"; Transliteration: "Hanbāgā no yōso" (ハンバーガーの要素)	June 19, 1989
A chef working in the Gourmet Club named Uda has decided to quit and open a hamburger restaurant. Kaibara is furious and believes Uda is wasting his training. Head chef Nakagawa and Uda meet with Yamaoka and Uda explains he wants to make food that is appreciated by the masses, not just a small select group of people. Uda, with the help of Yamaoka, opens a street stall, but the customers don't like his hamburgers. Uda is puzzled by this as he used high-quality meat and good condiments. Yamaoka suggests they go to a sushi place. The sushi chef presents them with various types of sushi including a type containing belly-side cut of tuna. (Note: Ootoro: the fattiest and most expensive part of the tuna) However, it does not taste good as the tuna and rice don't complement each other. Uda realizes his mistake. He had not chosen bread that would go well with his burgers. After changing bread, Uda's stall does roaring business. He sends a hamburger to Kaibara and the day before the restaurant opens, Nakagawa arrives with several cases of pickles, implying Kaibara's tacit approval.
33	"Dish Made by the Bride"; Transliteration: "Niizuma no teryōri" (新妻の手料理)	June 26, 1989
As payday approaches, Touzai staff begin eating more often in the staff canteen. Kurita's old college friend, Miyoko Kasada, says that she is divorcing her husband of 3 months because she believes he is seeing another woman. Kurita buys Yamaoka dinner so he will help follow Miyoko's husband after work. They follow him to a "mother's style" eatery where he spends 3 hours before heading home, which he apparently does every day after work. Yamaoka and Kurita visit Miyoko and she offers them her food, all learned from cookbooks and heated in the microwave. Yamaoka explains that he husband prefers home-style cooking, and does not like her exotic meals. He teaches Miyoko how to make a simple home-cooked meal, uzume-meshi (うずめ飯), from fresh ingredients and her husband begins coming home early every evening to eat her meals.
34	"Awabi Zukushi"; Transliteration: "Awabi zukushi" (あわび尽くし)	July 3, 1989
Kyōichi Koizumi, the new editor-in-chief of Touzai News, wants the Culture Department to focus on modern pop culture to appeal to younger readers, and intends to remove Tanimura from his position as director. Both suggestions Yamaoka finds appalling. Koizumi meets with Yamaoka and Kurita in a restaurant and tells them their work on the Ultimate Menu is going too slowly. They are served raw sliced awabi (abalone) which Koizumi says is the only way to eat awabi. Yamoka begs to differ, and takes Koizumi to other restaurants that serve awabi cooked or dried. Yamaoka manages to get Koizumi to join him on a trip to the Shima peninsula the day after, where they eat awabi "steak". Koizumi admits he misjudged the many ways awabi could be cooked. Yamaoka asks Koizumi to reconsider his decision regarding Tanimura, but Koizumi angrily tells him to leave. Later, Tanimura tells the staff of the Culture Division that he will remain director and adds that Koizumi had called Yamaoka an "awabi-like person". Yamaoka takes this as praise, but Tomii suggests Koizumi is implying Yamaoka's one-sided love for Kurita. (Note: The idiom goes: "One-sided love of awabi on the seashore" (磯のあわびの片思い, iso no awabi no kataomoi) refers to the fact that unlike bivalves, the shell of abalone has only one part)
35	"Tonkatsu that I Miss"; Transliteration: "Tonkatsu bojō" (トンカツ慕情)	July 10, 1989
Deputy Director Tomii assigns Yamaoka and Kurita to follow up on correspondence the newspaper has received about food, and their first letter is from Shinichi Satoi, a Japanese who has lived in the United States for 30 years and became a successful businessman. He has returned to Japan, and wants to taste traditional tonkatsu in Shibuya, but has not found one with the flavour he remembers. He tells of when he was a poor student, the Tonkatsu Daio restaurant owners, Mr and Mrs Nakahashi, were kind to him and their tonkatsu was delicious. Yamaoka decides to find the Nakahashis and convinces his reluctant editor that it will make a good news story. He eventually finds them in a retirement village and reunites them with Satoi. Yamaoka prepares high quality pork and other ingredients for Nakahashi to make tonkatsu, and Nakahashi successfully recreates the flavour Satoi remembers. It is revealed that Nakahashi's secret was to coat his pork with lard before battering it to have more juice. In a surprise gesture, Satoi reveals that he bought the establishment for the Nakahashis who decide to come out of retirement to run their new Tonkatsu Daio restaurant.
36	"Soup and Noodles"; Transliteration: "Sūpu to men" (スープと麺)	July 17, 1989
Hoshimura, a reporter in the "Home & Garden" Department, wants to write an article on hiyashi chuka. She goes to a restaurant with Kurita and Yamaoka, where Yamaoka criticizes the food so scathingly that he is only saved from the irate cook by the appearance of Inspector Nakamatsu. Hoshimura has scheduled an interview with a noted gourmet who turns out to be none other than Yūzan Kaibara. Kaibara is gravely insulted that he is expected to talk about such "vulgar dish", but Yamaoka challenges him and claims to be able to make hiyashi chuka he'd find palatable. Yamaoka experiments with various types of noodles but decides the problem lies in poor-quality ingredients. Yamaoka procures some good chicken and flour made from domestically grown wheat, while Nakamatsu acquires Kurobuta pork. They also enlist the help of a Chinese noodle maker in Wang's restaurant. Kaibara seems pleased with the dish, but then goes into the kitchen and produces another serving which everyone present finds better than the first using Chinese soy sauce and vinegar. Kaibara says Yamaoka paid attention to the ingredients but forgot to consider the dish a whole. While hiyashi chuka was developed in Japan it's based on Chinese cuisine and Chinese condiments are better suited to it. One day, the Touzai staff notice Kaibara is on television claiming hiyashi chuka is a proper Chinese dish.
37	"Ninniku Power"; Transliteration: "Ninniku pawā" (にんにくパワー)	July 24, 1989
The baseball team Tokyo Gallants are playing in the Tokyo Dome. Gallants' player Nagahara hits a foul ball that flies into the audience and strikes Yamaoka, who ends up hospitalized. Nagahara visits the hospital to apologize and the conversation turns to his performance. The previous year Nagahara had been voted rookie of the year, but this year he has been doing poorly. Nagahara claims that he lacks energy and quickly gets exhausted even though he is eating health foods like garlic. Yamaoka and Kurita take Nagahara to a Korean restaurant where they are served cooked garlic dishes. Yamaoka explains that while garlic restores the body, eating minced raw garlic kills intestinal bacteria and has the reverse effect. The restaurant chef then teaches Nagahara a simple way to make garlic soup. Later, after Nagahara has hit home runs in several games in a row, Tanimura enters the office with a present from Nagahara, tickets to tonight's game. Tanimura says the Sports Department wants an interview but Kurita declines, and says it's a trade secret.
38	"Beer and Edamame"; Transliteration: "Bīru to edamame" (ビールと枝豆)	July 31, 1989
Yamaoka takes a group from Touzai News to a beer hall to experience good beer but he is disappointed by the quality. He is horrified to hear that the best beer pourer, Mr Morisawa, has quit. Yamaoka discovers that the establishment has a new owner and he visits Morisawa to ask the reason why, and he says that he has lost his heart for work. Yamaoka talks to the new owner, Jinno, who explains that Morisawa insulted him by serving him black edamame which he considered rotten. Yamaoka invites Jinno to taste freshly picked and steamed beans and Jinno orders a helicopter to fly to the farm. Jinno picks fresh edamame, but when it is steamed, the beans turn black but taste delicious. Yamaoka explains that they are a special variety and Jinno realizes his mistake, so he reinstates Morisawa and makes him manager of the beer hall.
39	"The Taste at the Hottest Moment"; Transliteration: "Shochū no aji" (暑中の味)	August 14, 1989
The employees of Touzai News are alarmed to learn that an unscrupulous businessman is buying up shares in the company and attempting a takeover. To make things worse, President Ohara is feeling poorly because of stress and the hot weather, and is unable to put up a fight to protect the company. Yamaoka recommends a diet of rice porridge (okayu) but Ohara flatly refuses, and says that kind of food is disgusting. One day, Ohara faints and is taken to a hospital. Yamaoka makes a porridge in the hospital kitchen with rice he acquired in Miyagi prefecture. Ohara reluctantly tries it and is surprised how tasty it is and asks for another serving. Yamaoka explains that to make good porridge, the rice has to be of high quality. It has to be sun-dried and carefully milled, and most importantly, properly stored, as the rice available in the middle of summer is from the previous year's harvest. Ohara regains his appetite and health, and successfully convinces a large shareholder to not sell his shares in the company and so thwarts the takeover attempt.
40	"Midsummer Ice"; Transliteration: "Manatsu no koori" (真夏の氷)	August 21, 1989
The employees in the Culture Department are relaxing on the beach when Tomii tries to show off by eating ten bowls of shaved ice in one sitting. This causes him to collapse and be off work for three days due to an upset stomach. When Tomii returns to the office, Yamaoka and the "Flower Trio" try to cheer him up and invite him out for a drink. First they go to a dance club where Yamaoka orders his whisky "straight" because he doesn't trust the tap water. Later they go to a small and quiet bar. The bar owner, Mr Otsuki, says he is closing the business down because of how hard it is to get good water to mix his drinks. He used to draw water from a well in Koishikawa, but the well became polluted with waste water from a nearby factory and residential buildings. He adds that bottled mineral water is just purified water with minerals added to it. Otsuki then pulls out his precious "souvenir" a chunk of ice from Antarctica, and shaves it into drinking glasses and pours the group whisky "on the rocks". When they leave, Yamaoka remarks that they are losing a treasure.
41	"The Ideal Technique"; Transliteration: "Gikō no kyokuchi" (技巧の極致)	August 28, 1989
The elderly Tōjin Tōyama visits the Touzai offices with his young wife Ryoko, and presents Yamaoka with a large Bizen serving plate. He invites Yamaoka to his 77th birthday will be held at Ryotei Konparu with the food served on plates he has made, but Kaibara will also be attending. At the dinner, one of the guests suggests a chef's competition using tai and to be presented on Tōyama's plates. Yamaoka creates a controversy when he suggests that he, as an amateur, could also enter the competition, but then struggles to think of a better way to prepare the fish than usual. He goes to Akashi where the tai are of high quality and gets inspiration after swimming there and almost drowning. On the evening of the contest, each of the restaurateurs present innovative and delicious tai dishes prepared by their chefs, but Yamaoka surprises everyone by preparing tai himono (鮟肝), prepared only with sea salt from Akashi. His dish impresses everyone except Kaibara who storms out.
42	"Soy and Nigari"; Transliteration: "Daizu to nigari" (大豆とにがり)	September 18, 1989
Director Tanimura invites his subordinates to a rakugo performance by his acquaintance Kairakutei Hasshou. Afterwards, Hasshou joins the Touzai group for dinner at a tofu restaurant. Their meal is disturbed by a loud argument between the chef and a customer, who claims the place doesn't serve proper tofu. Hasshou and Yamaoka side with the customer, who introduces himself as Stan Black, a food researcher from Los Angeles and author of the Book of Tofu. Yamaoka promises to settle the issue. The following morning, the chef, Mr Black and Hasshou meet him in a tofu shop where the soy milk is coagulated with a strong solution of magnesium chloride called nigari. Yamaoka explains that most modern tofu makers use a different method that is quicker and produces more but results in tofu that is smelly and watery. The chef tries the shop's tofu and agrees that it's what proper tofu should be, apologizes to Mr. Black, and considers changing suppliers for the restaurant. One day, the Touzai staff run into Black and Hasshou on the street and learn that Hasshou has taken Black in as his disciple in the art of rakugo.
43	"The Aroma of Aodake"; Transliteration: "Aodake no kaori" (青竹の香り)	September 25, 1989
Yamaoka and the "flower trio" are in Kamakura when they come upon a beautiful bamboo grove and decide to have a picnic. They meet the caretaker who tells them the forest is owned by Bitō, an owner of a chain of hotels, who intends to cut it down to build a villa. When Mr Bitō shows up, Yamaoka tells him off and says that a bamboo forest like this is more valuable than any building, but Bitō just scoffs at him. Back in Tokyo, Yamaoka asks president Ohara for a favor. Ohara invites Bitō and Itayama to dinner where the theme is Japanese sea bass. The first dish is sea bass cooked in rice paper, the second is French-style quenelle and the third looks like normal baked fish but the three men are amazed how savory and fragrant it is and declare it the far best of the dishes. The cook of the third dish is Mr Shu. He used a Chinese method where the fish is baked inside a tube of green bamboo (aodake). Mr Shu apologizes for taking bamboo from Bitō's forest without permission, but says it's hard to find good bamboo these days. Next when Yamaoka is in Kamakura, he learns that Bitō has decided to spare the forest.
44	"The Beauty of Women"; Transliteration: "Onna no hana" (女の華)	October 17, 1989
Yamaoka's friend Shoichi Kitao takes him and Kurita to the Tsukiji fish market in the early hours of the morning which is alive with activity. They overhear an argument where the sushi restaurant owner Ms. Natsuko claims the fish provided by the merchant Mr. Uosata was unfit to eat. She maintains that female sushi chefs like her are looked down upon by society. When a famous kabuki actor visiting her restaurant says that women cannot make nigiri sushi, but his male companion and onnagata (Note: Japanese: 女形・女方, "woman-role") Onnagata are male actors who play female roles in Japanese Kabuki theatre.) criticizes his attitude. However, the onnagata also chastises Natsuko for not creating a welcoming atmosphere in which to enjoy the sushi because she is too concerned about being compared with male chefs. Yamaoka invites Kitao and Natsuko to dinner and Natsuko is surprised to find the chef and owner is a woman. In contrast, the owner works collaboratively with her male peers as an equal instead of feeling pressured to compete against them. The experience shocks Natsuko and she completely revises her approach into successfully making sushi with a beauty and elegance that a man could not match. It is later revealed that Natsuko and Kitao were engaged afterwards.
45	"Showdown in Hong Kong Part 1"; Transliteration: "Honkon aji shōbu (zenpen)" (香港味勝負(前編))	October 24, 1989
As representatives of Touzai News, Yamaoka, Kurita and Tomii have been invited to Hong Kong to attend the premiere of the newest Dragon Lee movie. The evening before the event, they are invited to a banquet hosted by Mr. En (Note: Yuen in Cantonese) the president of the film's production company and noted food connoisseur. Their table companion, Fuyumoto from Teito News, complains that the food is inadequate and acts rudely towards Mr. En. Yamaoka starts arguing back and says Fuyumoto doesn't understand Chinese cuisine. After Fuyumoto leaves in a huff, Mr. En asks for Yamaoka's assistance. En wants to become the next president of the yacht club and use the position to help the many Vietnamese boat people refugees in Hong Kong. Who gets the position is decided by a food competition and En's competitor is Mr. Yō, (Note: Yeung in Cantonese) one of the richest people in Hong Kong. Yō and Fuyumoto happen to be old acquaintances, and Yamaoka agrees to participate as long as there is a battle between him and Fuyumoto.
46	"Showdown in Hong Kong Part 2"; Transliteration: "Honkon aji shōbu (kōhen)" (香港味勝負(後編))	October 31, 1989
After watching the Dragon Lee movie, the Touzai trio goes the Lei Yue Mun fishmarket. Just outside the market Tomii notices two refugee children trying to sell their catch. He feels sorry for them and buys an entire bucket of crabs. Yamaoka asks the children to find nuoc mam sauce for him. That evening the competition starts. The first two dishes are based around swallow's nest and shark fin soup and are adjudicated as a draw. The main ingredient in the third dish is an expensive fish called Humpback grouper. However, Yō had bought all the high-quality large fishes on the market. Yamaoka remembers a Japanese dish using a related fish called Ara. He prepares a dish using only the eyes and lips of the fish and the authentic Vietnamese nuoc mam, provided by the children, as a dipping sauce. The dish goes so well down among the yacht club members that Yō concedes the competition and says he shouldn't have allowed the Japanese to compete. Fuyumoto apologizes to Mr. En for his rudeness the previous evening. Back in Tokyo, the office ladies are unimpressed when Tomii and Yamaoka try to reenact Kung-fu fights from the movie.
47	"Egg Yolk and White"; Transliteration: "Kimi to shiromi" (黄身と白身)	November 7, 1989
Mr Black, the American rakugo disciple, visits the Touzai offices for information on the Japanese fried egg. He is looking for the Japanese words for "sunny side up" and "turned-over" for an International Fried Egg Conference (IFEC) to be held in Japan. His question provokes a discussion among the office workers about the best way to eat fried eggs, and each person Yamaoka and Kurita speak to has a different opinion. At the conference, there is intense discussion about the cooking and eating of fried eggs, and Yamaoka demonstrates a way of cooking without turning the egg over. The discussion then turns to seasoning, but at the conclusion of the conference, there is no consensus on what constitutes a prefect fried egg.
48	"Mother's Ringo (Apple)"; Transliteration: "母なるリンゴ" (Hahanaru ringo)	November 14, 1989
Minako, Kurita's old classmate, introduces Yamaoka and Kurita to her fiancé, art dealer Satoru Aosawa, for an article in Touzai News. They all dine out together and Satoru orders apple tea and apple pie at a café, but then loudly complains that they lack flavor. Minako explains that he always orders the same combination but is never satisfied with the taste. Satoru reveals that as a child, his mother left with his younger brother and he has been bitter ever since. He announces that he has decided to break off the engagement to Minako as he no longer wants a family. Weeks later, Satoru's mother in the United States visits Japan after reading Kurita's article about his gallery, and makes contact with her. She explains that following her divorce, she could only take one son and wants to apologize to Satoru, but he refuses to see her. Yamaoka convinces his mother to make apple tea and apple pie and arranges for Satoru to taste them in a tea house. They are made from an older style apple that is more sour than common apples and it is the taste Satoru remembers. Satoru still refuses to speak to his mother, but Minako convinces him that he has really been missing her for 20 years. He relents and they are reunited.
49	"The Power of Gyuniku (Beef)"; Transliteration: "牛肉の力" (Gyūniku no chikara)	November 21, 1989
Ayoyama, a reporter for Number One Sports magazine, is writing an article on the diet of baseball players and Yamaoka and Kurita are assigned to assist him. Meanwhile, the owner of a major baseball team invites Kaibara to the opening of his new beef restaurant, where Kaibara wants to try Miyazakigyu. The reporters visit two baseball camps where the ryokan are supposed to provide a balanced diet, but the players prefer eating gyuniku (Note: Japanese Beef Teriyaki) and yakiniku and are also allowed soft drinks and snacks. The Number One Sports editor in chief invites Yamaoka to report his findings to the owner at his restaurant however when they arrive, they find Kaibara dining with him. When the group taste the meat, Yamaoka and Kaibara are critical and Yamaoka gives the reasons why the meat has little flavor. Then next day, they all visit the farm, and Kaibara asks Yamaoka to choose which calf (子牛, koushi) is will produce the best beef. Yamaoka chooses one but is criticized by Kaibara as the calves are all male and castrated, whereas he says the best beef comes from cows who have not yet given birth. Yamaoka is devastated by his mistake, however Ayoyama publishes the article based on their research which is well-received.
50	"The Ultimate Manners"; Transliteration: "Kyūkyoku no sahō" (究極の作法)	November 28, 1989
Branch Manager Tokiyama of Touzai News Paris has become the new foreign news editor back in Japan and the Culture Department staff take him to dinner. He is upset because his daughter Etsuko and her and grandfather had a big argument over the use of chopsticks which she regards as barbaric. Kurita offers to meet and talk to her along with Yamaoka, but Kaibara overhears and accuses Yamaoka of being the last person to teach the manners of Japanese cuisine. Yamaoka takes Etsuko to visit a teak chopstick factory, where she sees the craftsmanship involved. Later, they use the cedar chopsticks at an exclusive ryotei in Kyoto, but Kaibara also arrives as an invited guest. They enjoy eating their meal with chopsticks, but Kaibara insults Yamaoka's manners for wetting too much of the end of the chopsticks while eating in what he considers a display of poor manners.
51	"Lemons and Health"; Transliteration: "Remon to kenkō" (レモンと健康)	December 5, 1989
A photographer named Seisaku Arakawa has taken a liking to Kinue Tabata and invites her to his exhibition. He then invites the Culture Department staff on a hike in the Tanzawa Mountains the following Sunday. During the hike, the Touzai employees have a hard time keeping up with Arakawa so Tabata, Hanamura and Kurita decide they must get in shape. After Deputy director Tomii reads an article about how men who are disliked by their female co-workers are not promoted, he invites the "Flower Trio" to lunch but they repeatedly decline. Tomii becomes distressed, but it is revealed the women have been using their lunch breaks to go jogging. Yamaoka considers this a bad idea, both because of the car pollution in central Tokyo and because they use lemons to refresh themselves during the run. He points out the lemons are imported and have been treated with harmful preservatives like TBZ. Arakawa returns, and presents Tabata with a picture he took of her working at the office. Yamaoka dislikes the picture because in the background he is clearly seen sleeping at his desk.
52	"The Charm of Fish"; Transliteration: "Sakana no daigomi" (魚の醍醐味)	December 12, 1989
The wealthy Mr Kyogoku visits Tokyo and invites Yamaoka and Kurita to a special restaurant for fugu, however Kaibara arrives and immediately insults Yamaoka. The restaurant is unable to serve fugu shirako, disappointing the customers, especially a young couple are about to leave for work in the Middle East. Yamaoka and then Kaibara offer to provide an alternative the following evening at the Gourmet Club. Yamaoka flies to Toyama to buy a fresh Pacific cod (鱈, tara) for the meal and when he arrives, the staff warmly welcome him. Yamaoka presents his tara shirako, both raw and cooked and is highly praised for his effort and the flavor of the food. Kaibara laughs at his attempt and instead presents a torafugu from Simonoseki and the guests praise the taste as being better than the tara shirako. Incensed, Yamaoka proposes another challenge the following day using alternative ingredients. The guests declare that although it looks different, the food tastes as good as the fugu shirako and Yamaoka reveals that it is lamb's brains. Kaibara's offering is veal brain which provides a similar taste, but Kyogoku declares Yamaoka the winner because lamb is more common in the Middle East.
53	"Candy and Dream"; Transliteration: "Okashi to yume" (お菓子と夢)	December 19, 1989
The Tozai staff intervene when the owner of Angel's Dream Patisserie gets into an argument with a former chef, Toshio Sakamura after the latter quits, with the former believing he only worked to steal their recipes. As a result, Toshio also alienates his fiancée Sumiko who is the owner's daughter. After accidentally bumping Yamaoka into a fountain, Toshio joins the staff at Tozai News, and explains that he left as the prices of the store were too exorbitant. Yamaoka and Kurita later visit Sumiko, who is still in shock over Toshio's departure. When the pair explain Toshio's honesty to her, they take her to nursery of Toshio's niece, who had lost her father in a recent traffic accident. As Yamaoka and Kurita planned, Toshio made his regular visit to the school, providing cakes for the children. When Sumiko asks why, Toshio revealed that he examined the snacks the children consumed and found it to be riddled with additives. Once Sumiko realizes his motives, she convinces her father to help Toshio and he provides a van so they can sell cakes without additives directly to customers at a lower price.
54	"Tokyo-style Zoni"; Transliteration: "Edokko zōni" (江戸ッ子雑煮)	January 9, 1990
Yamaoka's elderly acquaintance, Mr. Date the "head of the Edo firemen", is in low spirits and barely leaves his room. He wanted some zōni soup for New Year's Meal but the place where he had always bought kamaboko paste, an essential ingredient, had closed shop and he didn't like the kamaboko from anywhere else. Yamaoka wants to cheer up the old man, but when he tries some commercially available kamaboko he finds them unappealing, as artificial flavors and polyphosphate have been added to the product. Eventually, Yamaoka makes his own kamaboko from scratch using traditional methods. Now Mr. Date can properly celebrate the New Year with "Edokko" zōni. He feels invigorated and few days later participates in the Dezomeshiki, an annual event where modern and Edo period fire-fighting techniques are displayed.
55	"Mystery of Soy Sauce"; Transliteration: "Shōyu no shinpi" (しょう油の神秘)	January 16, 1990
Hanamura and her friend are returning from a ski trip when their car slides off the road and ends up stuck in snow. A passing driver stops and pulls them back onto the road, and before leaving, gives Hanamura a bag of senbei rice crackers. Hanamura tells of her adventure at the office and claims that when she saw her rescuer it was "love at first sight" but the man never told her his name. The office staff thinks the senbei Hanamura brought are uncommonly tasty and Kurita and Tabata suggest finding the store that sells them might help in tracking the man down. However, wherever they look, they can't find a place that sells this kind of senbei. Yamaoka thinks the soy sauce the senbei are flavored with is not mass-produced but made by a small traditional brewery. He contacts a soy sauce maker called Kimura-ya in Gobō. They sold their sauce to a store in Asakusa and when Hanamura goes there, the proprietor, called Mitani, is the man she was looking for.
56	"Yum Cha"; Transliteration: "Yamu cha" (飲茶)	January 23, 1990
Daisaku Hoshimura, the Minister for Foreign Affairs, visits President Ohara at Touzai News. He asks Ohara to arrange an invitation to the Gourmet Club for the Chinese Vice Chairman Chen Yong Liong who is visiting Japan. Ohara pressures Yamaoka to ask his friend Tōyama to provide an invitation, but Kaibara refuses to serve politicians. Yamaoka approaches another Gourmet Club member, Mr Shu who is an old friend of Chen, to invite Kaibara to a special yum cha dinner and he eagerly accepts. Kaibara greatly enjoys the meal, but is surprised to find that the chef is in fact Vice Chairman Chen. Kaibara agrees to invite Chen to the Gourmet Club which is a diplomatic success, although Kaibara suspects that Yamaoka had a hand in the arrangement.
57	"Fond de Veau"; Transliteration: "Fon do vō" (フォン・ド・ヴォー)	January 30, 1990
Noriko Hanamura announces her engagement and invites Yamaoka, Kurita and Tabata to meet her fiance Mitani at Ginza's Gingintei restaurant where they plan to hold the wedding reception. They are impressed with owner-chef Mr Nakazato's meal, especially with the Fond de Veau (veal sauce) but his drunken son Yasuo creates an embarrassing scene. Yamaoka and Kurita discover that Yasuo was fond of Hanamura and was hurt by her engagement to Mitani. A few days later, Mr Nakazato is involved in a car accident, and they try desperately to find an alternative chef. Yasuo offers to cook and tries to sober up and prove his skills. The meal is successful, however the flavor of his veal sauce is lacking which Yamaoka attributes to the type of bones used. They try again, using the ingredients of the first sauce as the base and this time, the result more than meets the approval of the guests.
58	"Music of Hometown"; Transliteration: "Furusato no uta" (ふるさとの唄)	February 6, 1990
Toshio Amano, a shy young part-time student worker at Touzai, is fired because of his difficulty in talking to people. Yamaoka and the "Culture Department Flower Trio" invite him to lunch where Amano explains that he is embarrassed by his Tōhoku accent although he later impresses them with his singing. Yamaoka gets Toshio a job selling roasted sweet potatoes from a street cart but Toshio has trouble attracting customers because he is too shy to call out loudly. Kurita suggests that Toshio sings out in his natural Tōhoku accent which attracts the attention of the neighborhood, making him a success.
59	"Friends of Rice"; Transliteration: "Meshi no tomo" (飯の友)	February 13, 1990
The Touzai Arts and Culture Department staff visit a trade exhibition of California rice, and the economist Ryo Osaki accompanying the Deputy Prime Minister Kakumaru announces the liberalization of the rice import policy. Yamaoka objects, claiming that Japanese rice grown traditionally, tastes different. While preparing for lunch back at the office, the Touzai staff start discussing their favourite rice accompaniments and decide to have a "Friends of Rice" contest. Yamaoka causes a stir because he also invited the Deputy Prime Minister. The tasting competition goes well, with many varied and tasty dishes to accompany the rice. Yamaoka then argues the case for maintaining import restrictions to support the tradition of rice-growing in Japan and Kakumaru decides to reconsider the import liberalization policy.
60	"Effort in Kimchi"; Transliteration: "Kimuchi no kokoro" (キムチの精神(こころ))	February 20, 1990
Touzai proposes to publish a book on Korean culture with the cooperation of Korean publisher. President Kim Changyoung of Saehan Books visits the Touzai offices to discuss the publication, but the emcee Tomio Tomii offends him and he cancels the deal. The staff review the meeting and Yamaoka recalls that Tomii started smoking and drinking before President Kim did, and the kimchi was too spicy. Yamaoka arranges for some kimchi made the Korean way to be sent to President Kim and the tactic is successful. Talks resume, and this time, Tomii displays much more courtesy to the Korean businessman.
61	"Emergency Food"; Transliteration: "Hijōshoku" (非常食)	February 27, 1990
Nobuko Mayama (Note: See episode 20) invites Yamaoka and the "Culture Department Flower Trio" to visit the Mayama mountain villa. After a day skiing, the group eats dinner in the villa and is joined by Mr. Oide, a wealthy hotel owner, and his wife. Mr. Oide appears to be rude and domineering and his behavior makes his wife unhappy. When the group wakes up the next morning, a heavy snowstorm is raging, and they find themselves trapped in the hotel and the phone lines are down. Mr. Mayama then explains that the villa caretakers just cleaned out the pantry so they are out of food, which leads to Mr. Oide angrily blaming him for their predicament. Yamaoka digs up green onions from the garden and the women find some flour and sesame oil. Yamaoka uses these ingredients to make a type of flatbread called Laobing (Chinese Scallion pancakes). The group enjoys the meal and surprisingly, Oide compliments Yamaoka for calmly solving the problem and revises his way of thinking. Meanwhile, the storm has died down.
62	"The Red of the Earth"; Transliteration: "Daichi no Aka" (大地の赤)	March 6, 1990
Yamaoka and Kurita visit Tōjin Tōyama on the day he removes ceramics from his kiln, but he is dissatisfied with many of the pieces and smashes them. He is especially disappointed with a red glaze which he has been trying to match to the colour of tomatoes. While arguing with Yamaoka, he trips and fractures his ankle. In hospital, Kaibara brings some fresh organic vine-ripened tomatoes, however they lack flavour which Yamaoka attributes to using non-organid fertilizer. He offers to take everyone to visit a farm growing vine-ripened tomatoes in the middle of winter. The travel to Kakegawa in Shizuoka where they meet Mr Nagata who uses the "ryokuken" farming method. He uses greenhouses to reproduce the harsh native environment of tomatoes in the Andes mountains. The tomatoes are pronounced delicious, and Tōyama believes that he has found the red colour he was searching for. However Kaibara is publicly unwilling to accept this method of cultivation or that Yamaoka is right.
63	"Natto of Love"; Transliteration: "Ai no nattō" (愛の納豆)	March 13, 1990
Mie Katsuta, Kurita's friend from college, asks Kurita out to dinner to meet her fiancé, Yasuo Kirita. Kurita thinks it would be awkward to turn up alone, so she drags Yamaoka along with her. The newly engaged couple are excessively affectionate, to the degree that Kurita and Yamaoka become irritated, but when Mie suggests that they will eat natto for breakfast every day, they end up in a shouting match and leave the restaurant. Days later, Yasuo shows up at the Touzai offices and asks Yamaoka to help him appreciate natto. Yamaoka takes Yasuo to a restaurant where they prepare natto in a number of different ways and he becomes a convert, saving his relationship with Mie.
64	"Salad and Beauty"; Transliteration: "Sarada to biyō" (サラダと美容)	March 20, 1990
President Ohara of Touzai is asked by an associate, Mr Moriya, to provide a likely marriage prospect for Ms Akiko, one of his relatives. Moriya has already arranged 197 marriages and is aiming for 200. Ohara nominates Yamaoka, and after the introductory dinner, Yamaoka and Akiko discover they were both pressured into attending the meeting. Akiko later reveals that she only eats salads to reduce weight, but it is not working. Akiko's former fiancée and a famous fashion designer, Nakao Hirota, still loves her and he asks Yamaoka to find out why she broke off their engagement. Akiko tells Yamaoka that she broke off her engagement because she had gained weight and felt self-conscious. Yamaoka deduces that her diet consisting of salads only twice a day with rich dressings is unhealthy and he suggests that she eats more high fibre vegetables without any dressing. Yamaoka then explains Akiko's situation to Hirota and he appears later with a wedding dress he designed for Akiko and they are reunited, although she also vows to improve her diet.
65	"Boke and Tsukkomi"; Transliteration: "Boke to tsukkomi" (ぼけとつっこみ)	April 24, 1990
The American rakugoka, Mr. Black, invites Kurita and Yamaoka to one of his performances at a Yose. A star act on the bill is the comedy duo of the tsutkomi Subeta and boke Koronda. Later at dinner, Subeta declares that he is more popular, and during the meal constantly berates Koronda. When a dish of tai roasted fish head (兜焼き, kabuto-yaki) is served, Subeta takes Koronda's portion and suggests that he eat the tail instead. When everyone objects to Subeta's behaviour, he declares that he will become a solo act. After some initial success as a TV show host, Subeta's popularity starts to wane as his crass humour misses its mark. Meanwhile, Koronda has little success using old material without the spark and edge of Subeta. Yamaoka invites Subeta to dinner, and takes him with Kurita and Black, to the countryside where they dine on dojo fish prepared in different ways, including a Kinpira style yanagawa nabe combing the dojos with gobo (burdock root). Everyone enjoys the food, and Yamaoka reminds them that the yanagawa nabe worked because the plain tasting dojos combined with the unappetizing gobo made a delicious dish together. Subeta realizes his mistake and humbly thanks Yamaoka. He then joins Koronda back on stage and they become a popular duo again.
66	"Wankata Test"; Transliteration: "Wankata shiken" (椀方試験)	May 1, 1990
Kaibara enjoys a lunch of subtle complexity which has been prepared by the young chef Ryouzou. Kaibara decides to appoint him as his wankata (bowl chef) if he passes a series of tests. Ryouzou fails the taste test of shimiji sumashijiru (clam broth) and when Ryouzou tells his older brother, who owns the Okaboshi restaurant, Yamaoka offers to help. Ryouzou prepares sumashijiru for Yamaoka who realizes the mistake and he suggests that they go to Shinjiko in Shimane. There, a fisherman takes them out onto the lake to collect the freshwater clams, and he shows the difference between those that live on the soil or sandy lake bottom which causes them to have a different flavor. Ryouzou now knows the difference, and secretly prepares a dish with the sandy bottom clams for Kaibara. Ryouzou passes the test and is appointed wankata.
67	"Boxer's Pain"; Transliteration: "Bokusā no kurushimi" (ボクサーの苦しみ)	May 8, 1990
The Japanese boxer Katsumura loses his bout against the world champion, and Yamaoka suggests to the Touzai staff that it was because he is overweight. The next day, sports photographer Arakawa tells Yamaoka and Kurita that he intended to propose to Tabata when Katsumura won, but now lacks the confidence to do so. Kurita suggests backing Sawaya who is competing for the lightweight world championship. When she and Yamaoka watch him training, they see he lacks fitness because he has a strict diet to keep his weight down. Sawaya says he enjoys eating so Kurita and Arakawa press Yamaoka to find a solution. After dining with Director Koizumi on a vegetable dish at the French restaurant Maquereau, Yamaoka asks the chef Saito to come up with some delicious western vegetable dishes that are high in fiber and low in fat. Sawaya enjoys the mainly vegetarian meal and goes on to win the championship. Arakawa then proposes to Tabata and she accepts.
68	"Tamago and Frying Pan"; Transliteration: "Tamago to furaipan" (卵とフライパン)	May 22, 1990
The Culture Division celebrates the 20th birthday of Miki who has been working part-time at Touzai for three months. His friend Ueda arrives who is a trainee chef at Western Cuisine Ginka, but he is unhappy because the restaurant owner has little interest in cuisine. Yamaoka asks Ueda to prepare lunch for him and Kurita, and although his fried pork is excellent, Yamaoka declares his omelette a failure. He takes Ueda to the Maison de France, an omelette restaurant, where the owner and chef prepares an omelette in her own way. The difference is marked because of the freshness of her eggs, her preparation and cooking method. Ueda becomes more enthusiastic about cooking and gets a trainee ship at a quality restaurant. The entrance exam involved cooking a simple omelette in which he excelled, assisted by the dedicated egg frying pan Yamaoka had bought for him.
69	"Reunion bowl" Transliteration: "Saikai no donburi" (再会の丼)	May 29, 1990
When Yamaoka cooks up beef tendon in the office for a lost dog, the strong smell annoys the other staff. The owner, Kissho Senkichi, comes to claim the dog and Yamaoka recognizes him as a rakugo student. Kissho's father, rakugoka Fukufukutei Suekichi, sent him to study under Kairakutei Master Hassho. Kissho progressed well and when he became a star performer (真打, shin-uchi), he proposed to Hassho's daughter Keiko and also asked to be announced as the second generation Suekichi to follow his father. However, because of Kissho's popularity, he had developed a huge ego and had lost his edge. Hassho refused both requests and Kissho stormed out, but he was unable to work again as a rakugoka. Yamaoka invites Kissho to perform for the Touzai staff and he invites Keiko and Mr. Black who also a Hassho student. Yamaoka wants to serve a meal but must do it on a limited budget. His solution is to prepare stewed beef tendons (牛筋煮込み, Ushi-kin nikomi) which he cooked slowly over three days and flavored with sake (日本酒, nihonshu), ginger (生姜, shouga), soy sauce (醤油, Shouyu). He then presents the meat with green leafy vegetables and rice, which proves to be a popular hit. As Kissho prepares to perform, Yamaoka reveals that Master Hassho is in the audience. Following Kissho's successful performance, Hassho also tries the stew. He declares that as long as Kissho remains as humble as the meal, he will be the second generation Suekichi.
70	"Brown Rice VS White Rice"; Transliteration: "Genmai tai hakumai" (玄米VS白米)	June 12, 1990
The Touzai Culture Division staff visit the spa at Shirakawa for a vacation where they had previously enjoyed hamanabe and takenoko sashimi. (Note: See episode 29) They arrive and see a judo team training, including Tawara and Kanazawa from Butoku Women's University. They see them again later while eating hamanabe with rice for dinner on the beach. While the staff are celebrating late into the night, three of the judo students arrive desperate to eat white rice. They explain that they are kept on a strict diet which includes only brown rice which they find rough and unpalatable. The girls are caught and reprimanded by Tawara and Kanazawa who argue that their organic brown rice is good for health. Yamaoka disagrees and asks for a week to prove that brown rice can be nutritious and tasty. A week later, Yamaoka is unprepared, so the judo women take him to their dojo where he meets the manager, Takeko Miyamoto. She challenges him to a judo contest, but Kurita intervenes and asks for more time. Meanwhile, Yamaoka had the team's organic brown rice analyzed and it showed traces of fertilizer and antibiotics which had been introduced accidentally through the farm's food chain. Miyamoto apologizes and switches to true organic rice which appeases the judo team and helps them improve their performance.
71	"Fish Without Bones"; Transliteration: "Hone no nai sakana" (骨のない魚)	June 19, 1990
A friend of Hanamura and her husband, Isamu Yarimura, is competing in F3000 races to become a F1 driver. However his performance is suffering because of insomnia and Kurita suggests that Yamaoka should find a solution. Yamaoka realizes that Yarimura's insomnia is caused by him obsessing about minor details of his racing car after Yarimura begins pestering Yamaoka for details of the fish without bones dish Yamaoka suggests for a group dinner. That night Yarimura falls asleep thinking about fish without bones and wins the final race of the championship the next day. That evening they all dine on "zen naing ling wi" a Chinese dish of flathead grey mullet (ボラ, bora) where the flesh is removed, mixed with other ingredients and stuffed back inside the fish's body which is lightly fried and then steamed. Yarimura can now sleep soundly by thinking about topics other than racing when he goes to bed.
72	"Gum Substitute"; Transliteration: "Daiyō gamu" (代用ガム)	June 26, 1990
Deputy Director of the Arts and Culture Department, Tomio Tomii, tries to invite members of staff out drinking, but they all decline except Yamaoka and Kurita. Tomii then reveals he's meeting his younger brother Osamu who is a CEO of a construction company. Their relationship is strained because during the post-war period when the family was very poor, Tomio received a college education while Osamu had to work as their family business failed at the time. Tomii recalls when their father made chewing gum from flour for Osamu, but he doesn't remember and Osamu claims their father was unkind. To prove his statement, Tomii tries to make chewing gum from flour but fails. Later, when Yamaoka is eating nama-fu he realizes wheat gluten can be chewy, and invites the Tomii brothers out to dine again. This time, Yamaoka washes flour under running water until all the starch is dissolved, leaving only the gluten and protein. The brothers try it, and Osamu recalls the smell, taste and texture from his childhood and realizes that his father had in fact created the gum for him, and the brothers are tearfully reconciled.
73	"The Flower of Tofu"; Transliteration: "Tōfu no hana" (豆腐の花)	July 10, 1990
Mr Black seeks out Yamaoka and his associates to see his performance of "Sudofu". It is a story about people who live in an apartment building who scold the owner by giving him rotten tofu because he brags about being a gourmet. Black has fallen in love with Terue who is part of a comedy duo with her sister Teruko. Terue falls ill because she has limited her diet to misoshiru and refuses the potage soup offered by Black. He is despondent because his parents will be arriving from America in a month. Black tries to make a yuba soup but fails. He then tries high protein hikiage yuba (tofu sheets) which is unsuccessful, but instead accidentally creates a thick nutritious soup where the soya bean protein clumps together. Terue initially refuses to try it, but after her sister Teruko reprimands her, Terue tries it and finds it delicious and recovers in time to meet Black's parents.
74	"Black Sashimi"; Transliteration: "Kuroi sashimi" (黒い刺身)	July 24, 1990
Sai Shin'ei (Note: A Chinese name: Cài Jìnróng) is one of a group of Japanese children orphaned in China during WWII who travel to Japan seeking information about their families. Deputy Director Tomii recalls his happy time as a child in China and thinks he recognises Sai as a childhood friend, but he is mistaken. However, Tomii offers to help Mr Sai find his family he was separated from during a Soviet bombardment of Japanese refugees. He was rescued by the Sai family who raised him as their son. His only recollections are of the landscape of the bay where he played as a child and the taste of "black sashimi" he ate with his family. Tomii asks Yamaoka to find Mr Sai's birthplace within a week before he returns to China. Yamaoka and Kurita believe the place Sai described is near Nagai and when they travel there, Yamaoka recalls that the dark liver of the local kawahagi is eaten raw. He arranges for Sai to try it and he immediately recalls the flavor from his childhood, and that his original family name is Sekimoto. Tomii confirms his name as Koichi Sekimoto and later at the orphan information center, they accidentally encounter Koichi's sister Etsuko who had returned to Japan with other refugees. The brother and sister are tearfully reunited after 40 years apart.
75	"Seafood of the Northern Sea"; Transliteration: "Hokkai no sachi" (北海の幸)	August 14, 1990
Tatsuya Miyai is an earnest young man who works as an assistant in the kitchen of the Gourmet Club and impresses Kaibara with his tea making. One day, when he opens the kombu storage cabinet, a cockroach scuttles out and he notices a sheet with a hole in it. Kaibara angrily blames Miyai for not keeping the kitchen clean and fires him. Miyai is devastated, so his coworker Ryouzou Okaboshi calls Yamaoka for advice. They meet in the Okaboshi restaurant and after eating fresh sea urchins Yamaoka invites Miyai to join him and Kurita on a research trip to Rishiri Island. After arriving on the island, they go to an area where kombu is laid out to dry. Miyai sees kombu with a round hole in it and a worker explains it's caused by sea urchins and Yamaoka adds that a cockroach would eat kombu by nibbling at the edges. Meanwhile, Kaibara arrives on the island, and after realizing his mistake, rehires Miyai to work at the Gourmet Club and make tea for him again.
76	"The Charm of the Smell"; Transliteration: "Kusa-sa no miryoku" (臭さの魅力)	September 11, 1990
Ohara secures a business partnership with President Shovan of the french news organization Le Tanne, but during the celebratory dinner they argue about the flavors of Japanese versus French food and the deal is almost broken. Yamaoka is tasked with organizing the next dinner and chooses Mr Chu's Chinese restaurant. The evening goes well until the end when the two company presidents disagree over the strong smells of fermented cheese and fish. Chu then introduces a strong smelling tofu and both executives baulk at the smell. After tasting these foods in which microbes have dissolved the proteins they accept their cultural differences. Yamaoka then introduces the strong smelling funazushi and they all travel to a factory where it is made by fermenting fish which has been stuffed with rice and salted. All agree that the smell is pungent, however when it is eaten with rice and hot tea, they enjoy the taste and congratulate Yamaoka on his diplomatic choice of food.
77	"The Specialty of the Cottage"; Transliteration: "Penshon no meibutsu" (ペンションの名物)	September 18, 1990
In Autumn, the culture division revisit the Chikaraya udon restaurant (Episode 30) and the owner reveals that the three retired sportsmen, Otani, Oyama and Ouma are ready to graduate as chefs. Over dinner, Kurita mentions that the division will spend their holidays at a cottage in Kiyosato run by Yuzuru Takeda who quit last year. They arrive and find the American style cottage comfortable and the French style food excellent, but discover that the business is not doing well. Yamaoka suggests that the problem lies with the fact that it is not clearly differentiated from the competition who offer similar accommodation and food. The others pressure Yamaoka to find a solution, and after trying Takeda's mother's homemade udon, he invites the Chikaraya boys to learn from her. He explains that being an older woman with less strength, she uses more water, making softer noodles with less effort. He also explains that her noodle soup which is a Yamanashi specialty and uses kabocha is also more flavorsome. Everyone agrees, and Takeda and his wife agree to switch their menu to Yamanashi style which makes the business a resounding success.
78	"Ultimate Menu VS Supreme Menu"; Transliteration: "Kyūkyoku no menyū tai shikō no menyū" (究極のメニューVS至高のメニュー)	October 16, 1990
Rival news organization Teito News announces that they will produce a "Supreme Menu", and have engaged Yuzan Kaibara to lead the project. They plan to release it before Touzai News completes their "Ultimate Menu" placing President Ohara in a difficult position. Ohara challenges Yamaoka and the Culture Department to prepare dishes which will be published each month instead of waiting until the menu is complete. Kaibara assigns his wankata Ryouzou Okaboshi to prepare the dishes for the Supreme Menu. He instructs him to let Kurita know that the first appetizer dish will be made with egg and Yamaoka accepts the challenge. The editors of the Weekly Times offer to select judges for the competition and Touzai is forced to agree. At the first Weekly Times tasting, Yamaoka presents a soft-boiled egg accompanied by a truffle sauce which is countered by Kaibara's egg yolk misozuke. Kaibara's dish is surprisingly declared the winner because of the care taken in selection of the miso and eggs.
79	"Ultimate VS Supreme, the Ability with Yolk"; Transliteration: "Kyūkyoku tai shikō Kimi no jitsuryoku" (究極VS至高 黄身の実力)	October 23, 1990
Following the win by Kaibara in the first round of the Ultimate VS Supreme Menu competition, Tōyama objects because of the high quality ingredients that Kaibara used. Kaibara agrees to supply the same eggs to Yamaoka who remakes his dish with just the egg yolks in truffle sauce and the result is declared a tie. However, Kurita later teases Yamaoka, saying that he really lost because he modified his recipe after experiencing Kaibara's dish.
80	"Perseverance and Wild Yam"; Transliteration: "Konki to jinenjo" (根気と自然薯)	October 30, 1990
The Culture Division staff travel to Kamakura to visit Manager Tanimura who has been ill. Yamaoka accidentally bumps into his childhood friend and ex-yakuza Kazuo Hirai who has opened a small restaurant with his wife Tomoe However, although the food is good, business is slow which Yamaoka attributes to the standard Japanese menu. When they visit Kazuo's mother she reacts angrily because of Kazuo's yakuza past and his lack of perseverance. To appease his mother Kazuo offers to cook to local dish, tororojiru (薯蕷汁) consisting of rice with wild yams (山芋, yamaimo). To help, Yamaoka finds a local yamaimo in the forest over a meter long which Kazuo carefully digs out. Tamaoka convinces Mrs. Hirai to visit Kazuo's restaurant and she is greatly impressed by the tororojiru and size of the yamaimo, that she and her son are reconciled. When tororojiru is added to the menu, the restaurant thrives.
81	"The Gift of the Sea Breeze"; Transliteration: "Shiokaze no okurimono" (潮風の贈り物)	November 6, 1990
Yamaoka's friend Okaboshi calls him because he is concerned about the mental health of his brother Ryozo who works at the Gourmet Club. Ryozo was attracted to a young woman called Suzuko, but she became engaged to another chef. The chef then broke off the engagement to marry someone else and Suzuko attempted suicide. She now refuses to eat, and even food prepared by Kaibara cannot tempt her. Yamaoka takes Kurita to Izu seaside where Suzuko grew up and collects local food including brassy chub fish and the seaweed haba nori (幅海苔). He has Ryozo grill the pressed haba nori and the smell reminds Suzuko of the sea breeze and the taste revives and restores her will to live. Later she visits Izu with Ryozo.
82	"Ultimate VS Supreme, the Live Rice"; Transliteration: "Kyūkyoku tai shikō Ikiteiru kome" (究極VS至高 生きている米)	November 13, 1990
The Weekly Times suggests that for the next round of the Ultimate VS Supreme Menu competition, both chefs use the same ingredients and Yamaoka suggests vegetables. Kabara agrees on one condition, that they both use vegetables from the same farm, grown without the use of pesticides. Meanwhile Tabata Kinue invites Yamaoka, Kurita and Hanamura to a dinner she is preparing for her fiancée, Mr. Arakawa, and his mother. Kinue accidentally overcooks the rice after using a new rice-polishing machine, but they discover that problem was the rice had lost too much moisture during storage. On the evening of the Menu competition, Yamaoka presents cabbage rolls stuffed with tiger puffer shirako (白子) while Kaibara presents slivers of raw cabbage heart with a tomato sauce. Kaibara is declared the winner because his dish brought out the charms of the cabbage. Following the win, Kaibara gloats that Yamaoka relied too heavily on the milt for flavor instead of the cabbage's essence, however Yamaoka promises to get revenge in the second course based on turnip.
83	"Ultimate VS Supreme Battle!! Vegetable Edition"; Transliteration: "Kyūkyoku tai shikō taiketsu!! Yasai-hen" (究極VS至高 対決!!野菜編)	November 20, 1990
The Ultimate VS Supreme Menu competition using vegetables continues with dishes based on turnips. Kaibara's dish consists of steamed turnip filled with mushroom paste which proves popular, Kaibara immediately notices Yamaoka's change in expression and orders the contest to be put on hold under the excuse that the mushrooms were overcooked. Yamaoka's version is presented, which is simply turnip steamed with a fish stock, the same technique Kaibara criticized as only surface level. Yamaoka follows Kaibara outside and confronts him about his behaviour, but Kaibara explains that Yamaoka has caused him so much public shame during his rebellious youth that Kaibara intends to impose the same level of shame on Yamaoka whom he rejects as his son. On pins and needles, Yamaoka cannot think of a new dish and is horrified to find that the wild grape juice he was gifted by Kinue had been consumed by the staff. After throwing a fit, Hanamura and Arakawa invite Yamaoka over for dinner, where Kinue had prepared multiple Hakodate dishes. Yamaoka is startled to find that Kinue pickled many vegetables in grape juice for flavor, while preparing a light paste with Walnuts. When the contest is resumed, Yamaoka presents a new dish inspired by Kinue, pickled turnips with walnut paste. This defeats Kaibara's stewed turnips and the contest is declared a 1-1 draw. As the parties return home, Tojin asks Kaibara why he did not prepare a new dish evn if he was fully capable. Kaibara avoids the question, however, leading to Tojin wondering if this was his form of harsh love.
84	"An Ugly Fish"; Transliteration: "Bukiryō na sakana" (不器量な魚)	November 27, 1990
The Culture Department Flower Trio of Touzai News insist on following Yamaoka to a regular evening rendezvous expecting to find a woman, but instead see him meet Inspector Nakamatsu at the "Sai" restaurant run by Naotaro Moriguchi. The specialty of the house is gori chitoseni made using the "ugly" fish endemic to the Sai and Asano Rivers in the Kanazawa Region. Miss Kuniko arrives from the Ryotei Maedaya restaurant, and asks Naotaro to return to the restaurant because the owner was sick and the chef was injured from an accident. Later, over dinner Kuniko explains that Naotaro was to be engaged with the owner's daughter, but she had already fallen in love with Seiji, his junior. As a result, the daughter married Seiji instead. Now, Maedaya was set to host the Kinchakai, an annual meeting with tea masters nationwide arriving. With both the owner and Seiji gone, Naotaro was the only one who could prevent the event from falling into disarray. Yamaoka meets Naotaro the next day, and asks him what he was truly concerned about, and Naotaro felt that he was rejected because of his ugly looks. Yamaoka then asks Naotaro if he intended to become a model or actor, asserting that he should only be ashamed if he had been rejected for his cooking skills. This harsh scolding convinces Naotaro to return and help Maedaya, and this later helps develop into a relationship between Kuniko and Naotaro.
85	"The Warmth of an Ordinary Town"; Transliteration: "Shitamachi no nukumori" (下町の温もり)	December 4, 1990
Inspector Nakamatsu takes Yamaoka and Kurita to a small Fukagawa style restaurant run by his friend Hankichi Tsunahama who prepares peasant style food such as satoimo (里芋), renkon (蓮根) and boiled (煮転がし, nikorogashi) kinmedai (金目鯛) fish. However Nakamatsu reveals that Hankichi was in love with the pop idol, Mayumi Asuka, but she no longer visits him since she became famous. Both from Fukagawa. Nakamatsu reveals that Hankichi and Mayumi were childhood friends and sweethearts. When Mayumi's single mother passed away, Hankichi took loans and started his restaurant to support Mayumi's music schooling, but Mayumi never visited the restaurant again after breaking out in her career. Furthermore, Mayumi has since become betrothed to the businessman Mr. Saga. However, after a sudden fall in stock prices, Saga has called off the engagement and fled the country. A distraught Mayumi visits Hankichi's restaurant and he prepares a traditional Fukagawa nabe (鍋物, stew) for her. She is embarrassed by her past behavior, but Hankichi gladly welcomes her back into his life.
86	"The Table of a Family"; Transliteration: "Kazoku no shokutaku" (家族の食卓)	December 11, 1990
Three months ago on a night out in Kabukicho, Yamaoka and the Culture Department rescue the teenager Yoko Nishio from some men who were harassing her. She explained that although her father Yasukaza is a famous architect and her mother Yoshiko runs the Bisai Cooking School, her home life is unhappy. She invited Yamaoka and Kurita home to meet her parents, and when they visit her home, they realize that her parents don't share the romantic love of teenagers. At the dinner prepared by Yoshiko's students, Yamaoka realizes that her parents have little interest in each other's work or Yoko's wellbeing and he explains this to her parents. Back in the present, Mr. Nishio has received an architecture award, and the Touzai management are invited to the ceremony, including Yamaoka and Kurita. He explains that his winning apartment design features a focus on food preparation and dining contributed by his wife Yoshiko. Later, the Touzai staff attend a garden party at the Nishio home, where Yamaoka and Kurita are greeted by a happy Yoko and they realize that Yoko's parents have overcome their differences and are now more involved in Yoko's life.
87	"Intriguing Karaage"; Transliteration: "Fushigi na karaage" (不思議なからあげ)	December 18, 1990
Some local restaurant owners visit the Touzai offices seeking payment for meals Yamaoka has bought on credit. Kurita lends him the money, but he has to play Santa Claus at an orphanage in return. He proves popular with the children, however the director explains that the orphanage has only one month before they must vacate the premises. Yamaoka learns that the large company, the Yoto group are the owners, and he arranges an introduction to the group's president, Moriguchi. At the opening of the Yoto Ginza Hotel, Yamaoka points out to Moriguchi that the ordinary tasting Karaage frogs legs are from a larger variety ushigaeru (牛蛙) rather than the more flavorsome smaller variety used in China. Moriguchi openly accepts his criticism, and Yamaoka then challenges Moriguchi with a better karaage than his frog's legs. Yamaoka invites Moriguchi to taste his version at the Okaboshi restaurant. Moriguchi is impressed by the excellent flavor and admits defeat. Yamaoka explains that is the quartered head of the torafugu (虎河豚). Yamaoka then asks a favor of the Moriguchi in exchange, and later the orphanage director is surprised to learn that the property owners have decided to allow the institute to remain on the land for free.
88	"Osechi and Bride"; Transliteration: "Osechi to hanayome" (おせちと花嫁)	January 8, 1991
A heya's yobidashi, Oyakata, asks President Ohara to choose an appropriate bride for sumo wrestler Wakayoshiba from three candidates. Ohara suggests that they each prepare osechi dishes to determine the best potential wife. Meanwhile, Sumiko Senkichi, daughter of the heya's former yobidashi, is fond of Wakayoshiba and gets help from Yamaoka to prepare sweet kuromame (black soybean) for her own osechi. The three candidates present their extravagant osechi but Wakayoshiba prefers the home-made version by Sumiko and asks Oyakata if he can marry her. He refuses, but his wife insists that Sumiko and Wakayoshiba are right for each other and she forces him to sanction their marriage.
89	"Ultimate VS Supreme, the Spring of Gyoza"; Transliteration: "Kyūkyoku tai shikō Gyōza no haru" (究極VS至高 餃子の春)	January 15, 1991
Kurita's friend, Yoshiko Morisawa, asks her to help her boss Tsutomu Yamawaki, founder of a chain of Oharu gyoza restaurants. He makes traditional gyoza to a recipe developed by his late wife Oharu, but he is feeling the pressure of competitors and wants to update his menu. Yamaoka offers to create the ultimate gyoza for him. While Yamaoka and Yamawaki are tasting the food at his competitor Mr. Chikada's Ipponyari restaurant which offers 100 types of gyoza, Yamaoka encounters Kaibara who proposes to create the supreme gyoza. Meanwhile, Chikada berates Yamawaki for trying to steal his ideas. Yamaoka later asks Nakagawa of Kaibara's assessment, and Nakagawa states that Kaibara admired the ingenuity but felt a critical identity and taste was missing. When Kaibara learns that Yamaoka was planning to create the ultimate gyoza, he decides to try his hand as well to challenge the Ultimate Menu once again.
90	"Ultimate VS Supreme, Battle! Gyoza Edition"; Transliteration: "Kyūkyoku tai shikō taiketsu!! Gyōza-hen" (究極VS至高 対決!!餃子編)	January 22, 1991
Yamaoka enlists the help of two gyoza masters, Okutsu, who works in a publishing company, and Fang, a Chinese student. They both prepare boiled gyoza and the group is impressed by their versions. The dumplings are made more carefully to withstand boiling, the wrapping is more flavorsome and they do not use garlic as an ingredient. Fang also uses a sauce of black vinegar and sugar to finish his meal. On the day of the battle, Kaibara criticizes traditional Japanese fried gyoza because of inferior wrapping and overuse of garlic. He presents three different steamed gyoza wrapped in translucent rice flour skins; leek, shrimp and fish. Yamaoka then presents his version, boiled gyoza with a meat and vegetable filling, wrapped in wheat flour skins. Although they are highly rated, he looks like losing the battle with Kaibara until he introduces his second effort, a sweet brown sugar gyoza which balances the heavier former version and the battle is declared a tie. Dissatisfied with the decision, Kaibara storms out, while both Chikada and Yamawaki vow to study and improve their respective menus.
91	"The Delicacy of Midwinter"; Transliteration: "Mafuyu no chinmi" (真冬の珍味)	January 29, 1991
Yamaoka and Kurita are sent to a "Battle of Taste" TV quiz, competing against food enthusiasts from Teito News, Sports Times and Shina Economics. Yamaoka is unenthusiastic and during the quiz Touzai is in last place, however Yamaoka displays a strong knowledge of food and Touzai eventually wins. He also promises within a week to produce a product better tasting than the karasumi made from mullet roe presented at the quiz which he asserts was collected out of season. He goes to Nagai Port in Kanagawa where he gets fresh surumeika, from which he extracts the livers, drains and salts them. A week later he presents his dish and the TV host and other contestants declare the flavor is excellent, causing them to reappraise their opinions about gourmet foods. Later, Kurita is furious when Yamaoka reveals that he cashed in their prize, two tickets to Europe.
92	"The Agony of the European Restaurant"; Transliteration: "Yōshokuya no kunō" (洋食屋の苦悩)	February 5, 1991
The Culture Department go to the inexpensive Ginyotei European restaurant for breaded oysters (カキフライ, 牡蠣フライ, kaki furai) but find the chef Nakazato despondent. He believes that he cannot compete with the well-known owner/chef of Restaurant Che Murono, Hiroy Murono who also grew up in Sendai. Yamaoka goes to Che Murono to sample the French-inspired food and orders oysters (namagaki) and brings his own nihonshu (日本酒) rather than order the restaurant's wine. When Murono objects, Yamaoka insists that they eat and drink together to test his palate. Yamaoka proves that the nihonshu tastes better after eating raw oysters because the French wines contain more organic acid and salt which taste fine before eating raw seafood, but are less palatable when drunk afterwards. Yamaoka convinces Murono to visit Ginyotei for kaki furai. To Nakazato's surprise, Murono had also eaten at the same diner as him in the past, and Murono compliments Nakazato for surpassing the old restaurant. Murono's praise is enough for Nakazato's spirit to return.
93	"Ultimate VS Supreme, Rays and Sharks Part 1"; Transliteration: "Kyūkyoku tai shikō Ei to same (zenpen)" (究極VS至高 エイと鮫(前編))	February 12, 1991
After watching a documentary on rays and sharks made by the filmmaker Mr. Fusamoto, Mr. Tanaka proposes making a feature film featuring Fusamoto. Fusamoto refuses because he has taken a dislike to Tanaka, but Yamaoka realizes that he dislikes many things, including the exotic foods he often films as part of his documentaries. Yamaoka goads the picky Fusamoto into tasting the rays and sharks he dislikes. First Yamaoka introduces Fusamoto to jellied shark (nikogori) at a street cart, but he dislikes the natural ammonia smell. Next, along with journalists from the Weekly Times, they travel to the Australia Fair in Osaka Hiroshima, where they try Japanese bullhead shark (こざめ, kozame), with orange sauce. They then go into the hills behind Hiroshima where the eat traditional local dishes based on shark because it was the only fish that could be transported the distance without spoiling. Fusamoto and the journalists are so impressed by the food that they decide the next Ultimate VS Supreme menu challenge will be based on rays.
94	"Ultimate VS Supreme, Rays and Sharks Part 2"; Transliteration: "Kyūkyoku tai shikō Ei to same (kōhen)" (究極VS至高 エイと鮫(後編))	February 19, 1991
In preparation of the Ultimate VS Supreme menu challenge using rays, Kaibara and Yamaoka separately approach Touyama to borrow dark green glazed plates to display the white flesh of the fish. For his dish, Kaibara selects a French style of preparation and Yamaoka also decides on a European approach. At the dinner, Kaibara presents his dish of ray flesh cooked with vinegar which proves popular, then Yamaoka presents his version using the ray's fin. The judges begin arguing over the qualities of each dish until the film director Fusamoto interrupts them and declares that he has been convinced that rays and sharks can taste good. Touyama declares the menu challenge a tie, but is unable to convince Kaibara and Yamaoka to reconcile.
95	"A Passing Porridge"; Transliteration: "Kyūdai ga yu" (及第ガユ)	February 26, 1991
Editor-in-chief Koizumi requests help from Yamaoka. Koizumi's son Norio, a last-year student in jr. high, is not studying for his exams, and instead stays out late, drinking alcohol and getting into trouble. Koizumi believes that, since Yamaoka is a former delinquent, Norio might listen to him. Yamaoka takes Norio to a bar where Yamaoka is greeted by two intimidating men who Norio believes are Yakuza. When their "boss" arrives (who is actually Inspector Nakamatsu) and the discussion turns to illegal drugs, Norio becomes afraid and runs out. Afterwards, Kurita tells Koizumi she believes Norio rebelled against him because he feels neglected. Norio returns to his studies. His mother brings a meal cooked by his father to his room, including a type of rice porridge traditionally eaten by those trying to pass the Chinese Imperial examination. When Norio brings the empty tray back, he asks his father to make the porridge for him again, and father and son seem reconciled. Back at work, Koizumi thanks Yamaoka for the porridge recipe.
96	"The Taste of Edo"; Transliteration: "Edo no aji" (江戸の味)	March 5, 1991
Tomii embarrasses himself in an underground railway station when he sees a rat and he is later reprimanded for overreacting by the Human Resources director, Hiyama. Yamaoka's attempt to cheer up Tomii only makes matters worse, reinforcing Hiyama's plans to cancel the Ultimate Menu project. Yamaoka asks director Ohara for a chance to lampoon Hiyama's taciturn behavior. Mr Black invites the culture department to his opening performance at Mr. Hassho's show about a daimyo in Edo who tried to eat commoner's food which gives Yamaoka an idea. At a formal dinner arranged by Yamaoka, the first dish to arrive is spring onion and tuna hot pot (こざめ, negima), popular with the commoners of Edo. Ohara convinces Hiyama to bite off some of the scalding hot, thick spring onion stem which burns his throat. Before Hiyama can react, Tomii throws himself on the floor, overreacting to eating the hot vegetable, saving Hiyama from embarrassment. However, Hiyama eventually discovers that it was all a plot by Yamaoka to make him lose his composure which he does completely when he physically attacks Yamaoka. Later however, the dinner party all enjoy the same jape at Black's performance.
97	"Grandma's Adventure"; Transliteration: "Bāchan no kake" (ばあちゃんの賭け)	March 12, 1991
An elderly woman from Hakodate enters the Touzai offices to sell the "half-dried squid" she prepared, but as she leaves and crosses the street she is hit by a car and taken to hospital. Inspector Nakamatsu, Yamaoka and the Touzai staff offer to help sell her remaining squid, however she has brought 300kg of squid to sell to help pay for her orphaned granddaughter's wedding. General Affairs Manager Iikura refuses to let the squid be sold in the company's market because he doesn't like squid. Yamaoka offers to convince Iikura that he will enjoy the real taste of squid, or resign. He treats Iikura to freshly caught squid sashimi and freshly caught squid marinated in soy sauce which he enjoys. Iikura agrees to sell the lady's squid at the company market while Yamaoka gets to keep his job.
98	"Is the food three generations?" Transliteration: "Shoku wa Mitsuyo?" (食は三代?)	March 19, 1991
A college friend asks Kurita to host her wedding reception. Her co-host is Soichi Tayama, who comes from a wealthy family but denies his reputation as playboy. Tayama is smitten with Kurita and invites her to his father's Dainichi Hotel restaurant featuring a French chef and his cuisine. Later, Yamaoka and Kurita are sent there to evaluate the restaurant for Touzai News and Tayama joins them with the food critic Takehara. Takehara asserts that Yamaoka and Kurita are too young to develop the Ultimate Menu as that it takes a family three generations to appreciate good food. However, it is a ploy by Tayama to demoralize Kurita. Yamaoka and Kurita correctly identify five different raw meats, and then find no difference in two complex sauces which were mixed up by the kitchen staff so they each had plates with the same sauce. Takehara apologizes for his rudeness. The next day Tayama brings Kurita flowers and asks her to dinner again, but she declines.
99	"Dad's Korokke"; Transliteration: "Chichi no korokke" (父のコロッケ)	April 23, 1991
In spring, Dainippon TV proposes to make a program about which cafeteria has the best food. That day, Mr. Black visits Yamaoka and confesses that he doesn't understand the meaning behind the rakugo story "Parting From My Children", a story about a divorced couple who reunite because of their love for their child. As they leave, the divorced cafetaria chef Aikawa from Touzai News encounters his son Takashi in the street and his story seems parallel the rakugo. Dainippon TV requires that the list of dishes for the competition must include Korokke which is in common in cafeterias. Aikawa makes some flavorsome korokke, however Yamaoka suggests that Aikawa should enter his regular unassuming regular potato korokke. At the competition, Aikawa's simple well-made version of potato with fried meat and onion is chosen as the winner over the exotic korokke from 20 different cafeterias. Takashi convinces his mother to watch the televised program and when she sees the effort Aikawa made, she realizes that he is a changed man and reconciles with him. Meanwhile, Black has observed the interaction between Takashi and his parents which provides the key to him performing the story successfully on stage.
100	"A Luxurious Meal"; Transliteration: "Zeitaku na kondate" (贅沢な献立)	April 30, 1991
Kurita and Yamaoka are dining out in an expensive French style restaurant with Sushimoto's Ms. Natsuko and her boyfriend Mr. Kitao. An old school friend of Kitao and son of the owner of a Ryōtei in Ginza, Yasutaka Ashida, also arrives at the restaurant. Ashida states that he has little interest in the family business and sends an expensive vintage wine to Kitao's table, but Kitao accuses him of being a spendthrift. Later, Ashida's former girlfriend, Nobuko Kanichi, arrives with money for him. However, when she says that her father, a fish commission agent, will no longer provide money for him, he slaps her and leaves. Kitao explains that Ashida rejected Nobuko for another woman who then dumped him. Yamaoka suspects that Ashida is acting out and arranges for Ashida to attend a dinner hosted and funded by Nobuko. Ashida is served luxurious Japanese food which involves a lot of waste, such is the just the skin of a tai and flesh from the fatty belly of a bluefin tuna. The extravagance causes Ashida to realize that he has been selfish and wasteful since the woman he desired dumped him for a man who could provide an even more luxurious lifestyle. He decides to return to the restaurant business and reunites with Nobuko who still loves him.
101	"Bean Sprouts"; Transliteration: "Moyashikko" (もやしっ子)	May 18, 1991
Touzai Deputy Director Tomii's son, Hitoshi, refuses to go on a field trip because his parents will not accompany him when they learn that the parents must also participate in a race. Tomii pressures Yamaoka and Kurita to play Hitoshi's parents for the day. At the school, Yamaoka notices a boy, Masashi, whose parents did not attend because of work, being bullied by other children while Hitoshi stands by. Yamaoka offers to run with Masashi, while Kurita runs with Hitoshi, and they win the race. Later, Hitoshi seeks Yamaoka's help because Masashi is still being bullied and being called a bean sprout and Tomii explained that the children hate bean sprouts. Yamaoka decides to serve the children of Class 5-B bean sprouts for lunch the next day. Initially reluctant, the children soon like his fried egg and bean sprout dish and an imitation shark fin soup (碗仔翅, fukahire) with stir-fried sprouts which enhance its flavour. He then reveals that Masashi spent a long time manually removing the heads and tails of the sprouts to make them taste better and the children change their attitude towards him.
102	"Donburi VS Norimaki"; Transliteration: "Donburi VS nori maki" (丼VSのり巻)	May 21, 1991
Mr. Black invites Yamaoka to lunch to get ideas for an upcoming magazine article on "introducing Japan" and Yamaoka suggests donburi. When the American journalist, Arthur Brown, arrives in Japan to write the article, Yamaoka takes him to different restaurants to sample donburi topped with tempura, chicken and tuna sashimi. Brown is so impressed with the style of food that he highlights donburi in his article as "The Heart of Japan". The loud-talking American then introduces the Italian writer, Anna Marina who initially came to Japan to study martial arts, and she claims that norimaki culture best represents Japan. She demands that Yamaoka take them to the best norimaki restaurants, so he takes them to Ms. Natsuko's sushi restaurant. Natsuko prepares a range of norimaki with different fillings which Brown consumes with gusto. However, Brown is unimpressed until he takes a blind taste test with wasabi maki. Although powerful tasting, the experience finally convinces him that norimaki does encapsulate Japanese culture, and he agrees to Marina writing her article for his magazine.
103	"Gourmet Oriented"; Transliteration: "Gurume shikō" (グルメ志向)	May 28, 1991
The growing economic power of Japan has meant that Japanese people can afford more luxuries, so Koizumi requests that Yamaoka and Kurita write an article about the international restaurants appearing in Japan. He suggests they collaborate with the critic Mr. Sakurada, however, Sakurada feels that the exercise is pointless. He suggests that Yamaoka and Kurita eat in foreign restaurants to see if they still think the Ultimate Menu has a purpose. The pair dine at a couple of restaurants and observe that the Japanese patrons are more interested in displays of wealth than the quality of the food, however they still want to proceed with the article. Sakurada stubbornly refuses and complains to President Ohara about Yamaoka's behavior. To placate Sakurada, Yamaoka takes him to breakfast at a temple in the forest where they eat the traditional breakfast of porridge, takuan and goma tofu. Sakurada is so impressed by the simple but delicious breakfast that he agrees to work with Yamaoka. Ohara is so pleased with Yamaoka and Kurita that he offers to take them to an extravagant and expensive international restaurant, horrifying the two gastronomic journalists.
104	"Skills of the Second Generation"; Transliteration: "Nidaime no ude" (二代目の腕)	June 4, 1991
Mr. Okaboshi takes Yamaoka and Kurita to his friend Norio Tsugawa's tempura restaurant called Ginya. The patronage has declined since Norio took over following his father's his death and the playwright and famous gourmet Yasuichi Kawanishi, complains that the quality is not as good as that of Norio's father. Yamaoka maintains that the tempura is excellent, but suspects that people's expectations are too high. He suggests that Norio create his own nukadoko for preserving his vegetables to accompany the tempura and kakiage. He gets Norio to use high quality, unfertilised rice bran for the nukadoko and invites president Ohara and Kawanishi to try the new menu including tsukemono made using the nukadoko. They are greatly impressed by the meal, and Yamaoka explains that although Norio's tempura was as good as his father's, he had to go one step further with the accompanying tsukemono to be accepted. The result is a success and people flock back to Ginya.
105	"Pasta After Five Years"; Transliteration: "Gonen-me no pasuta" (五年目のパスタ)	June 11, 1991
Yamaoka and Kurita encounter the homeless man Tatsu in a park where they also meet a young man called Shin who is a good cook. Later, Kurita sees a news item identifying Shin as Nobuyasu Yoshimura who abandoned his wife and young child. She and Yamaoka question Shin who explains that he and Kizaki, another young chef, Kizaki, worked at the Mercurio restaurant and loved the owner's daughter, Kumiko. The owner sent them to Italy to study for five years, and offered both the restaurant and his daughter's hand in marriage to the best chef on their return. However two years later, the owner passed away and Shin returned, married Kumiko and took over the restaurant. After five years of study, Kizaki has now returned and challenged Shin to determine who is the best chef and gain Kumiko and the restaurant. Shin become demoralised because he only specialised in pasta dishes. Yamaoka offers to help Shin, and arranges for the chefs to compete using the Touzai kitchen. Kizaki prepares a complex veal dish, which is very impressive, then Shin presents what appears to be a simple maccheroni dish. However, on Yamaoka's suggestion, Shin filled the tubular pasta with a delicious variety of meats, and Kizaki honorably admits that he has been beaten.
106	"Nostalgia Dish"; Transliteration: "Omoide no menyū" (思い出のメニュー)	June 18, 1991
A German luxury cruise line hosts a dinner prepared by head chef Yoshio Terasugi on board their ship for Touzai News staff. Terasugi explains to Yamaoka and Kurita that many years ago he began training in the German restaurant Hansa in Yokohama under the German chef and owner, Ernest Muhler. Terasugi became chef and was engaged to Muhler's daughter Sabine, but a hoodlum who knew of Terasugi's past as a juvenile delinquent blackmailed him. They fought and the hoodlum died, leading to Terasugi spending 10 years in jail. On his release, he travelled to Germany to study cooking, and he asks Yamaoka and Kurita to see if Hansa still exists. They report that it does, with Sabine now the owner and chef but the food lacks spirit and does not include two special items that Terasugi knew Sabine loved, mushroom soup and potato pancake. Yamaoka decides to write an article about German food and invites Terasugi to meet him at Hansa. In contrast to his belief she removed the items out of spite, Sabine tells Terasugi that she only kept them out in the hopes of putting them back once he returned. Thanks to Yamaoka's manipulation, Sabine and Yoshio are happily reunited.
107	"Sea Matsutake Rice"; Transliteration: "Umi no matsutake gohan" (海のマツタケご飯)	June 25, 1991
The famous artist Ginko Kiyotani, a close friend of Kyogoku and Ohara, suffers a cerebral hemorrhage and has to undergo surgery. While the surgery is successful, Ginko suffers amnesia and is unable to recognize his wife or Kyogoku. Kyogoku tells Yamaoka that before Kiyotani collapsed, he told Kyogoku he wanted to cook "sea matsutake rice" for him and claimed it was better than using matsutake mushrooms. However, neither Kyogoku nor Yamaoka have ever heard of the term. Yamaoka goes to Hayama where Kiyotani used to fish and discovers that the key ingredient for sea matsutake rice is a small abalone clam which is gathered from the Shōnan region in summer. He makes the dish according to the Shōnan recipe and serves it to Kiyotani. The familiar flavor prompts the artist to regain his memory and begin to paint again.
108	"The Rain of Umeboshi"; Transliteration: "Umeboshi no ame" (梅干しの雨)	July 2, 1991
Tamayo, Kurita's grandmother, is pestering Kurita about finding a husband, so Kurita is relieved when Yamaoka calls her asking for help. On his way home, Yamaoka had run into two young children, and been told by the apartment building's landlord, that their mother had disappeared several days ago, leaving them to fend for themselves. Through the connections of Tamayo Kurita, it's arranged that the children can stay in the cram school of Mr Hatanaka. One day they run away and Hatanaka believes he was too hard on them when they refused to eat umeboshi. After a long search in the neighborhood, Kurita and Yamaoka find the children and bring them back to their apartment. There, Yamaoka finds umeboshi pickled by their mother, and asserts they are much better than the varieties sold in stores. At that moment, the children's mother returns. After the death of her husband, she had been unable to find work and became distraught and even suicidal, but eventually decided to return to her children. Later on, Yamaoka and Kurita have learned that she started working in Hatanaka's school and wonder how the children are doing.
109	"Toji and Water"; Transliteration: "Toji to mizu" (杜氏と水)	July 9, 1991
Yamaoka and Kurita encounter Inspector Nakamatsu on the street, but their conversation is disturbed by two men struggling nearby and Nakamatsu demands that they explain themselves. They are Tooru Kiyama, a toji (brew master), and Hōji Kinno who runs a nihonshu brewery with his brother. Their product has a poor reputation, and they wanted to improve it so Kinno went to Niigata and hired Kiyama. However, shortly after they arrived in Tokyo, Kiyama became angry and left, leading to the confrontation. Kiyama is unwilling to talk, but after Kinno gives an account of their interaction both Yamaoka and Kurita understand the issue. They explain that because Kinno drank hot tea from a plastic container and smoked tobacco on the train ride, and then enjoyed glasses of tap water in Tokyo, Kiyama felt that he had no sense for water quality which is vital in sake brewing. Yamaoka invites Kinno's older brother who is in charge of the brewing to undertake a water taste test. After the older brother drinks a high quality sake and accurately determines which water was used in the brewing process, Kiyama changes his mind and agrees to work for the Kinnos' company.
110	"Mild Vinegar"; Transliteration: "Yawarakai su" (柔らかい酢)	July 16, 1991
In summer, Yamaoka and the culture division visit Kyoto for the Gion festival, and dine on botan hamo (peony-shaped conger pike). On the return journey he buys some blue mackerel sushi for a friend, but the groups eat half of it on the train. They arrive in Tokyo and discover that it was for Mr. Tojin's wife, Ryoko. Ryoko makes some herself to cover the loss, but it makes Mr. Tojin ill because the fish spoils easily in summer. Yamaoka investigates and discovers that Ms. Ryoko uses distilled rather than brewed vinegar which did not effectively preserve the fish. Yamaoka offers to salvage the situation and takes Ryoko and Kurita to Kagoshima to meet Mr. Takenoshina, a master black vinegar maker. He explains the difference between black and white vinegar, and shows them his traditional method of making the mild black vinegar called kurozu (黒酢), in rows of pots outdoors where the warmth of the sun promotes the fermentation process. The group return to Tokyo where Yamaoka demonstrates his method of preparing mackerel sushi, filleting and pickling the fish, adding rice, rolling it in kombu and slicing it up to serve. Later, Ryoko makes a delicious new batch of mackerel sushi for Tōjin and he forgives her earlier mistake.
111	"Cooking Skills and Painting Skills"; Transliteration: "Ryōri to egokoro" (料理と絵ごころ)	July 23, 1991
Kichi, an aspiring artist and heir to the famous 100 year old Shibahama restaurant in Kanda, is disinterested in the family business. Meanwhile, Ohara asks Yamaoka and Kurita to accompany him to Shibahama to evaluate the food for the Ultimate Menu, but also to investigate why the elderly owner is not prepared to hand it over to his son. The older Shibahama makes a feature of presenting sea goblin, preparing the skin and flesh separately to bring out their individual characteristics. Kichi reveals that he is only interested in art and his father tells his guests that he is disappointed in his son. Kichi invites Touzai New to his solo exhibition opening and Ohara sends Yamaoka and Kurita. Yamaoka criticizes Kichi's paintings of fish, asserting that the subjects would not be served in a quality restaurant and demonstrates why, using the Shibahama chefs as judges. Kichi realizes his mistake and surprisingly destroys his paintings, then applies himself to improving his cooking skills.
112	"The Heart of Hojicha"; Transliteration: "Hōjicha no kokoro" (ほうじ茶の心)	July 30, 1991
On a hot summer's day, Yamaoka and Kurita see tea being roasted to make hojica which prompts him to recall the time he went home to visit his sick mother. Kaibara bullied her into make hojicha and she complied, even though Yamaoka tried to stop her and broke her roasting pot. Meanwhile, Manager Tanamura asks Yamaoka to visit the novelist, Mr. Riichi Kamura who is writing a series for Touzai News, but is behind schedule and has complained about the quality of the tea Touzai have sent him. Yamaoka reluctantly agrees although he dislikes fussy people like artists. Yamaoka and Kurita arrive at the Kamura household with some fresh tea to make hojicha, however Riichi is rude to his wife and storms out. Yamaoka then shows Mrs. Kamura how to slowly roast the green leaves on mulberry paper over hot coals, and then make hojicha. Yamaoka tells her how his mother did the same after he broke her pot, and Mrs. Kamura tells him that even though his mother was bullied, she may have derived comfort in her husband's success. Mr. Kamura returns home ready to work and praises the tea, giving Mrs. Kamura a strong feeling of satisfaction and causing Yamaoka to reflect on the relationship between his parents.
113	"Cool Breeze Somen"; Transliteration: "Ryōfū sōmen" (涼風そうめん)	August 13, 1991
Yamaoka accompanies Yūko Kurita and her grandmother, Tamayo, on a shopping trip. Grandma Tamayo insists on consulting a fortune teller about Yūko's future with Yamaoka, however, the elderly man collapses from the heat and they take him to a hospital. In the hospital they learn that his name is Ohashi, and he is the former head of an advertising agency. Mr Ohashi says he is telling fortunes to gather data for a psychological research project. Grandma Tamayo insists on nursing him back to health but she also falls ill from the heat and effort. Kurita, Tabata and Hanamura visit her and find that Mr. Ohashi is now nursing her, but she finds the somen he cooks unpalatable so they ask Yamaoka about a way to improve the recipe. Yamaoka buys some Miwa somen from Nara, which he says are the best, and shows them how to prepare the noodles and dipping sauce. Grandma Tamayo is happy with the flavor and texture and regains her appetite. A delighted Ohashi then asks Tamayo for a date.
114	"Aged Liquor"; Transliteration: "Kūsū" (古酒(クースー))	September 3, 1991
At a Wine & Spirits Expo in Maruzakaya, Higashi Ginza, Yamaoka and Kurita see a man a who has become inebriated from tasting too many liquors. Later, President Ohara asks them to interview Shinichi Furuyoshi, the famous literary critic. When they meet him, they realise he is the man they saw earlier and he is drunk again. Furuyoshi asserts that he drinks because Japan lacks a strong "spirit" and Japan consequently lacks the literary strength of cultures which have produced strong spirits such as whiskey, cognac and vodka. Kurita suggests that Japan is going through a shochu boom, but he argues that it lacks the depth of character compared with liquors which have aged for more than 30 years. Yamaoka accuses Furuyoshi of knowing nothing about wines and being obsessed with Western culture. Furuyoshi contacts Touzai to have him fired, but Yamaoka convinces president Ohara to take Furuyoshi to Okinawa. Yamaoka arranges for them to taste distilled Awamori which has been aged for 20, 30, 40 years and more. Furuyoshi tastes the Awamori and declares that it is equal to the other liquors, forgiving Yamaoka for his former rudeness. Some time later Yamaoka and Kurita encounter Furuyoshi in the street, drunk again and unconcerned about literature. Yamaoka declares that Furuyoshi is not a connoisseur, just a heavy drinker.
115	"The Secret of Spices"; Transliteration: "Supaisu no himitsu" (スパイスの秘密)	September 17, 1991
A policeman finds a man dressed as a chef on the handrail of Miharabashi Bridge who cannot recall who he is, but holding a piece of paper with a list of Katakana characters and numbers. Inspector Nakamatsu asks Touzai to place a notice in its newspaper and his wife Keiko, recognizes him as Yutaka Mizoki, a chef obsessed with creating the perfect curry mix for their small restaurant. She explains that her former pimp demanded that she return with him and beat up Yutaka who then disappeared. Yamaoka suggests that he and Yutaka cook a curry together in his restaurant, and Yamaoka uses the information on Yutaka's list to specify the ingredients. The process causes him to retrieve his memory, but he says he cannot recall anything after he arrived home. Nakamatsu suggests that when he arrived home he fell and injured himself on the stairs, but Nakamatsu, Yamaoka and Kurita realize that he is faking a partial memory loss to protect Keiko from feeling guilt and embarrassment.
116	"New Project"; Transliteration: "Atarashii kikaku" (新しい企画)	October 15, 1991
Mr. Nita, chief editor of Touzai Graph a weekly pictorial magazine, invites the Culture Department to participate in production of a "Global Food Tour" article. When the attractive Ms. Mariko Niki joins the team, Yamaoka eagerly volunteers to contribute to the project. During an argument about the content of the project, Yamaoka suggests investigating boar stew and Ohara agrees. Yamaoka's friend, Kissho Senkichi leads a wild boar hunt, but they are pursued by a boar and although Senkichi's dog Koro saves him, it suffers near-fatal injuries. When the draft article is presented to editor Nita, including the incident with the dog, he criticizes it for being lightweight and not about gourmet food. Yamaoka then invites Nita to try wild boar stew, and after tasting it, Nita is so hugely surprised at the tenderness and flavor of the meat that he casts aside his prejudices about wild boar cuisine and praises Mariko's article. Later Mariko tells Kurita of her intention to romantically pursue Yamaoka, and she offers to compete fairly.
117	"Prohibited Bird"; Transliteration: "Kindan no tori" (禁断の鳥)	May 28, 1991
The first "Global Food Tour" article by Mariko Niki is a success, and she takes Yamaoka and Kurita to meet her father who is head of Nito bank. However, Mr. Niki has also invited Kaibara to dinner, thinking that there is only friendly rivalry between the Ultimate and Supreme menu creators, not realizing the animosity that exists between Yamaoka and Kaibara. The first dish served is whole roasted bird, and both Yamaoka and Kaibara identify it as a Japanese thrush which is a protected bird species. Kabara soundly reprimands the chef, then loudly criticizes Yamaoka for not recognizing the bird until he tasted it, causing him huge embarrassment. Yamaoka does not return to work for 10 days, but then arrives looking and smelling like a "bum". He claims to have identified the location of the bird traps and leads a Touzai expedition to where nets have been erected to catch the migrating birds but also catch other endangered species. Later that night, when the poachers arrive, they are caught by the police and photographed by Touzai staff for another Touzai Graph article by Mariko. Later, Mr. Niki shows the article to Kaibara which also details the effort Yamaoka made to find the poachers, but Kaibara makes no comment.
118	"The Spirit of Challenge"; Transliteration: "Chōsen seishin" (挑戦精神)	June 4, 1991
Mariko Niki suggests hiring award-winning photographer Isamu Kinjō for the Global Food Tour articles in Touzai Graph but he refuses, saying that focusing on food is frivolous. However, Kurita does not give up, and presses Kinjō while he drives his old Datsun Bluebird, a car built in Japan that he explains displayed the challenge spirit of Japan against US car manufacturers in the post-war era. Kurita seeks help from Yamaoka who suggests the Hida Takayama morning market, and takes Mariko and Kurita there the night before to arrive early and select a range of ingredients to provide a dish to tempt Kinjō. Yamaoka heats a dried silver magnolia leaf over a hibachi, to heat soybean paste and combine it with a salted vegetables and steamed rice to make a simple dish which is a specialty of Hida. Kinjō is excited by what he exclaims is a real taste of Japan, and Kurita challenges him to create a photograph that captures the essence of the experience. Later, Kinjō visits the Touzai offices accepts Kurita's challenge.
119	"Japanese Roots"; Transliteration: "Nihon no nekko" (日本の根っこ)	June 11, 1991
Photographer Isamu Kinjō is concerned about his friend, the successful fashion designer Hide Hirao who is based in Paris. Hirao is exhausted by years of business and after visiting Japan, he is homesick and reluctant to return to Paris. Kinjō asks Yamaoka to prepare some dishes that will entice Hirao back to Europe. Yamaoka refuses until Kinjō says that he will ask his friend Yuzan Kaibara and the scene is set for another contest between Kaibara and Yamaoka. Kurita suggests that Yamaoka prepare something Japanese but he disagrees. At the dinner, Yamaoka presents some excellent French style dishes, and Hirao declares that if he could have such delicious French food in Japan he need not return to Paris surprising everyone at the table. Next, Kaibara presents a simple dish of rice steamed in bamboo leaves accompanied by salted, pickled cucumber and a glass of mountain spring water. Hirao then exclaims that he has tasted the essence of Japanese cuisine. He feels revitalized after rediscovering his Japan roots and plans to return to Paris. However, this leaves Yamaoka angry at himself and feeling defeated by Kaibara's tactics.
120	"Jumbo Chawanmushi"; Transliteration: "Janbo chawanmushi" (ジャンボ茶碗蒸し)	June 18, 1991
Yamaoka encounters an assertive woman in the street and saves her from a speeding car. The woman then trips and breaks the heel of her shoe and she blames Yamaoka. He discovers that she is Mariko Niki's aunt Teruko. When they meet with her date, the writer Mr. Katamori, she insults him for being late and poorly dressed, and leaves. Later, she arrives at the Touzai offices and invites Yamaoka to dinner, knowing Katamori will be there intending to make him jealous. She invites Yamaoka out again to an exclusive restaurant, but meanwhile Yamaoka contacts Katamori who tells him that Teruko likes chawanmushi and cabbage roll. Yamaoka arranges for the chef to cook jumbo size versions of the dishes. When they are served, Katamori arrives and accuses Teruko of demanding perfection to an equally outrageous degree as the meal, and breaks up with her. She then realizes the flaws in her own character and asks to be forgiven for behaving badly towards him. Later, Teruko visits Yamaoka in the Touzai offices to thank him for repairing her relationship with Katamori and in return offers to help Yamaoka date Mariko Niki, much to Kurita's surprise.
121	"Life and Bowls"; Transliteration: "Inochi to utsuwa" (命と器)	June 25, 1991
Chairman Niki asks Mariko, his granddaughter, what she sees in Yamaoka. Mariko answers that she thinks Yamaoka is a free spirit who is unafraid to go against the expectations and restraints of society. Chairman Niki meets with President Ohara and inquires about Yamaoka. Ohara describes Yamaoka as a lazy and difficult employee who doesn't follow orders. Niki then angrily asks him why he let his granddaughter work with such a man and leaves abruptly. Niki meets Tōjin Tōyama in a restaurant and Tōyama has invited Yamaoka to join him. Tōyama presents Niki with a precious tea bowl he has made but a waitress accidentally chips the bowl which causes Niki to scream at her in fury. Yamaoka thinks back to a time when his father yelled at him for breaking a plate. He goes to the kitchen and brings back soba flour and uses the broken bowl to make dough (sobagaki) and offers Niki and Tōyama to eat it with soy sauce. Yamaoka says that all precious things can be broken but human life is the most precious of all. Chairman Niki regrets his outburst and apologizes to the waitress. Later, Niki and Ohara meet over a meal and Niki says he likes Yamaoka and would allow him to marry into the Niki family.
122	"Spicy Mentaiko"; Transliteration: "Karashi mentaiko" (辛し明太子)	July 2, 1991
The 'Global Food Tour' team meets with Editor-in-chief Koizumi who praises Kinjō for his work and offers him a packet of spicy mentaiko which he recommends grilling. Kinjō doesn't want it because he says it makes his tongue numb and adds that grilled roe becomes hard and dry. Koizumi says that someone so sensitive to spicy food can't go on the Global Food Tour which irritates Kinjō, and both men lose their temper. Yamaoka then says that Kinjō knows nothing about cooking roe and that mentaiko is terrible food, which makes them even angrier and Koizumi threatens to fire Yamaoka. Yamaoka asks for three days to prove his case. They meet again in the Okaboshi restaurant and Okaboshi serves them spicy mentaiko. Kinjō notices his tongue doesn't go numb and Yamaoka explains the reason wasn't the spiciness but food additives like MSG. Then they are served grilled tarako (cod roe). One is small and tastes dry and feels hard. A large one however tastes delicious. Yamaoka explains that if the fish is caught before spawning season the roe is not mature and is unsuitable for grilling. Koizumi and Kinjō apologize to each other for acting out of ignorance.
123	"Ultimate VS Supreme, Battle! Spaghetti"; Transliteration: "Kyūkyoku tai shikō taiketsu!! Supagetti" (究極VS至高 対決!!スパゲッティ)	December 3, 1991
Mariko Niki suggests to Yamaoka that they eat lunch at an Italian restaurant and Kurita decides to join them. When they arrive, they overhear Yūzan Kaibara telling the chef off for serving him unacceptable carbonara. As Kaibara is leaving, he spots Yamaoka and tells him the next round of the Ultimate VS Supreme Menu competition will be about spaghetti dishes. Yamaoka thinks he will adapt spaghetti to Japanese tastes. Kurita disagrees but when Niki says she's being nonconstructive, Kurita becomes upset and leaves. The supreme side presents garlic spaghetti and tomato sauce spaghetti. The ultimate side presents spaghetti with sea urchin eggs and salmon roe and spaghetti with abalone sauce and thin slices of abalone. The supreme side is declared winner because its simple dishes brought out the original deliciousness of the pasta, whereas the dishes of the Ultimate side completely obscured the flavor. After the defeat, a glum Yamaoka asks Kurita to eat dinner with him and says he should have listened to her and that they work best together as a team.
124	"An Embarrassing Dish"; Transliteration: "Hazukashii ryōri" (恥ずかしい料理)	July 9, 1991
A handsome young couple visit Kurita at work and they go out to dinner with Yamaoka who suggests a high class restaurant. At dinner, the couple confess to being embarrassed at being stared at because of their good looks. After dinner, the women and men split up, and Toshiko takes Kurita to her family's factory where they produce pre-packaged food. Later, Toshiko enjoys the simple pleasure of eating rice with butter and soy sauce, however she is embarrassed by her plain tastes. The next day when Kurita relates the story, Yamaoka laughs because that night, Kyoichi took Yamaoka to his family's construction company's worker accommodation where Kyoichi dressed as a construction worker and they enjoyed sorice, steamed rice with oyster sauce. In an effort to resolve the situation, Yamaoka and Kurita ask the Cultural Department staff for the most embarrassing foods that they enjoy, and invite Toshiko and Kyoichi to participate. When their simple dishes of rice with sauce are revealed, they are hugely embarrassed, but realize that they are both just ordinary people and can find happiness together.
125	"New Year's Udon"; Transliteration: "Toshikoshi udon" (年越しうどん)	July 16, 1991
Chef Okaboshi creates a nabeyaki udon dish for Yamaoka, Kurita and Tōjin Tōyama and he credits the famous gourmet, Mr. Takaragi, for its success. Okaboshi's younger brother Ryozo arrives, and reports that he met Ms. Fuyumi at the ski resort. Okaboshi then tells the story of how he met Fuyumi while training to be a chef. He asked her to marry him, and they opened a restaurant together, however, the restaurant did poorly. One evening, they had an important reservation, but the client cancelled. Okaboshi used the expensive top quality ingredients to make a special nabeyaki udon for Fuyumi. That night Takaragi arrived late and was so impressed by the dish, that he returned regularly with his friends and the restaurant prospered. Okaboshi finishes his story by telling how Takaragi died, the restaurant was destroyed by fire and Fuyumi left, leaving Okaboshi who blamed himself for his poor luck. Ryozo then explains that Fuyumi told him that her previous husbands had died, and she blamed herself for bringing bad luck to Okaboshi. Yamaoka and Kurita take Okaboshi to the ski resort where they catch Fuyumi at the railway station just before she leaves. He takes her to a restaurant where he orders a dish of plain udon, saying that it is as empty as his heart. They are happily reunited, and the Touzai staff all have their New Year's Udon at Okaboshi's restaurant.
126	"The Porgy Inside the Porgy"; Transliteration: "Tai no tai" (タイのタイ)	July 23, 1991
On New Year's day, President Ohara invites the Touzai staff to lunch at his home. Ohara also invites his childhood friend and rival, the wealthy Inota Okawa, who sees himself as a gourmand. Okawa arrives, and after insulting Ohara, he presents live tai or red sea bream (Note: Called "porgy" in the English translated version.) freshly flown in from Akashi. His chefs grill the fish and present small portions to the guests as a way of demonstrating his wealth. Yamaoka correctly identifies the dish as the cheek fat of the fish and how it was prepared, but he says that another part is equally delicious. Yamaoka carefully extracts a section of the fish behind the head and offers it to Okawa who finds it delicious, thus restoring Ohara's status. Yamaoka then demonstrates that the remaining fish's scapula and coracoid bones resemble a red seabream and are called tai no tai which is considered a good luck charm. Ohara and Okawa then fight over the charm until Yamaoka points out that there are two in every fish, but the two rivals still find something to argue about.
127	"Two Bridal Candidates"; Transliteration: "Futari no hanayome kōho" (二人の花嫁候補)	July 30, 1991
One winter, Yamaoka does not turn up for work for three days so Kurita and Mariko go to visit Yamaoka at home. They meet Ms. Chiyo who takes them to his rooms on the top of a run-down apartment building. Ms. Chiyo is the wife of chef of the Gourmet Club and has known Yamaoka since he was a child. She embarrasses the women by saying they would make good marriage candidates for Yamaoka . A fire breaks out in the adjacent building, and while Yamaoka and other residents rush to extinguish the fire, Ms. Chiyo instructs the two women to prepare food for the firefighters, and also to assess their cooking skills. The women only find meagre ingredients, but Kurita finds some Daiginjō and together they heat it up with water to make a sweet hot warming drink, then use the otheringredients to make a delicious savoury salmon soup. They both receive credit from Ms. Chiyo for their effort, but Yamaoka later learns that Kurita requested the cooking instructions by phone from the chef Mr. Okaboshi.
128	"The True Value of Kajiki"; Transliteration: "Kajiki no shinka" (カジキの真価)	August 13, 1991
After finishing a photo shoot of food for the Ultimate Menu, Yamaoka, Kurita, Mariko and Kinjō go to Sushi Tomo and encounter Mr. Hirano, the feature editor of the competing Teito News and two coworkers. When Kinjō asks for kajiki sashimi, they make disparaging remarks for requesting an inferior fish. Kinjō replies that his family was poor, living in Chiba, and to them the occasional time they ate kajiki sashimi was a special treat. He asks Yamaoka to evaluate kajiki and Yamaoka decides on Choshi food for the next topic of the Global Food Tour and invites the Teito News staff to return to Sushi Tomo in a few days. Yamaoka takes Kurita, Mariko and Kinjō to Chiba where they go out on a fishing boat in the cold rough waters harpooning for striped marlin. They return to Sushi Tomo where the chef prepares kajiki sushi and sashimi which everyone declares is delicious. Yamaoka explains that the fish is at its best in winter which is when Kinjō's mother bought the fish. Kinjō is inspired to go out and take more photographs of the harpoon fishing and his photographs contribute to the article's huge success.
129	"Pizza and Yokozuna"; Transliteration: "Piza no yokodzuna" (ピザの横綱)	January 28, 1992
Noriko Hanamura's husband invites Yamaoka and Kurita to a new pizza restaurant opened by her husband's friends. While there, sekitori sumo wrestler Kagaminada of Shimatakabeya arrives for pizza, but he is more interested in the owner's sister Toshiko Iimura. The group invites Kagaminada to eat with them but he mentions that his oyakata (Note: Sumo coach.) should not know about it because sumo should only eat chanko food to gain enough weight to be competitive. For the party farewell before a regional tour, Yamaoka prompts sumo Yokozuna to suggest eating at Iimura's pizza restaurant. The oyakata reluctantly agrees, and surprisingly finds the pizzas to his liking, especially the huge yokozuna pizza. When the oyakata observes Kagaminada's love for Toshiko, he insists that Kagaminada should eat there every day. Later, an energized Kagaminada wins his bout on the regional tour.
130	"The Spirit of the Sardine"; Transliteration: "Iwashi no kokoro" (いわしの心)	September 17, 1991
Chairman Niki asks Ohara for Touzai News to design and manage a restaurant on the top floor of the Nito group's new headquarters. Ohara is reluctant, but when Niki threatens to offer the opportunity to Teito News, Ohara accepts and assigns the task to a reluctant Yamaoka. When Yamaoka starts working on the project, Niki offers him a 51% stake in the restaurant if he joins the Nito group. Yamaoka encounters Teruko, Mariko's aunt, who implies Yamaoka is expected to marry Mariko which leaves Kurita visibly upset. Later, Yamaoka invites Chairman Niki to the Sarden restaurant and he arrives to see Yamaoka, Kurita, Mariko and Kinjō. The group enjoys the offerings of the restaurant, all the dishes include sardine. Yamaoka explains that the owner built the restaurant from scratch using a fish that has traditionally been seen as inferior then adds that he cannot accept the offer because he would be achieving something without using his own ability. Chairman Niki understands Yamaoka's principles, but wants Yamaoka to continue his work on the new restaurant and he agrees. As they walk home, a relieved Kurita offers to take Yamaoka out for a drink.
131	"Ultimate VS Supreme, Battle of Sweets!"; Transliteration: "Kyūkyoku tai shikō Kashi taiketsu" (究極VS至高 菓子対決!!)	November 2, 1992
The next Ultimate VS Supreme menu contest involves desserts, but Yamaoka is undecided about what to prepare. Meanwhile, Toujin invites Yamaoka to a new teahouse he designed for the owner of Kanzendo, but he also invites Kaibara. The delicacy offered with the tea is monaka, crisp shells containing sweet muscat grapes which must be consumed within 5 minutes before they go soft. Kaibara cryptically hints that the secret to the basic dessert is contained within the tearoom leaving Yamaoka initially confused, but he then realizes the secret is persimmon. On the day of the contest, Kaibara presents partially dried ripe persimmons which are both sweet and soft, arguing that it lies between fruit and a modern sugar-based dessert. Yamaoka counters with persimmon, but has the empty fruit filled with a jelly containing persimmons mellowed in a sake cask (樽柿, たるがき, tarugaki) and the fruit soaked in gin with a little sugar to create a sweet dessert. The result is declared a tie leaving Yamaoka frustrated, although Kaibara demands a rematch but with more imagination next time.
132	"The Gift of the Sun"; Transliteration: "Tenpi no okurimono" (天日の贈り物)	February 18, 1992
Director Koizumi is depressed because the cat, Pasha, he is taking care of has stopped eating after having indigestion. It even refuses to eat its favorite food, dried horse mackerel that Koizumi buys from different places which he says tastes fine. Desperate, Koizumi threatens to cut Yamaoka's salary if he does not find a solution. Yamaoka, takes Koizumi a local fish market where he buys fresh horse mackerel, then prepares and dries it naturally in the sun. He then takes Koizumi to a stockfish factory to buy some horse mackerel where they force-dry frozen imported fish in high volume. That night, Yamaoka offers three types of dried horse mackerel to Pasha who selects and eats only one of the three offerings. The adults then taste the same fish and Koizumi declares that the sun-dried fish tastes much better, but Koizumi again threatens to cut Yamaoka's salary after he implies that Koizumi had a less-discerning palate than the cat.
133	"The Crab and the Monkey"; Transliteration: "Sarukanigassen" (猿蟹合戦)	February 25, 1992
Ms. Kinue Tabata has to cancel the reception for her wedding to Mr. Arakawa after Arakawa has to pay an old friend's large debt. Meanwhile, wealthy art collector Sataka sees one of a set of carved wooden three wise monkeys in a photo of a ceramic vase taken by Arakawa and owned by the notoriously difficult collector, Hoichi Matsumori. Sataka owns the other two figures and offers whatever it takes to obtain the third one. Arakawa, along with Yamaoka and Kurita approach Matsumori who agrees the three pieces should be united, but only on the condition that he and Sataka have dinner together. If he finds that Sataka is not a worthy person, he threatens to burn the piece. Yamaoka agrees to plan the meal, and gives Sataka a crash course in food preparation. On the evening of the dinner, Sataka prepares the food for Matsumori, consisting of simple rice balls done in different ways with selected fillings, disarming Matsumori who is prepared for a contest. Matsumori realizes that Sataka has recreated the Monkey-Crab Battle and willingly agrees to give the monkey figure to Sataka for his effort.
134	"Sole and Flatfish"; Transliteration: "Karei to hirame" (カレイとヒラメ)	March 3, 1992
Koichi, one of Ohara's grandchildren, fails to get into his first choice university and becomes discouraged. Ohara gets Yamaoka to cheer him up over dinner and he is successful until Ohara disparages the sole they have for dinner instead of the more expensive flatfish even though they taste almost the same, undermining Yamaoka's good work. However, the dinner gives Yamaoka an idea for the Global Food Tour and he asks Koichi to help him. Yamaoka takes the Global Food Tour team with Koichi out on a fishing boat before dawn and they catch a number of fish. When they return, Yamaoka prepares both sole and flatfish sashimi and asks Koichi to pick the difference and choose which one is best. Koichi can tell the difference based on taste and texture, but also says that different people will choose the one that suits their taste. He then decides that he should choose his university based on what it offers rather than its reputation.
135	"The Ultimate Wedding Reception Part 1"; Transliteration: "Kyūkyoku no hirōen (zenpen)" (究極の披露宴(前編))	March 10, 1992
After overhearing Tabata planning for her wedding, the Touzai Culture Department decides on a wedding reception for the next round of the Ultimate VS Supreme Menu and offers to pay the costs. However, when Arakawa invites his mentor, Mr. Yuji Kiso, to the reception, he refuses because he considers them a petty event. Kurita realizes that Kaibara knows Kiso and asks him to invite Kiso, but Kaibara only agrees if Kurita can make a tea appropriate for the occasion. She calls on Yamaoka for help but he does not arrive in time so Kurita makes a drink based on cherry blossom petals, cinnamon and pickled cherry blossom. Kaibara approves, but mainly so that he can beat the Ultimate Menu in the contest.
136	"The Ultimate Wedding Reception Part 2"; Transliteration: "Kyūkyoku no hirōen (kōhen)" (究極の披露宴(後編))	March 17, 1992
The Ultimate VS Supreme wedding reception menu is to be held over two weddings. The first is the Supreme Menu at the Nakai and Aotani wedding, and the Touzai Cultural Department staff attend. The meal is presented as a double-layer bento box containing the simple foods that the husband and wife ate growing up as a way of introducing the two families to each other. For the Tabata and Arakawa wedding with the Ultimate Menu, Yamaoka selects the grounds of the Yonezo Art Gallery. He also presents bento boxes, but with dishes containing wild grasses growing in the grounds of the gallery collected by the wedding couple. When the couple prepare to cook vegetable tempura, Kiso intervenes and tells Arakawa that he should also have taught him how to cook, and congratulates him on a successful event. Again, the result is declared a tie, partly to avoid the embarrassment of declaring one wedding better than the other.

=== Television Specials ===
No.	Title	Original release date
1	"Oishinbo: Ultimate VS Supreme"; Transliteration: "Oishinbo: Kyūkyoku Tai Shikō, Chōju Ryōri Taiketsu!!" (美味しんぼ 究極対至高 長寿料理対決!!)	December 11, 1992
President Ohara has a health scare, so the Touzai Shimbun and Teito Times agree to focus on recipes which prolong life in the next round of the competition between, Touzai's Ultimate Menu and Teito's Supreme Menu. Kurita suggests the that team travels to Okinawa because of the long lifespan of residents there. They meet the restaurant owner, Noguchi Hatsumi, who introduces them to traditional shinji food consisting mainly of pork, vegetables and herbs, seaweed and tofu, plus the local specialty of sea snake. The group flies to Ishigaki-jima south-west of Okinawa island. From the airplane, they see red clay soil flowing into the sea as the result of intensive commercial agriculture. They land, and learn about the planned New Ishigaki Airport in the Shiraho district, which could cause a greater threat to the Shiraho Coral Reef. They encounter Kaibara who is being courted by a developer looking for support to construct a resort adjacent to the new airport. However, Kaibara refuses to help him because of his greed for short-term financial gain, which will destroy the ingredients of a long life. This provides a hint to Yamaoka on how to develop his menu. Back in Tokyo, the menu contest is held at the restaurant Sumitori. Kaibara presents dishes with exotic and expensive ingredients, but also says that eating any healthy food regularly is the secret to long life. Tōyama then proposes that the simple diet of monks effectively enables them to live a long life. Yamaoka disagrees, and surprises everyone by arguing that the Japanese diet is not balanced, is lacking in some essential nutritional elements and is in fact unhealthy. He then presents his menu, the type of food people should eat every day for a long life. His dishes consist of commonly available foods combined in the appropriate proportions which provide nutrition and assist in combating disease.
2	"Oishinbo: Japan-US Rice War"; Transliteration: "Oishinbo: Nichibei Kome Sensō" (日米コメ戦争)	December 3, 1993
The next round of the competition between Touzai's Ultimate Menu and Teito's Supreme Menu is decided to be "side dishes for rice". Daikon is the first ingredient and both Kaibara and Yamaoka present excellent samples and the contest ends in a draw. However, Kaibara announces that cheap United States rice is ruining the palates of Japanese people because they are losing the taste for aromatic rice such as kaorimai. Later, at a dinner at Touzai a heated argument develops over the upcoming trade talks between the USA and Japan over the demand to open Japanese markets to US agricultural imports, including rice. The Deputy Prime Minister invites Yamaoka and Kurita to the talks with the Americans, who are offended when Yamaoka challenges them about the purity of their rice. Kurita arranges a second meeting where she displays her diplomatic skills and also invites Kaibara, much to Yamaoka's annoyance. Through his food and pottery, Kaibara shows the strong connection between rice and Japanese culture, but Yamaoka raises the usage of chemicals in the cultivation and post-harvest transportation. He convinces the negotiators that price is not the only issue, and that both Japan and the USA must consider health and safety of the product in the trade negotiations.
