= Hara hachi bun me =

Japanese advice about eating habits

Hara hachi bun me (腹八分目) (also spelled hara hachi bu, and sometimes misspelled hari hachi bu) is a Confucian-inspired teaching that instructs people to eat until they are 80 percent full. The Japanese phrase translates to "Eat until you are eight parts (out of ten) full", or "belly 80 percent full". There is evidence that following this practice leads to a lower body mass index and increased longevity, and it might even help to prevent dementia in the elderly.

== Effects ==
Body mass index chart

Biochemist Clive McCay, a professor at Cornell University in the 1930s, reported that significant calorie restriction prolonged life in laboratory animals. Authors Bradley and Craig Wilcox along with Makoto Suzuki believe that hara hachi bun me may act as a form of calorie restriction, and therefore extend the life expectancy for those who practice this philosophy. They take the case of Okinawa, whose population rank at the top in terms of life expectancy: they believe that hara hachi bun me assists in keeping the average Okinawan's BMI low, and this is thought to be due to the delay in the stomach stretch receptors that help signal satiety. The result of not practising hara hachi bun me is a constant stretching of the stomach which in turn increases the amount of food needed to feel full.

Yoshida Iwase and colleagues have investigated the reasons why some centenarians are able to reach such old ages without signs of dementia, and among other factors, found that following the hara hachi bun me philosophy might contribute to healthier neurological markers for the elderly.

== Okinawans ==
Okinawans are a minority culture who, although part of Japan, are descendants of the Ryukyuan Kingdom and who had influences from mainland China. Okinawa has the world's highest proportion of centenarians, at approximately 50 per 100,000 people. They are known to practise hara hachi bun me, and as a result they typically consume about 1,800 to 1,900 kilo-calories per day. The typical body mass index (BMI) of their elders is about 18 to 22, compared to a typical BMI of 26 or 27 for adults over 60 years of age in the United States.

== In other cultures ==
The philosophy of hara hachi bun me, is also found in other cultures.

=== China ===
A proverb found in Traditional Chinese Medicine states: "Chīfàn qī fēn bǎo, sān fēn han" (吃飯七分飽、三分寒) or "only eat 7 parts full, and wear 3 parts less.")

=== Middle East ===
The principle of avoiding surfeit also appears in Islam, dating back to the 7th century CE by the Prophet Muhammad, embodied in the proverb stating: "you should fill one third of the stomach with liquid, another third with food, and leave the rest empty."

== Influence ==
=== Zen philosophy ===
In the 1965 book Three Pillars of Zen, the author quotes Hakuun Yasutani in his lecture for zazen beginners advising his students about the book Zazen Yojinki (Precautions to Observe in Zazen), written circa 1300, advised them to eat no more than eighty percent of their capacity, reinforced by the proverb hara hachi bun me.

=== American culture ===
Hara hachi bun me was popularised in the United States by a variety of modern books on diet and longevity.

== See also ==
- Calorie restriction
- Mitahara
- Okinawa diet
