= Okinawa diet =

Eating habits of the indigenous people of the Ryukyu Islands

Map of Ryukyu Islands.

The Okinawa diet describes the traditional dietary practices of indigenous people of the Ryukyu Islands (belonging to Japan), which were claimed to have contributed to their relative longevity over a period of study in the 20th century.

== Relative longevity ==
As assessed over 1949 to 1998, people from the Ryukyu Islands (of which Okinawa is the largest) had a life expectancy among the highest in the world (83.8 years vs. 78.9 years in the United States), although the male life expectancy rank among Japanese prefectures plummeted in the 21st century.

Okinawa had the longest life expectancy in all prefectures of Japan for almost 30 years prior to 2000. The relative life expectancy of Okinawans has since declined, due to many factors including Westernization. In 2000, Okinawa dropped in its ranking for longevity advantage for men to 26th out of 47 within the prefectures of Japan.

Although there are myriad factors that could account for differences in life expectancy, calorie restriction and regular physical activity could be the main ones. People have promoted the "Okinawa diet", despite the fact that the diet alone is unlikely to solely explain high life expectancy among seniors on Okinawa in the 20th century.

== Indigenous islanders' diet ==
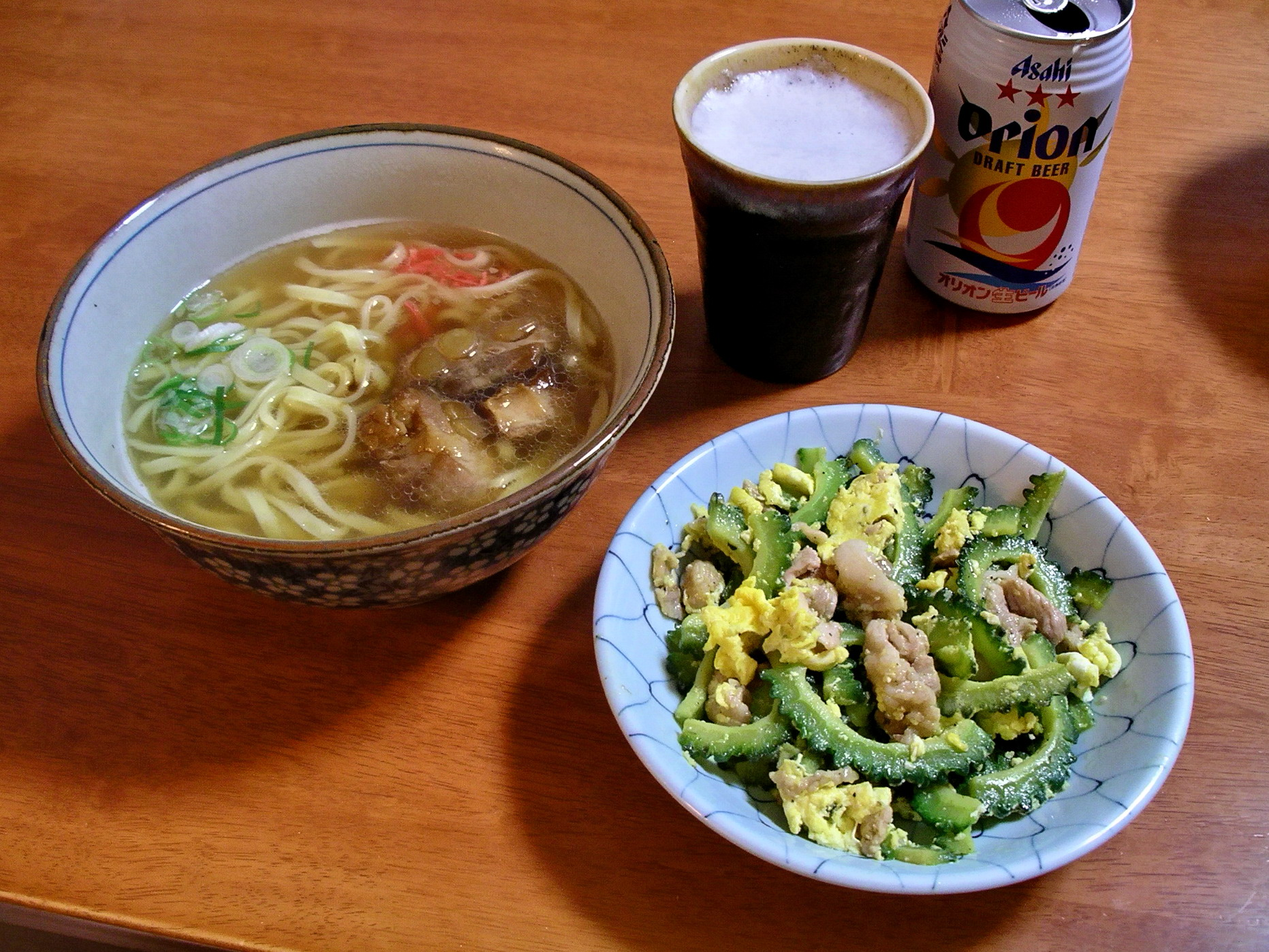
The plate to the right is the national dish, gōyā chanpurū, made with bitter melon known as goyain.

The traditional diet of the islanders contained sweet potato, green-leafy or root vegetables, and soy foods, such as miso soup, tofu or other soy preparations, occasionally served with small amounts of fish, noodles, or lean meats, all cooked with herbs, spices, and oil. Although the traditional Japanese diet usually includes large quantities of rice, the traditional Okinawa diet consisted of smaller quantities of rice; instead the staple was sweet potato. The Okinawa diet had only 30% of the sugar and 15% of the grains of the average Japanese dietary intake.

Okinawan cuisine consists of smaller meal portions of green and yellow vegetables, soy and other legumes, relatively small amounts of rice compared to mainland Japan, as well as occasional fish and pork. The center of the Okinawan cuisine is the sweet potato. Not only is the sweet potato tuber used but so are the leaves from the plant.

=== Food proportions ===
The dietary intake of Okinawans compared to other Japanese circa 1950 shows that Okinawans consumed: fewer total calories (1785 vs. 2068), less polyunsaturated fat (4.8% of calories vs. 8%), less rice (154g vs. 328g), significantly less wheat, barley and other grains (38g vs. 153g), less sugars (3g vs. 8g), more legumes (71g vs. 55g), significantly less fish (15g vs. 62g), significantly less meat and poultry (3g vs. 11g), less eggs (1g vs. 7g), less dairy (<1g vs. 8g), much more sweet potatoes (849g vs. 66g), less other potatoes (2g vs. 47g), less fruit (<1g vs. 44g), and no pickled vegetables (0g vs. 42g). As proportions of total caloric intake, foods in the traditional Okinawa diet included sweet potato (69%), rice (12%), other grains (7%), legumes including soy (6%), green and yellow vegetables (3%), refined oils (2%), fish (1%) and seaweed, meat (mostly pork), refined sugars, potato, egg, nuts and seeds, dairy and fruit (all <1%). Specifically, the Okinawans circa 1950 ate sweet potatoes for 849 grams of the total 1262 grams of food that they consumed, which constituted 69% of their total daily calories.

The traditional Okinawan diet as described above was widely practiced on the islands until about the 1960s. Since then, dietary practices shifted towards Western and mainland Japanese patterns, with fat intake rising from about 6% to 27% of total caloric intake and the sweet potato being supplanted with rice and bread.

Another low-calorie staple in Okinawa was seaweed, such as wakame. Seaweed and tofu in one form or other were eaten on a daily basis.

Okinawans ate three grams total of meat – including pork and poultry – per day, substantially less than the 11-gram average of Japanese as a whole in 1950. The pig's feet, ears, and stomach were considered as everyday foodstuffs. In 1979 after many years of Westernization, the quantity of pork consumption per person a year in Okinawa was 7.9 kg (17 lb), exceeding by about 50% that of the Japanese national average.

=== Okinawan health ===
In addition to their relative longevity identified in the mid-20th century, islanders were noted for their low mortality from cardiovascular disease and certain types of cancers. One study compared age-adjusted mortality of Okinawans versus Americans and found that, during 1995, an average Okinawan was 8 times less likely to die from coronary artery disease, 7 times less likely to die from prostate cancer, 6.5 times less likely to die from breast cancer, and 2.5 times less likely to die from colon cancer than an average American of the same age, though more than 10% of the Okinawans suffered from cheilosis from a low consumption of vitamin B2. Delayed menstruation and deficient lactation were also relatively frequent at 9% and almost 18% due to low caloric intake and/or low body fat levels in women. In the 21st century, the shifting dietary trend coincided with a decrease in longevity, where Okinawans actually developed a lower life expectancy than the Japanese average.

Overall, the traditional Okinawa diet led to little weight gain with age, low body mass index throughout life, and low risk from age-related disease. No ingredients or foods of any kind have been scientifically shown to possess antiaging properties.

== Research ==
In the 1972 Japan National Nutrition Survey, it was determined that Okinawan adults consumed 83% of what Japanese adults did and that Okinawan children consumed 62% of what Japanese children consumed. Since the early 2000s, the difference in life expectancy between Okinawan and mainland Japanese decreased, possibly due to Westernization and erosion of the traditional diet. The spread of primarily American fast-food chains was linked with an increase in cardiovascular diseases, much like the ones noted in Japanese migrants to the United States.

== Culture and customs ==
Okinawa and Japan have food-centered cultures. Festivities often include food or are food-based. Moreover, the food tends to be seasonal, fresh and raw. Portion sizes are small and meals are brought out in stages that starts with appetizers, many main courses including sashimi (raw fish) and suimono (soup), sweets and tea. The food culture and presentation is preserved, passing low-calorie food from generation to generation.

== See also ==
- Calorie restriction
- Hara hachi bun me
- List of diets
- Okinawan cuisine
- Mediterranean diet

== Bibliography ==
- Albala, Ken, ed. (2011). Food cultures of the world encyclopedia. Santa Barbara, Calif.: Greenwood. ISBN 9780313376276.
