= Abura-zōmen =

Traditional noodle dish from the Amami Islands

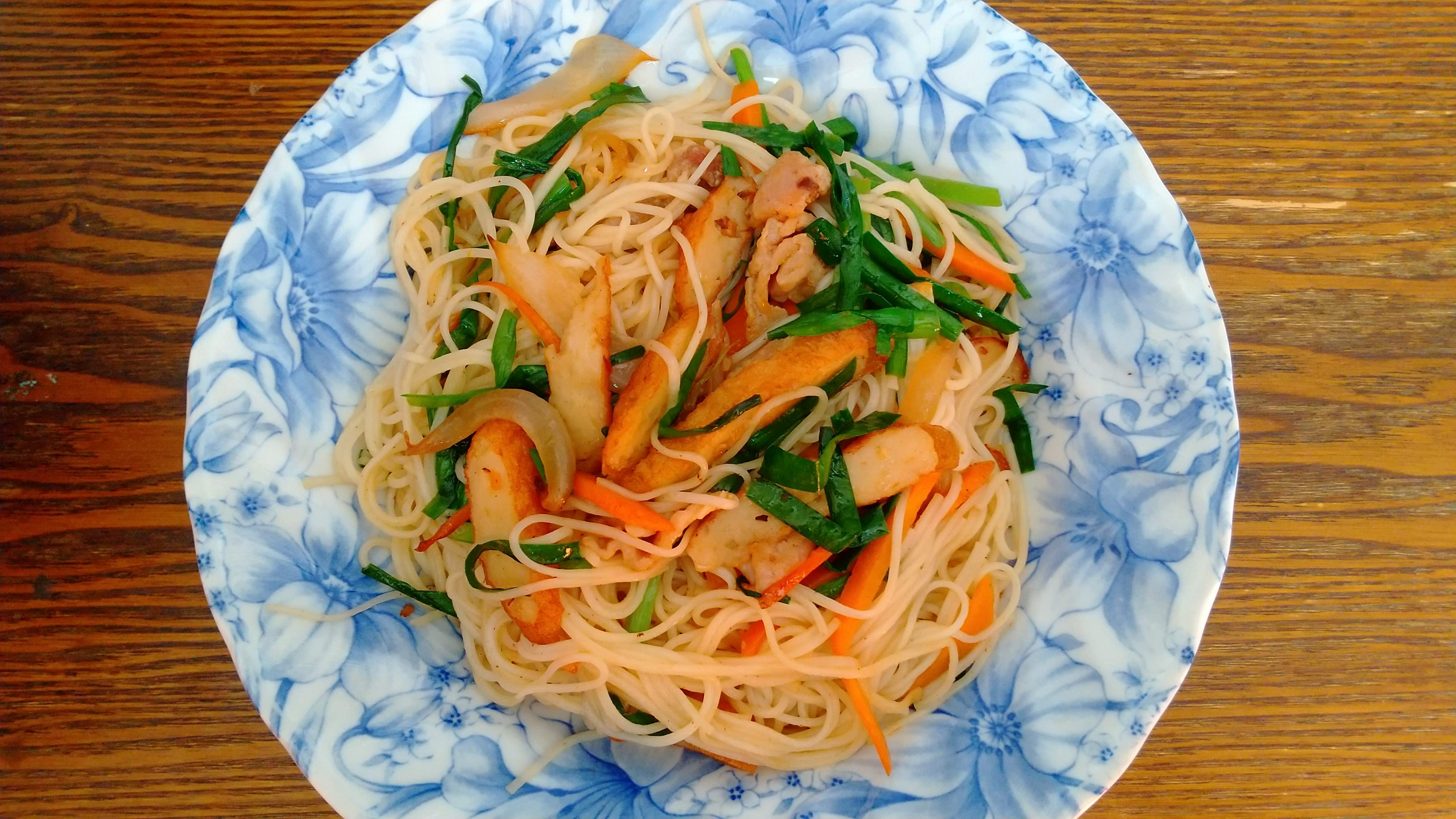
Abura-zōmen

Abura-zōmen (油ゾーメン) (Northern Amami-Oshima: アブラゾームィ゜ン, Abura-zōmïn, Yoron: アブラソーミヌ, Abura-sōminu() is a traditional local dish from the Amami Islands in Kagoshima Prefecture (Japan). It is commonly eaten as a home-cooked meal, a casual dish at diners, an item on izakaya menus, or as a light snack in place of sweets.

The dish is made by mixing boiled sōmen noodles with a sauce containing oil, which prevents the noodles from sticking together, giving it a distinctive texture.

== Overview ==
Abura-zōmen is a regional dish from the Amami Islands, made by stir-frying pork, vegetables, and sōmen noodles. While it is similar to Okinawa's sōmin chanpurū (Okinawan: ソーミンチャンプルー), a distinctive feature of abura-zōmen in the Amami region is the addition of dashi broth during the stir-frying process. The emulsion of the stir-frying oil and the broth coats the noodles, giving them a smooth and pleasant texture.

Although wheat was not traditionally cultivated and sōmen production was not local to the Amami region, there are several theories as to why sōmen became widely established there. One theory suggests that sōmen was introduced from Satsuma during the Edo period, and because dried noodles could be preserved for long periods, they became a common food in Amami. However, the exact origin remains uncertain.

Due to its simplicity, abura-zōmen is still widely prepared in ordinary households in the region today. Many restaurants specializing in regional cuisine proudly serve abura-zōmen, reinforcing its deep cultural roots. It has become a popular dish not only among locals but also among travelers from outside the prefecture.

During celebrations, rice planting and harvesting, and other occasions where large groups of people gathered, abura-zōmen was commonly prepared. It is considered an essential dish, particularly during the hachigwachi uduri (Northern Amami-Oshima: 八月踊) festival held in the Amami Islands.

Hachigwachi uduri involves singing and dancing to dozens of different songs unique to each village, expressing gratitude to the gods and praying for a good harvest. Since many people gather for the festival, it is customary to serve abura-zōmen in large platters for everyone to share.

== Preparation ==
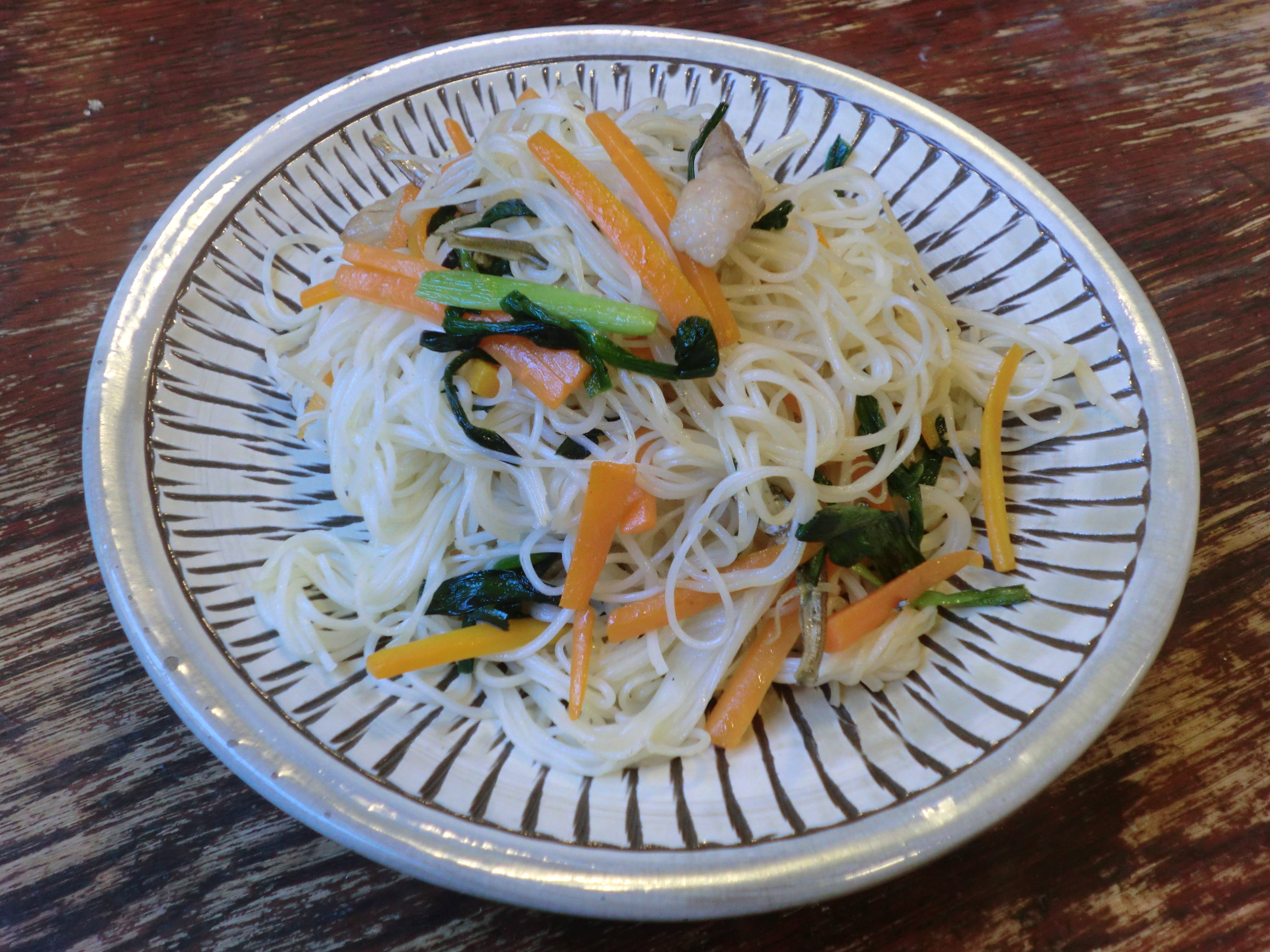
Abura-zōmen

Ingredients: pork, sōmen, garlic chives, dried anchovies, dashi broth.

First, thinly sliced pork is stir-fried in oil. Then, dried anchovies and boiled sōmen are added, and dashi broth is poured over the mixture. Once the oil and dashi emulsify, garlic chives are added, and the flavor is adjusted with soy sauce and other seasonings. It is ideal to leave a small amount of broth remaining in the dish.

The type and amount of dashi broth can vary depending on the region, household, or restaurant. In some cases, chicken broth similar to that used in keihan is employed, while others use broth made from silver-stripe round herring (kibinago, キビナゴ). Additionally, some versions are made with less broth for a drier finish, whereas others are served with more broth, resembling nyūmen (にゅうめん).

In terms of ingredients, besides garlic chives, various locally available vegetables may also be included.

== See also ==
- Okinawan cuisine
