= Ui Nema =

Japanese VTuber from Okinawa Prefecture

- Ui Nema, as designed by Cafu Te
- Occupation: VTuber
- Organization: Okinawa Club (Ashibi Company)

YouTube information
- Channel: Ui Nema Channel
- Years active: 2019–present
- Genres: Live streaming, travel documentary
- Subscribers: 116 thousand
- Views: 14 million
- Last updated: September 17, 2026
- Website: okinawaclub.jp/nemaui/

Ui Nema (Japanese: 根間うい; also Nema Ui or NemaUi) is a Japanese VTuber from Okinawa Prefecture. She is a member of the Okinawa Club, a VTuber agency owned by the Naha-based Ashibi Company. She debuted on March 22, 2019, and has grown popular in her native Okinawa, collaborating with local government agencies to promote tourism in the prefecture. Her live streams accordingly focus on aspects of Ryukyuan culture and local tourist attractions. She has also appeared on local television shows, voice acted in anime series, and covered music.

== Overview ==
Ui Nema's character model was designed by Cafu Te of the Ashibi Company, an entertainment company based in Okinawa's prefectural capital Naha. The given name Ui is derived from the Japanese words uiuishii (初々しい) and kawaii (可愛い), meaning "innocent" and "cute", respectively. The surname Nema originates from Miyako Island.

Ui Nema's live streams and videos focus on aspects of Ryukyuan culture, such as local cuisine and tourist attractions. She hosted her first live stream on March 22, 2019.

== Appearances outside of YouTube ==
Ui Nema starred in her own television show on Okinawa Television, which aired every Sunday evening from October 4 to December 27, 2020, for a total of 13 episodes. She has also appeared on several other shows on the network.

The Okinawa National Tax Office appointed Ui Nema as the official ambassador for its mobile tax returns and cashless payment services for the 2021 tax return period.

Japan Post released a set of stamps featuring Ui Nema on March 4, 2022. Availability was limited to three post offices in Naha.

Ui Nema served as the chief of Naha Police Station for one day on December 20, 2022. She called for an end to drunk driving, occurrences of which typically spike in Okinawa during New Year celebrations.

Okinawa's prefectural police appointed Ui Nema as a public relations officer on January 29, 2025. She expressed her enthusiasm, saying she was "happy and honoured" by the appointment and that her focus would be on crime prevention and road safety. Okinawa police chief Tanaka Mami responded in kind, saying: "With Ms. Nema's cooperation, I think a wide range of age groups will listen to what we have to say. I hope that she will contribute greatly to the realisation of a safe and secure Okinawa."
