= Sabani boat =

Type of traditional sailing boat in Japan

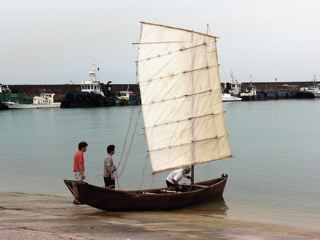
Sabani

Sabani (サバニ, 鱶舟) is the name of a traditional type of boat that has long been used in Okinawa and other parts of the Nansei Islands, as well as throughout the Kyushu region of Japan.

== Overview ==
Sabani (サバニ) is a type of small sailing vessel that has been traditionally used in the southern regions of Japan, including the Ryukyu Islands (Okinawa), the Sakishima Islands, and Kyushu.

In Okinawa, it is closely associated with local fishermen, known as Uminchu (海人), and was commonly used for catching large fish such as sharks. Beyond its role in fishing, the sabani was also widely used by ordinary people for transportation. Despite its modest appearance, the vessel is seaworthy and capable of navigating open waters, making it an essential means of inter-island travel and a valuable tool for trade in southern Japan.

Even today, sabani boats continue to play a role in Okinawan and Kyushu culture. They are used in traditional boat races such as Hari (ハーリー), featured in tourism experiences, and occasionally owned by private individuals for recreational purposes, preserving a living tradition.

== History ==
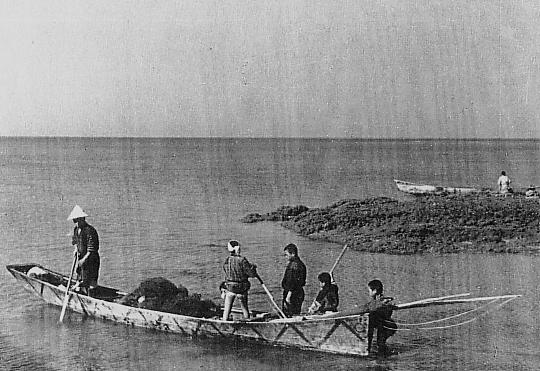
Sabani

In the Ryukyu Islands, dugout canoes were once commonly built. According to Takara Kurayoshi, professor emeritus at the University of the Ryukyus, the sabani developed as a result of the Ryukyu Kingdom's encouragement of hagi-bune—boats constructed by joining wooden planks—in an effort to preserve local forests.

In Itoman City, it is traditionally believed that the name sabani derives from the combination of saba (a local word for shark) and nni (meaning boat). Originally designed to chase sharks for the collection of shark fins, the sabani evolved into a maneuverable, fast vessel capable of navigating shallow waters with reefs and coral.

Its thick keel and thin sides made it suitable for hauling fish caught in nets and gave it excellent stability and recoverability in case of swaying or capsizing. Before World War II, sabani builders from Okinawa even traveled to Japanese-administered islands such as Saipan, where they helped spread a variation known as the South Seas Sabani (南洋サバニ).

The sabani also appears in historical accounts such as the story of the Hisamatsu Go-yūshi ("Five Brave Men of Hisamatsu"), who are said to have rowed a sabani from Miyako Island to Ishigaki Island to report the sighting of the Russian Baltic Fleet during the Russo-Japanese War.

== Boatbuilding Techniques ==
Detailed analysis of the sabani's hull design and boatbuilding techniques can be found in 沖縄の舟サバニ (1985) by Katsuhiko Shiraishi, published by the Shiraishi Residential Design Studio. While the sabani transitioned into a plank-built (hagi-bune) boat after the Meiji era, it still retains characteristics of the earlier dugout style (kuri-bune), as is common with many traditional Japanese wooden boats. Its long, narrow hull enables higher speeds while also providing good resistance to lateral rolling. However, the sabani is also known for its lack of overall stability and is relatively easy to capsize.

The sabani was also structurally adapted to endure storms by allowing the vessel to partially submerge, thus riding out rough seas. After the storm, the boat could be righted and bailed out. Its flat bottom was designed for safe navigation in lagoon and reef environments. The paddle, known as eeku, was traditionally made from mokkokku (Michelia compressa), a wood suited to the salinity and buoyancy of seawater, and valued for its strength and durability.

Although there are historical records indicating the existence of double-hulled boats in the Kerama Islands near Okinawa, the sabani is generally a single-hulled vessel and does not feature outriggers. However, it was not uncommon to temporarily lash multiple sabani together for the transport of heavy cargo, according to Akiko Deguchi's Marukibune.

The sabani is equipped with battens known as fūzan for adjusting the shape of the sail, and the position of the mast can also be finely adjusted. In the case of wooden sabani, shark liver oil was sometimes applied to the hull to enhance resistance to rot. Additionally, sails were dyed using pig's blood to reduce permeability and increase their ability to catch the wind.
