= Hachigatsu Odori =

Ryukyuan traditional dance performance

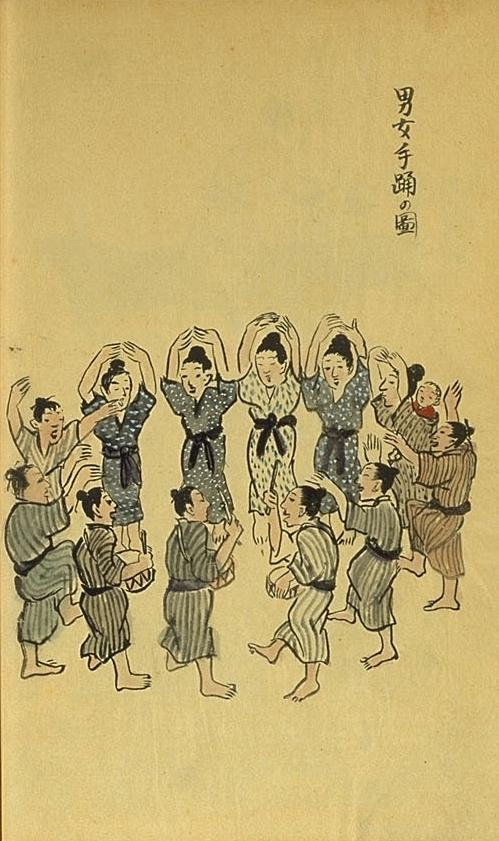
Hachigatsu Odori

Hachigatsu Odori (八月踊り, Amami:Hachigwacï uduri, Ie dialect:Patigwatsi wudui; lit. "Eighth Month Dance") are Ryukyuan traditional dances performed during the eighth month of the lunar calendar to celebrate the harvest of agricultural crops.

The exact schedule varies from village to village, but traditionally, the dance would take place over several days, sometimes continuing through the night, with participants visiting and performing at every household in the community, dancing in streets and gardens.

Today, the custom has often been simplified, with dances typically held in a central open space within the village.

== Overview ==
In Amami Ōshima (奄美大島), a festival called Kōso-sai (考祖祭) is held every year during the eighth month of the lunar calendar. During this festival, Sekihan (赤飯) is cooked with newly harvested rice and offered at a shrine as a prayer and expression of gratitude for a bountiful harvest.

The festival is held three times during the eighth month. The first occasion is called Arasetsu (新節) and takes place on the first hinoe day (丙の日). The second is called Shibasashi (柴挿) and is held on the kinoe day (甲の日), nine days after the first. The third is called Donga (嫩芽) and occurs on the kōshi day (甲子の日) later in the month. Together, these events are collectively referred to as Mi-hachigatsu (三八月).

It is said that the kōshi day is also the day when cats give birth, symbolizing fertility. On this day, people of all ages form a procession visiting each house, creating a circle in the garden, lighting a bonfire in the center, singing songs, beating drums, synchronizing their steps, and performing hand dances. During this event, they sing lyrics such as: Kono Tonochi (この殿内), Oniwa (御庭), Niwa hiro-sa yashi ga, Oniwa katahashi ni, Iwaite osero (transl. "This estate, this garden, although it is wide, we celebrate at the edge of the garden").

Before Donga, children build small huts made of wood and straw, offering white sake to the rice field gods. These huts are called shichiyagama (しちやがま; lit. "festival huts"). During the festival, participants climb onto rooftops, take white sake into their mouths, and blow it out three times to perform a purification ritual.

After the festival ends, the huts are dismantled by shaking them apart from the rooftops. Additionally, on the night of the fifteenth day of the eighth month (Jugoya), people dress in festive clothing, share meals, and wait for the moonrise. Once the moon rises, they perform hand dances, sumo matches, and tug-of-war contests, staying up through the night before returning home the next morning.

== See also ==
- Okinawan festivals and observances
