= Hari (Japanese sport) =

Traditional boat racing event in Japan

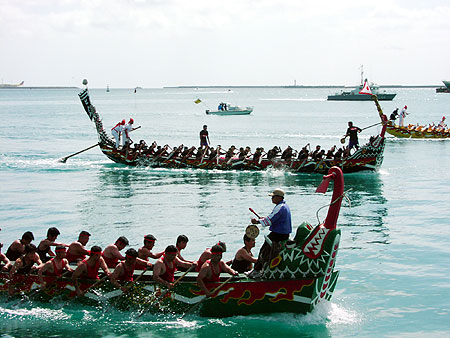
Naha Hari

Hari (ハーリー, hārī), Haarii, Bari, Hare or Harley, is a traditional boat racing event held in Ryukyu Islands and parts of Mainland Japan(Kyushu). The races are conducted to pray for maritime safety and bountiful catches. Participants compete by rowing boats, with the type of boat varying by region and event. Commonly used vessels include the sabani and the hariusen.

== History ==
The tradition of Hari in Okinawa dates back several centuries. It is believed to have been practiced as early as the 15th century in areas around present-day Tomigusuku. Originally, Hari emerged as a maritime ritual performed by fishermen to pray for safe voyages and abundant fishing. Over time, it developed unique regional forms across fishing villages and harbors. Since the 1970s, it has also become a tourist attraction. Today, Hari is held throughout many areas of Ryukyu Islands—from the southern to the northern parts of the main island, including remote islands—as well as in Mainland Japan(Kyushu), and is regarded as a key annual event for local communities.

== Boats and competition formats ==
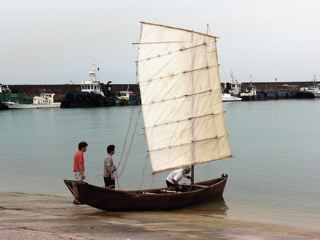
Sabani

=== Ryukyu Islands ===
- Sabani: A traditional wooden fishing boat known for its light weight and stability in rough seas. It typically accommodates 5 to 10 rowers and is predominantly used in northern areas such as Nakijin, Motobu, and Kin Town.
- Hariusen: A large and elaborately decorated boat, used mainly in Naha and Itoman. These vessels are over 14 meters in length and typically carry 30 to 40 rowers. They are adorned with dragon heads and tails.

==== Competition format ====
Teams range from 5 to 40 members. Events often include both ritualistic races (Ugan Bari, held as a religious offering) and competitive races (Hon Bari). Tourist-oriented experience races and children’s races are frequently held alongside the main events.

=== Mainland Japan ===
- Péiron boats: Long boats that carry over 20 rowers, commonly used in Nagasaki Port for summer Péiron festivals. Races are conducted over a 1,150-meter course at full speed. Similar to Okinawa, these races integrate religious rituals and festival traditions.

== Major event locations ==
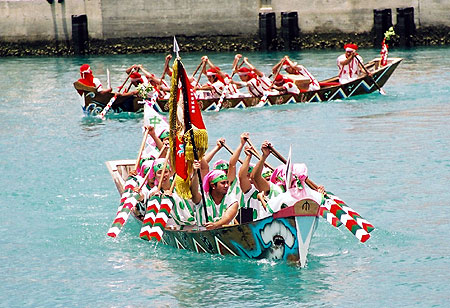
Itoman Hari

=== Ryukyu Islands ===
Amami Islands

- Amami Islands, Kagoshima Prefecture: Influenced by Okinawan culture, some communities in this region continue to hold traditional boat racing events.

Central and Northern Okinawa

- Chatan Town – Nirai Hari: Held around the 4th day of the 5th lunar month at Hamagawa Fishing Port. Multiple categories are featured, including workplace teams, women’s teams, and children’s teams.
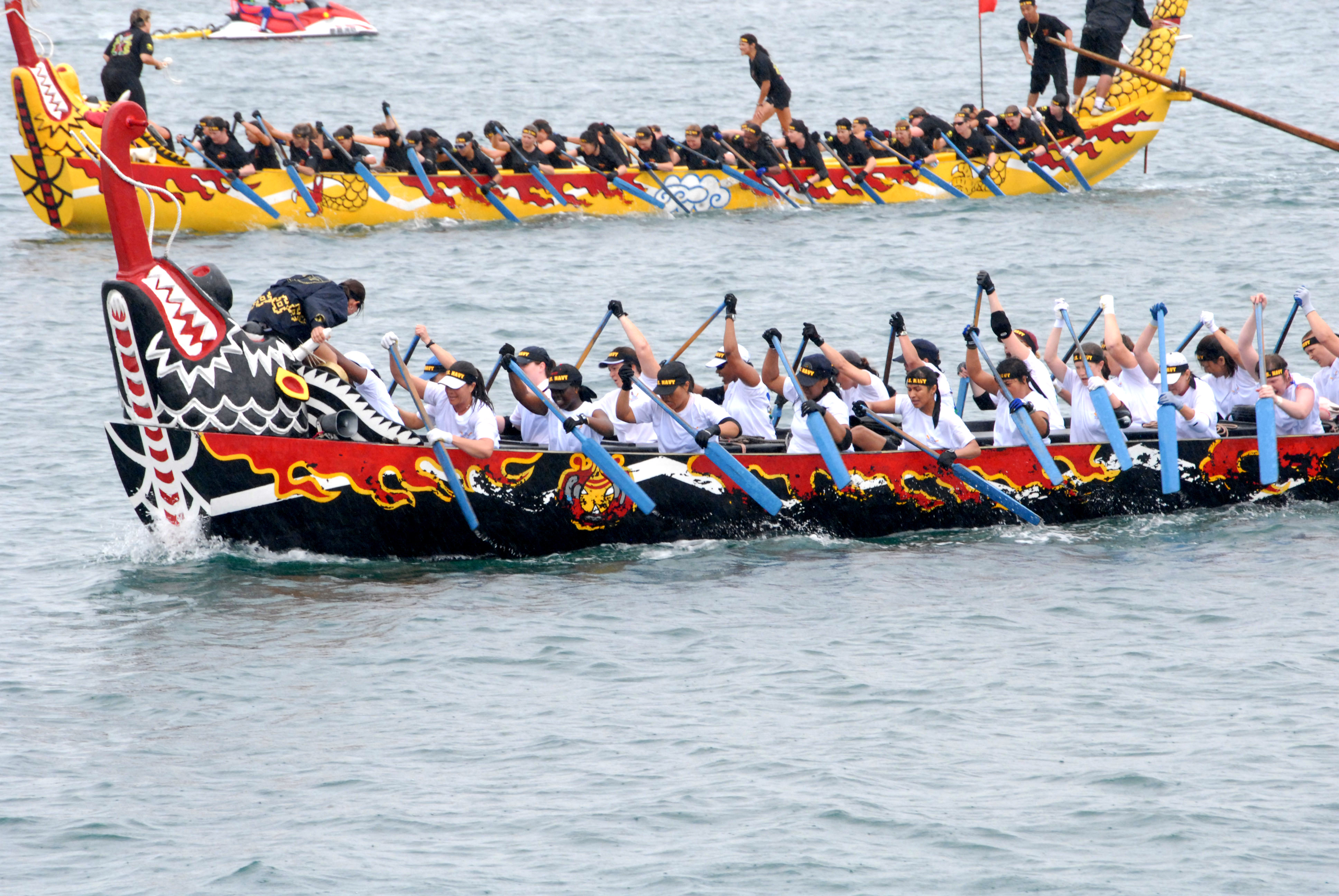
  Naha Hari
- Nago City – All-Island Hari Tournament: A large-scale event held every August, with participation from over 180 teams.
- Kin Town, Nakijin Village, Motobu Town, Onna Village: Traditional events held between June and July, in conjunction with local sea deity festivals.

Southern Okinawa Main Island

- Naha City – Naha Hari: Held annually from May 3 to 5 at Naha Port. It is the largest Hari event in Okinawa and is also a well-established tourist attraction.
- Itoman City – Itoman Hari: A traditional event held on the 4th day of the 5th lunar month. Unique local rituals include the Agai Subu (departure ceremony) and Kunnukase (capsizing race).

=== Mainland Japan ===
Kyushu

- Nagasaki City – Nagasaki Péiron Championship: Held in late July at Nagasaki Port. Similar Péiron festivals are held in Omura and Sasebo, with local teams from companies, schools, and neighborhood associations.

== Etymology ==
The exact origin of the term Hari is unclear. It is thought to derive from the concept of boats that "crawl" or move smoothly across the water (ha meaning "to crawl"). In some areas, the chant "Hari-yōi!"—used during races—became synonymous with the event itself. While Hari shares origins with the dragon boat races of southern China, it has developed independently in Okinawa and Kyushu into a distinctive form of regional folk tradition, with less emphasis on its Chinese roots.
