= Kin, Okinawa =

Kin 金武町
- Town
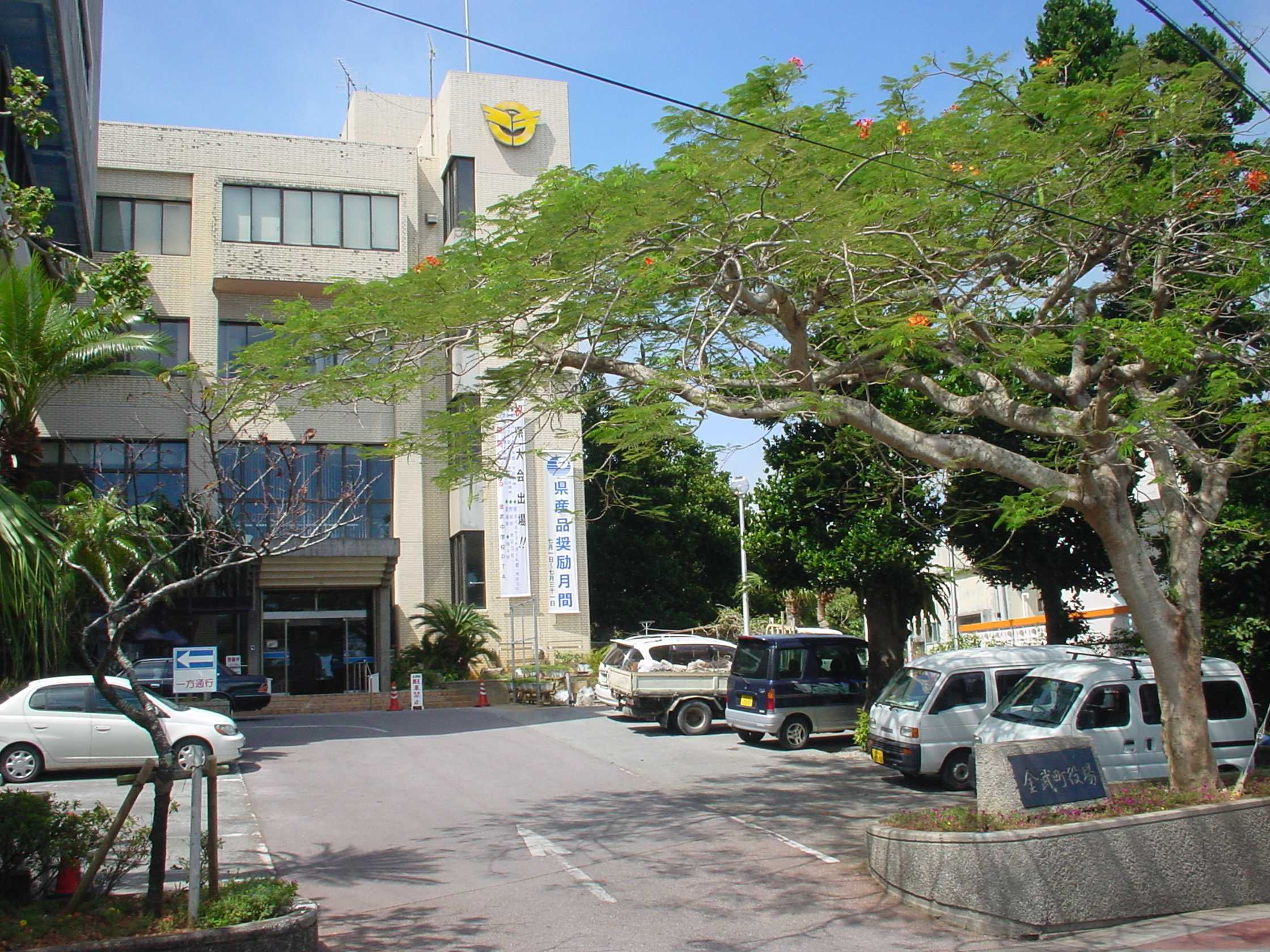
- Kin Town Office

- Flag Emblem

- Location of Kin in Okinawa Prefecture

- Location in Japan
- Coordinates: 26°27′22″N 127°55′34″E
- Country: Japan
- Region: Kyushu
- Prefecture: Okinawa Prefecture
- District: Kunigami

Area
  - Total: 37.57 km^{2} (14.51 sq mi)

Population (October 1, 2020)
  - Total: 10,806
  - Density: 287.6/km^{2} (744.9/sq mi)
- Time zone: UTC+09:00 (JST)
- City hall address: 1 Aza Kin, Kin-cho, Kunigami-gun; 904-1201
- Website: www.town.kin.okinawa.jp (in Japanese)
- Symbols
- Flower: Sakura
- Tree: Chinese fan palm

Kin (Japanese: 金武町, Hepburn: Kin-chō; Kunigami and Okinawan: Chin) is a town located in Kunigami District, Okinawa Prefecture, Japan.

On 1 October 2020, the town had an estimated population of 10,806 and a density of 290 persons per km^{2}. The total area of Kin is 37.57 square kilometres (14.51 mi^{2}). 59% of the land area of Kin remains under control of the United States military, the highest percentage of any municipality in Okinawa Prefecture. The population of the town is concentrated on a strip of land on the coast of Kin Bay. Kin is home to Camp Hansen, a military base of the United States Marines, as well as other smaller military installations.

Kin is home to the Dragon Brand of awamori, with a Buddhist shrine built in 1522, and a 270-meter natural cave known as Kin Shonyudo that doubles as both a place of worship and a cellar for aging bottles of the drink. Kin is also claimed to be the origin of taco rice, a dish emblematic of modern Okinawan cuisine.

== Geography ==
Kin is located at the middle of Okinawa Island, and is roughly triangular in shape. The town is roughly 13 kilometres (8.1 mi) long from east to west. From north to south the town ranges between 2 kilometres (1.2 mi) to 8 kilometres (5.0 mi) at its widest point, measured from Būtodake in Camp Hansen to the tip of Cape Kin.

=== Administrative divisions ===
Kin is divided into five wards.

- Kin (金武区, Kin-ku) serves as the central business and administrative district of the town. 50% of the population of the town lives in the ward. The main gate of Camp Hansen is located in the Kin ward, and consequently, businesses that cater to the population of the base are located within the ward.
- Namisato (並里区, Namisato-ku), along with Kin ward, forms the most populated parts of the town.
- Nakagawa (中川区, Nakagawa-ku) is the northernmost ward in the town, and borders the village of Ginoza. Nakagawa is the most agricultural part of Kin.
- Igei (伊芸区, Igei-ku) is largely base land. 80% of the ward is used by the United States military; the remainder of the land is agricultural, and is used for rice production.
- Yaka (屋嘉区, Yaka-ku) sits in the south of Kin on the border of the city of Uruma. Some of the hilly areas of Yaka have been developed for agriculture.

=== Neighboring municipalities ===
- Ginoza
- Onna
- Uruma

== Government ==
Kin is governed from the Kin Town Office in the central district of the town, also known as Kin. The municipal Board of Education oversees the middle school, three elementary schools, three nursery school, and other community facilities in the town. The Kin Municipal Assembly consists of 16 members who serve a four-year term, and are led by a chairperson and vice-chairperson.

The Okinawa Prefecture Police provides law enforcement for Kin; the town has no municipal police service. The Ishikawa Police Station, located in nearby Uruma, covers Kin, as well as the town of Onna, Ginoza, and the Ishikawa area of Uruma.

== Education ==
The municipal schools are:

- Kin Junior High School (金武中学校)
- Kagei Elementary School (嘉芸小学校)
- Kin Elementary School (金武小学校)
- Nakagawa Elementary School (中川小学校)

== Noted places ==
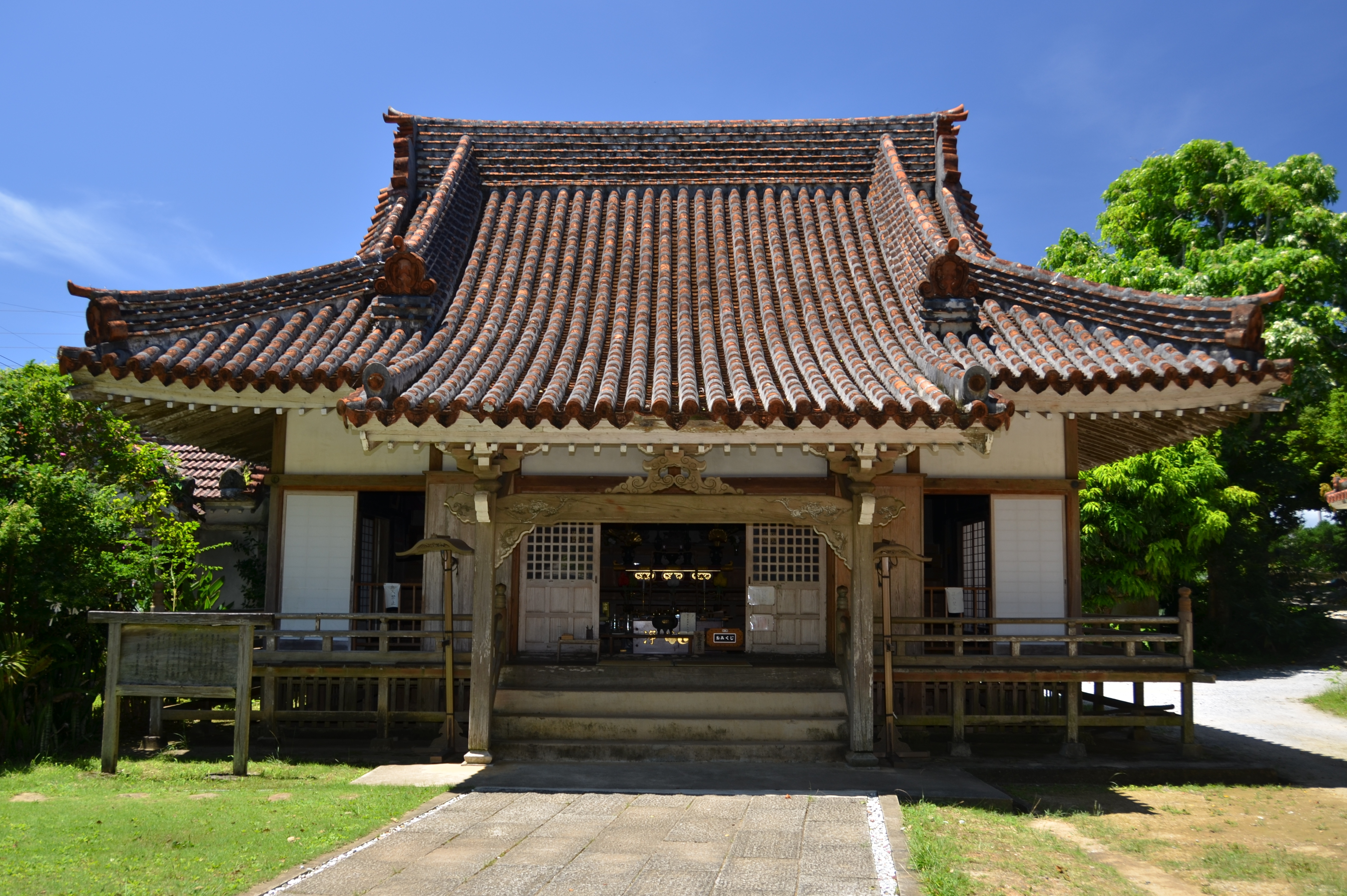
Kin Kannon-ji

Kin is home to the Kin Kannon-ji, a Buddhist temple that traces its history to the 16th century. By tradition the temple was constructed by Nisshō Shōnin, a resident of Ise who was attempting to travel to China. Nisshō Shōnin was shipwrecked in the Ryukyu Islands, and took refuge at the small port of Funaya in Kin. There he founded the temple. The hondō main hall of the temple was reconstructed in 1942. Unlike most structures in southern Okinawa Island, it was not destroyed in the Battle of Okinawa. The wooden structure is designated an important cultural property by the Town of Kin. The temple additionally serves as a site for the display of traditional handicrafts, festivals, and performances.

== Cultural Properties ==
- Name (Japanese) (Type of registration)

=== Cultural Properties ===
- Bell from the former Tenkaizen-ji temple (梵鐘(旧天界禅寺鐘)) (Prefectural)
- Kan'non-ji Temple (観音寺) (Municipal)
- Tōyama Memorial Museum (當山紀念館) (National)

=== Folk Cultural Properties ===
- Magatama, kanzashi, and old documents (Kin Noro's sacred implements) (勾玉・簪・古文書 (金武ノロ神具)) (Municipal)
- Theatrical costumes of Yaka (屋嘉の芸能衣装) (Municipal)
- Yaka Ufukā spring (屋嘉のウフカー) (Municipal)

=== Historic Sites ===
- Former Okukubi-gawa Bridge (旧億首橋) (Municipal)
- Kinta-gā Spring (慶武田川 (キンタガー)) (Municipal)
- Kin Ukka-gā (ウッカガー (金武大川)) (Municipal)
- "Monument to the Loyal Dead" of the Former Kin Village (旧金武村の忠魂碑) (Municipal)
- Nakoo-gā Spring (ナコオガーのイズミ (名古川の泉)) (Municipal)
- Sā-ga Spring (茶 川 (サーガ)) (Municipal)
- Sukumui Utaki (Iri Utaki) Sacred Site (底森御嶽 (西御嶽)) (Municipal)
- Tumusuzu Utaki Sacred Site (トゥムスズ御嶽) (Municipal)
- Yoribusano Utaki (Agari Utaki) Sacred Site (ヨリブサノ御嶽 (東御嶽)) (Municipal)

=== Natural Monuments ===
- Banyan tree of Igei (伊芸のがじまる) (Municipal)
- Fukugi tree of Kan'non-ji Temple (観音寺のフクギ) (Municipal)
- Sea fig of Hēshinba (拝神場のアコウ) (Municipal)

== United States military bases ==
Kin is home to Camp Hansen (51.4 square kilometres (19.8 mi^{2})), a U.S. Marine Corps base that supports ground combat, communications, 31st MEU(SOC), 7th Communication Battalion, 9th Engineer Support Battalion, 12th Marine Regiment, 3d MEF Headquarters Group, 3 MEF Special Operations Training Group Small Craft Raid Platoon and other battle elements. Historically, Kin is known as an entertainment location for the U.S. Marines stationed there. The number of Marines has drastically been reduced due to most Combat Arms troops(i.e.-Infantry, Tanks and Artillery) being phased out and relocating to Guam.

Of significance is also the changing dynamics of the local population that no longer caters to a Military population like it used to prior to the late 1990s. Most Marines on Camp Hansen tend to stay on base or occasionally traverse to Kadena AFB. Numerous bars have shut down in Kin-ville, now referred to as Kin-Town, due to the noticeable lack of Marines socialising. Also contributing factors include highten curfews and mandatory "Liberty Buddies" for junior enlisted personnel.

After the terrorist attacks of 9/11, Marines from U.S. 3d Marine Division were able to leave directly out of the ports in Kin via HSV Ferry to deploy to other areas in the Far East rather than flying.
