= Ryukyu New Year =

Ryukyuans traditional New Year

Ryukyu New Year (Okinawan and Amami:Sjoogwaci, Kunigami:Soogaci, Yaeyama:ʃoŋgwadzï) is Ryukyuans' traditional New Year. The mainland of Japan fully uses the Gregorian calendar after the Meiji Restoration, but the Ryukyu Islands still celebrate the New Year on the first day of the first month of the Chinese calendar.

== History ==
The Ryukyu Kingdom first created a calendar based on the Shixian calendar in 1674. The lunar calendar plays a very important role in the fishing-dominated Ryukyu Islands because of the need to rely on the moon's rise and fall to predict the tides. When the Meiji government implemented the solar calendar, the Ryukyu people who were dissatisfied with Japanese rule continued to use the lunar calendar. Locals eat soba noodles to celebrate the new year, and at the beginning of the new year, each family sends New Year's cards to each other and a New Year's gift to the children.

== Custom ==
Kudaka Island is known as the "Island of the Gods". According to legend, it is the place where Amamikyu, the creator of Ryukyu, came down from the sky and started the founding of the country. On the day of the Ryukyu New Year, many people on the island will be busy returning home. The outer hall, which serves as the stage, is the two major places of worship on the island, along with the Jiugao hall. At Jiugao Hall, a pair of male islanders take turns to worship, while female goddesses fill their glasses with sake. When the two who have completed the ceremony walk out of the hall, they will perform hand dances to welcome the joy of the new year.

On Hamahiga Island, the legendary Utaki where Amamikyu lived is open during the Ryukyu New Year, with New Year's greetings, performances and dance ceremonies. At the beginning of the new year, the village witch prays for a prosperous year with rice and sweets. Afterwards, Ryukyu classical music was played with Sanshin, drum, flute, etc. When the key changed and the bright sanxian sound reverberated, all the participants began to dance.

The two villages in the north and south of Taketomi Town will hold tug-of-war and wrestling ceremonies on Ryukyu New Year's Day. They are divided into two teams, the north and the south. After singing the folk songs, it starts around 2 pm. The locals believe that "the north wins the livestock and the south wins the harvest". The fishing port in Itoman, the hometown of seafarers, is the most solemn place to celebrate the Ryukyu New Year. A large fishing flag is hung on the moored fishing boats. I hope everyone will have a full year of harvest. A New Year wrestling event is held at the market in Naha.

In Amami Oshima, the Ryukyu New Year is a festival to pray for the abundance of grains and family happiness. During the Ryukyu New Year, people will set up kadomatsu made of pines, bamboos and daphniphyllum, eat mochi soup and sashimi, and drink shochu.

== See also ==
- Okinawan festivals and observances
- Lunar New Year
