= Taco rice =

Popular example of Okinawan cuisine

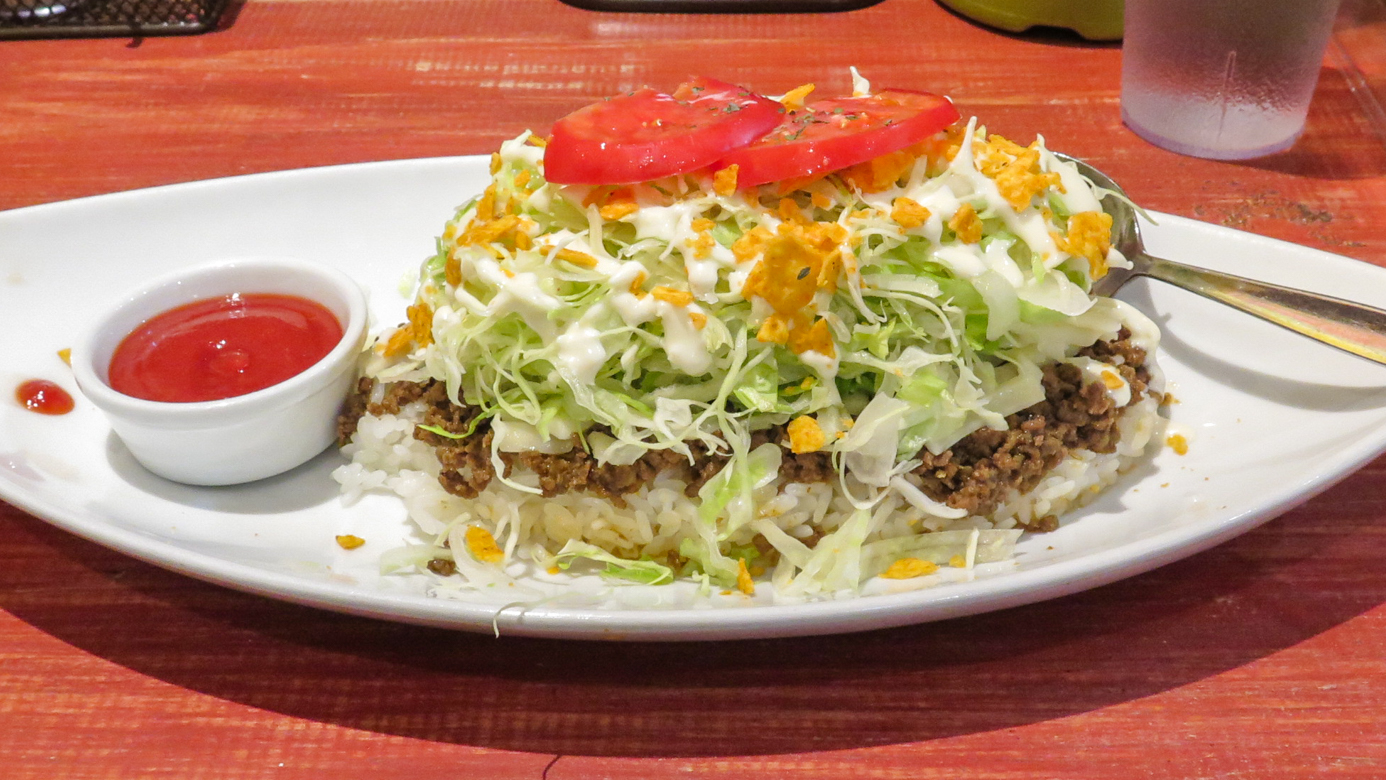
- Taco rice at a restaurant in Chatan, Okinawa
- Place of origin: Japan
- Region or state: Okinawa Prefecture
- Main ingredients: Rice, ground beef, cheese, lettuce, tomato, sauces

Taco rice (タコライス, takoraisu) is a rice dish in modern Okinawan cuisine. It consists of taco-flavored ground beef served on a bed of rice, frequently served with shredded cheese, shredded lettuce, and tomato, topped with salsa.

Charlie's Tacos, serving tacos in shells made from rice flour, had been established in 1956 as the first "taco place" in Okinawa. Taco rice was created in 1984 by Matsuzo Gibo and introduced at two of his cafes, Parlor Senri and King Tacos, located just a minute from the main gate of Camp Hansen in Kin, Okinawa.

Taco rice is a popular dish among U.S. military personnel stationed in Okinawa as lunch or late night food. KFC put it on their menu throughout Japan for a time during the 1990s and Yoshinoya, a nationwide gyūdon restaurant, serves it in the chain's restaurants in Okinawa prefecture. In addition, Taco Bell offers it as a menu option at the chain's restaurant in the Shibuya district of Tokyo.

The Tex-Mex flavor is sometimes replaced by the use of soy sauce, mirin and sake. Occasionally it is served with rice in a tortilla roll.

== Gallery ==
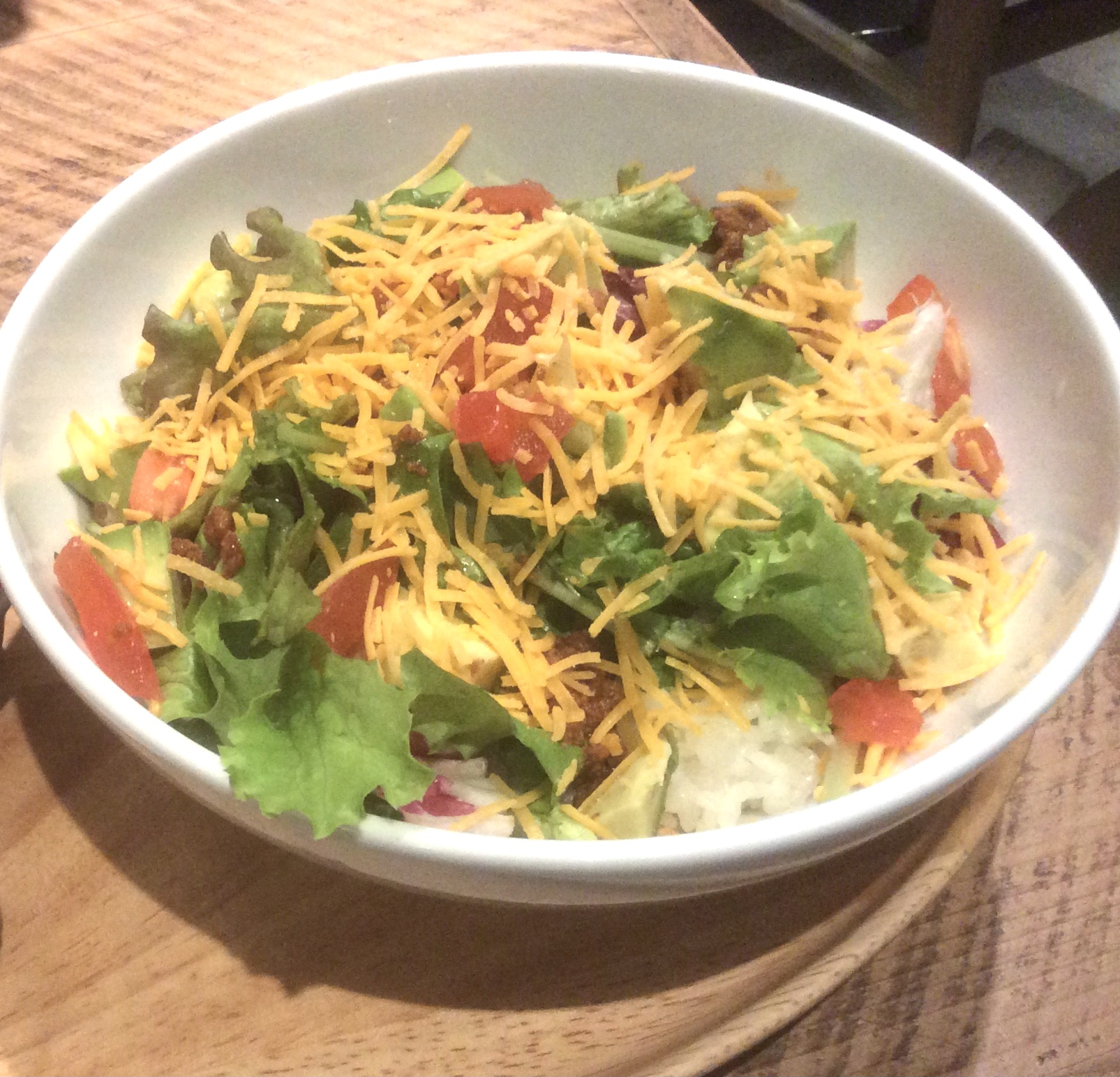

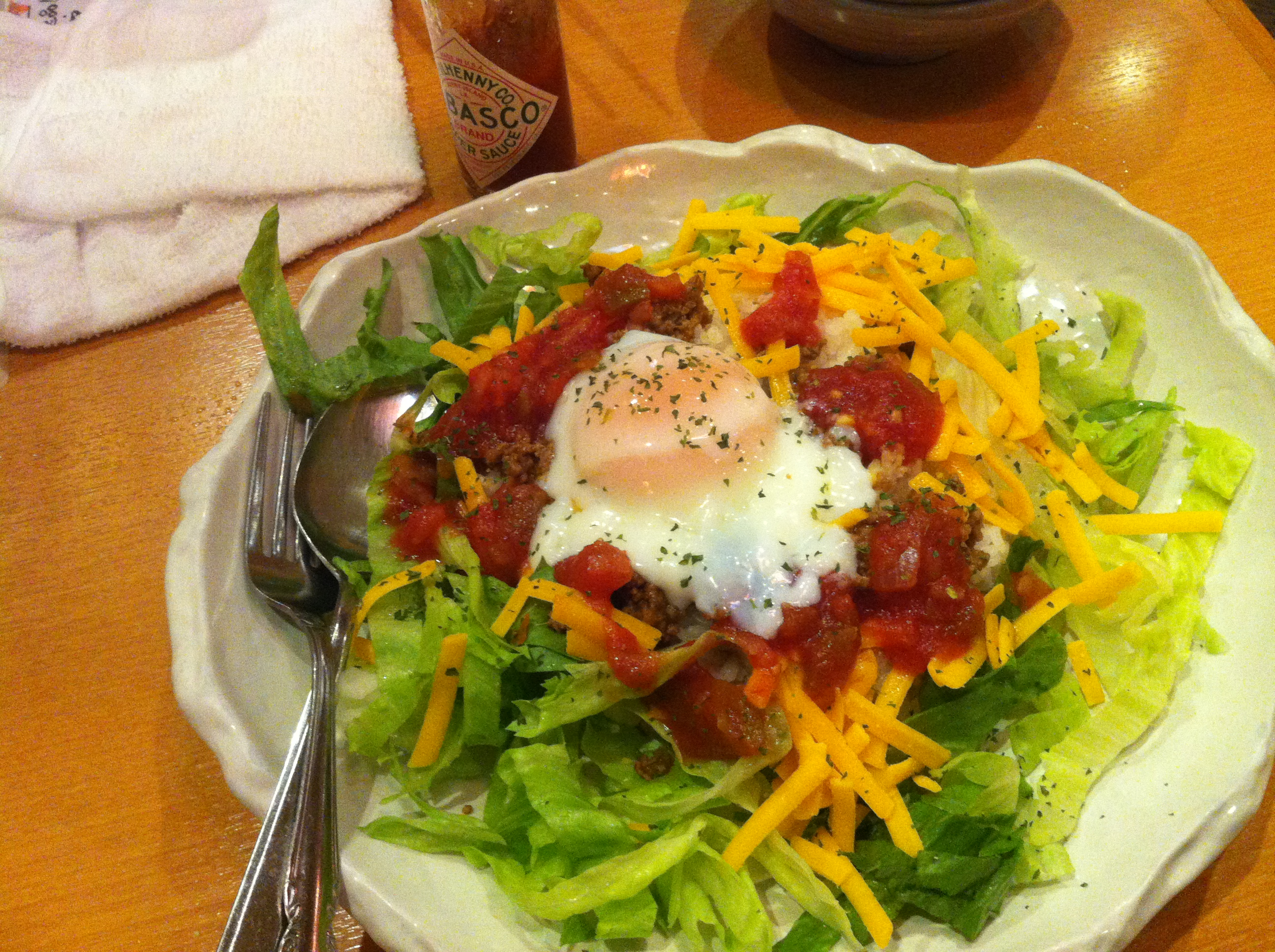

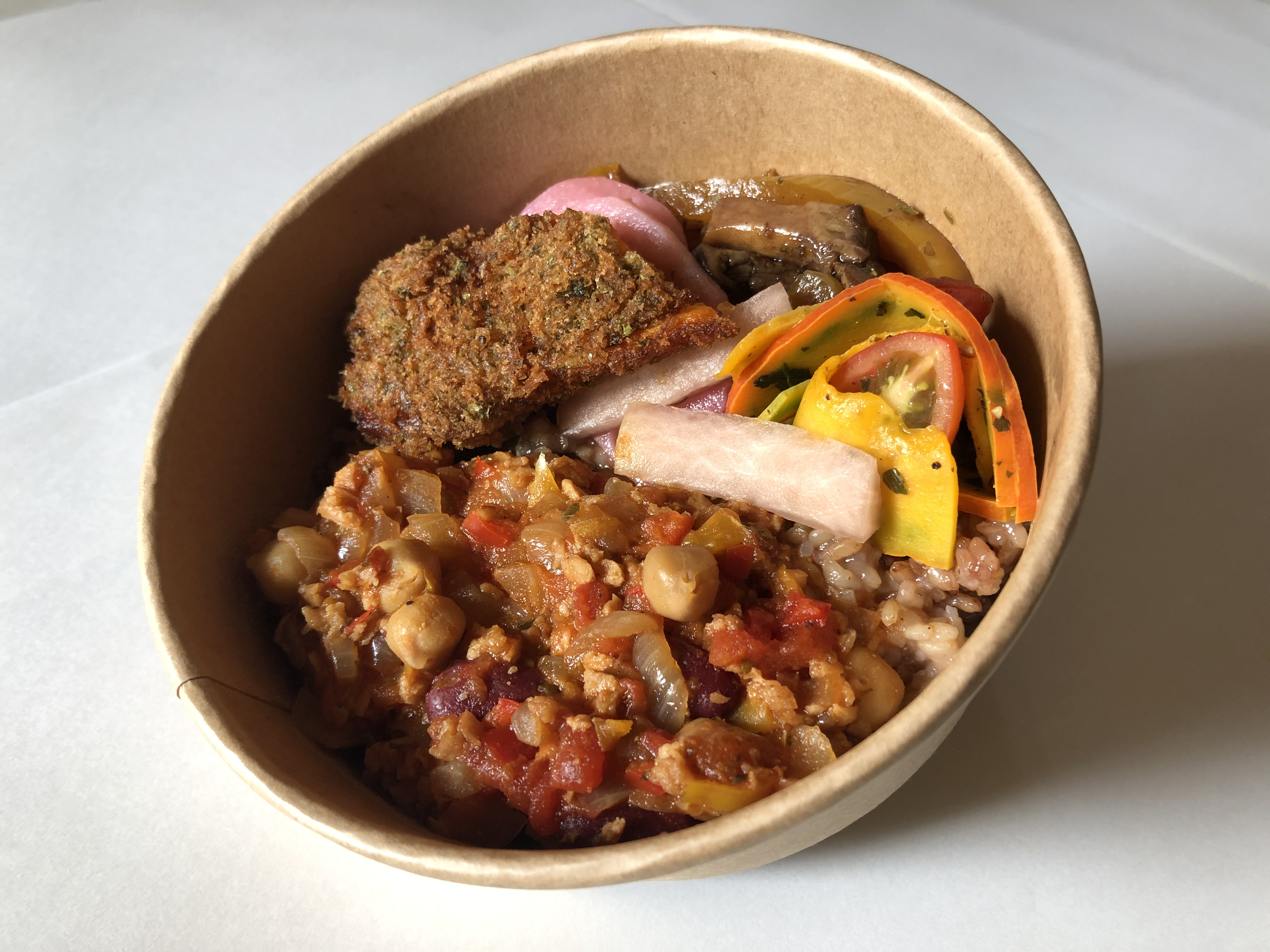

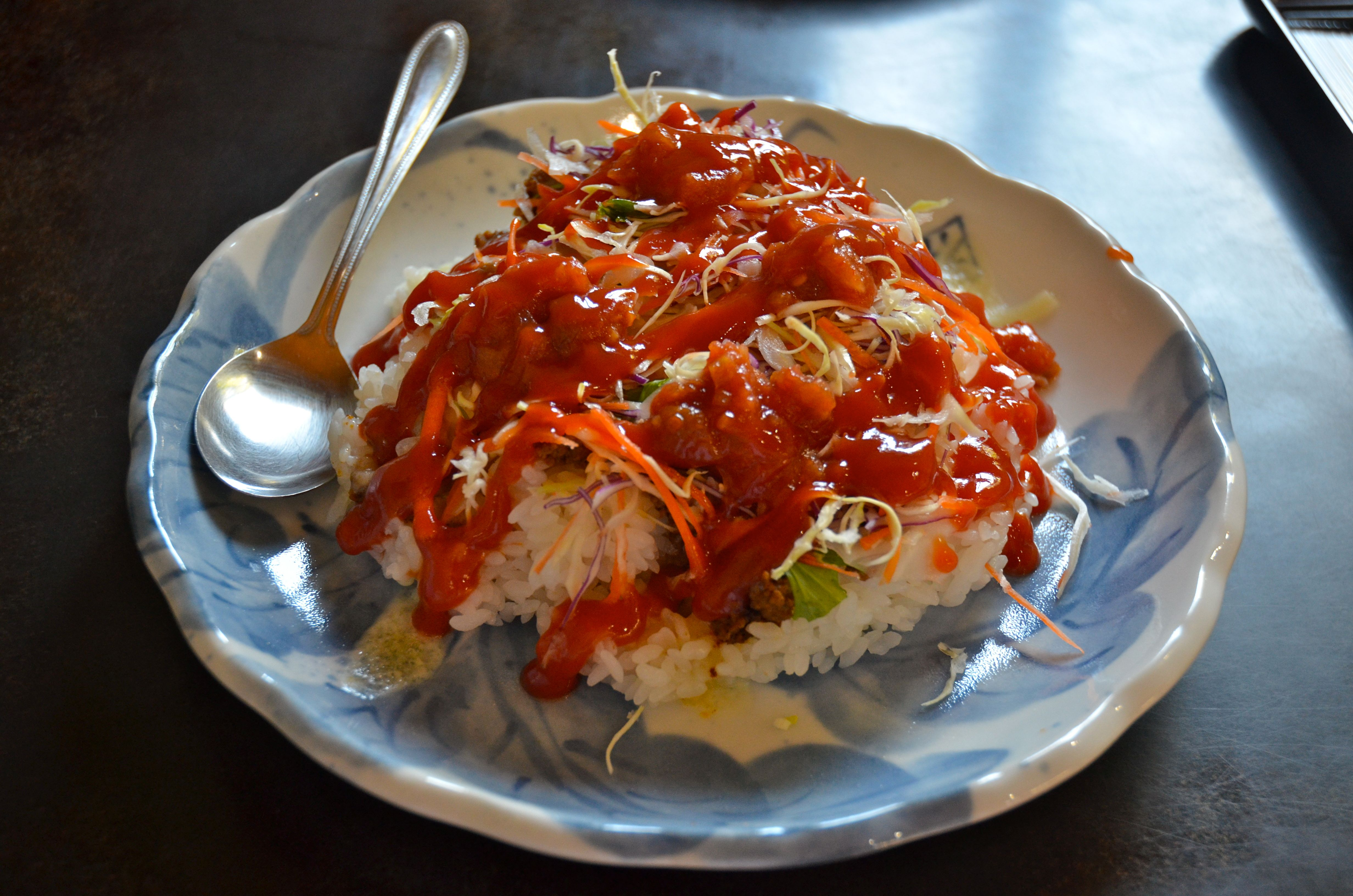
At Taketomi, Okinawa
