= Shima tofu =

Type of tofu

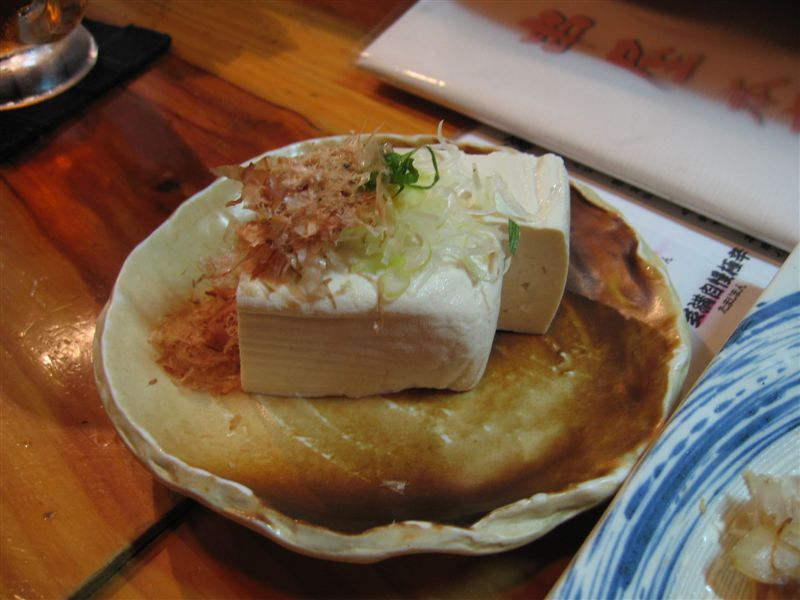
Shima Tofu served with bonito flakes and spring onions

Shima Tofu (Japanese: 島とうふ, 島豆腐, Hepburn: Shima Tōfu) is a type of tofu made and consumed in Okinawa Prefecture and Kyushu, Japan. It is also known as Okinawa Tofu (沖縄豆腐, Okinawa Tōfu).

== Overview ==
Shima Tofu is a traditional variety of tofu commonly consumed in Okinawa Prefecture and parts of Kyushu, such as Kagoshima.

Unlike the tofu typically found on Honshu, Shima Tofu contains less water than regular momen tofu and has a firm, resilient texture. It is produced using a method known as namashibori seihō (生絞り製法), in which the soy milk is extracted before being boiled and then coagulated with nigari or seawater.

Each block weighs approximately 800 grams to 1 kilogram, about three times heavier than standard tofu found on Honshu. It has a slight natural saltiness and is highly resistant to crumbling, making it ideal for stir-frying, simmered dishes, and, of course, as hiyayakko . It is a key ingredient in dishes such as Gōyā Chanpurū and various other local recipes.

Shima Tofu is also rich in nutrients, providing a good source of protein and minerals. In Okinawa, it is often sold warm and freshly made (achi-kōkō, あちこーこー), reflecting its role as a symbol of regional food culture. Its excellent shelf life makes it well-suited to the climate and lifestyle of southern Japan, including Okinawa and Kyushu.

According to a 2014 survey, 43% of respondents in Okinawa reported purchasing Shima Tofu in bags while still warm at least once a week, and 50% reported buying packed versions, exceeding the 35% purchase rate for momen or kinugoshi tofu (絹豆腐). This indicates that Shima Tofu remains an indispensable food in the lives of people in southern Japan even today.

== History ==
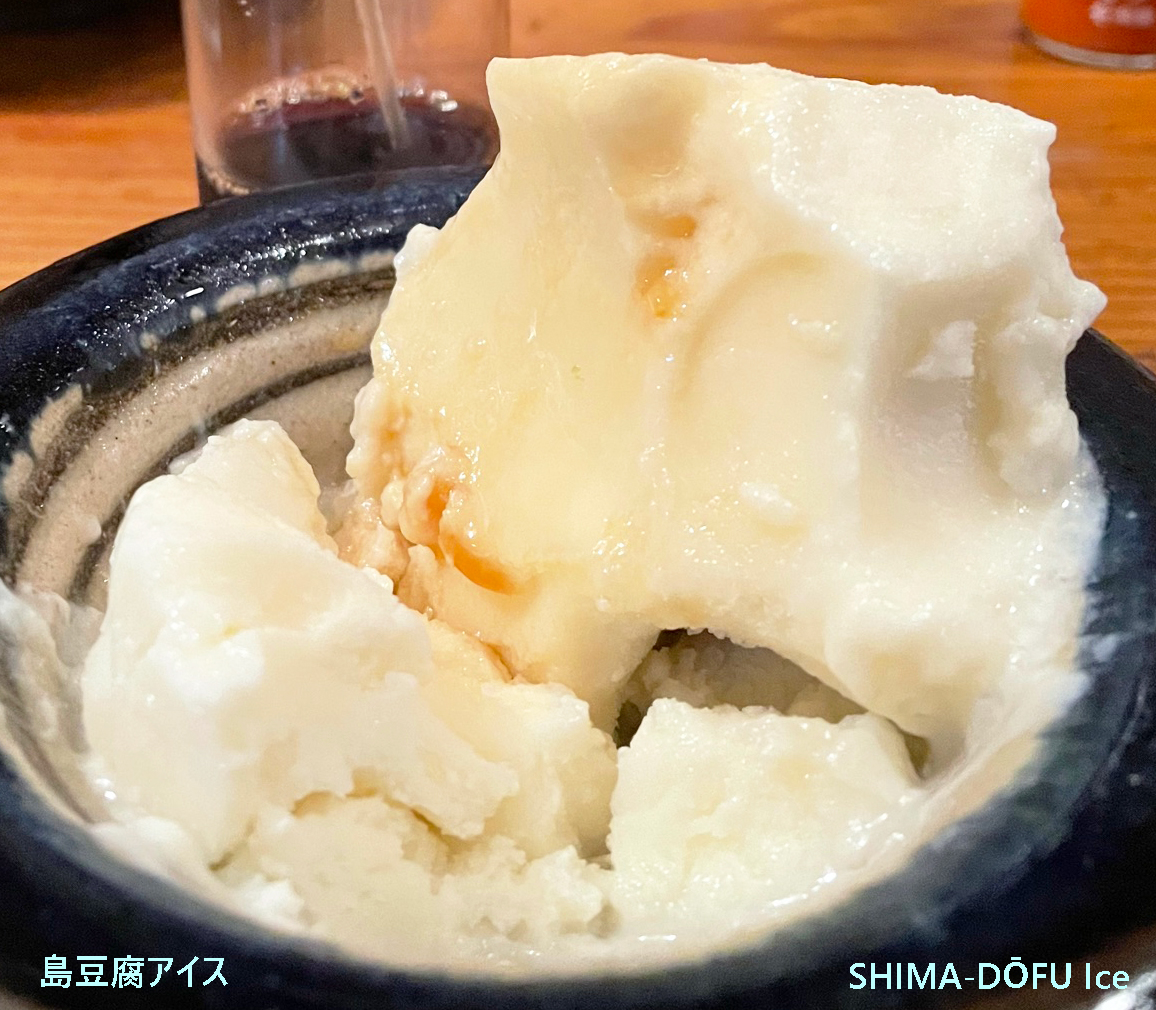
Shima tofu sorbet

The earliest recorded mention of Shima Tofu dates back to 1683, noting that a large number of shops in the city of Naha were already selling it at that time.

Because pig farming was thriving in Okinawa, the production of okara, a by-product of tofu making used as pig feed, was also common, leading to the widespread manufacture of tofu.

In the Meiji period, there was even a street in Itoman (糸満市) so densely populated with tofu vendors that it came to be known as "Tofu Town" (トーフマチ, Tōfu Machi).

Millstones used to grind soybeans were often made from andesite sourced from Iōtorishima, where the rock was abundant.

Following Okinawa's reversion to Japan in 1972, the Food Sanitation Act mandated that tofu be sold soaked in water. However, as a result of petitions emphasizing the importance of preserving local food culture, a special exemption was granted in 1974 allowing the sale of warm, freshly made tofu without immersion.

Today, Shima Tofu remains widely consumed in Okinawa and Kyushu. According to a 2012 household survey, annual household expenditure on tofu in Okinawa averaged 5,670 yen, significantly higher than the national average of 4,613 yen.

== Production method ==
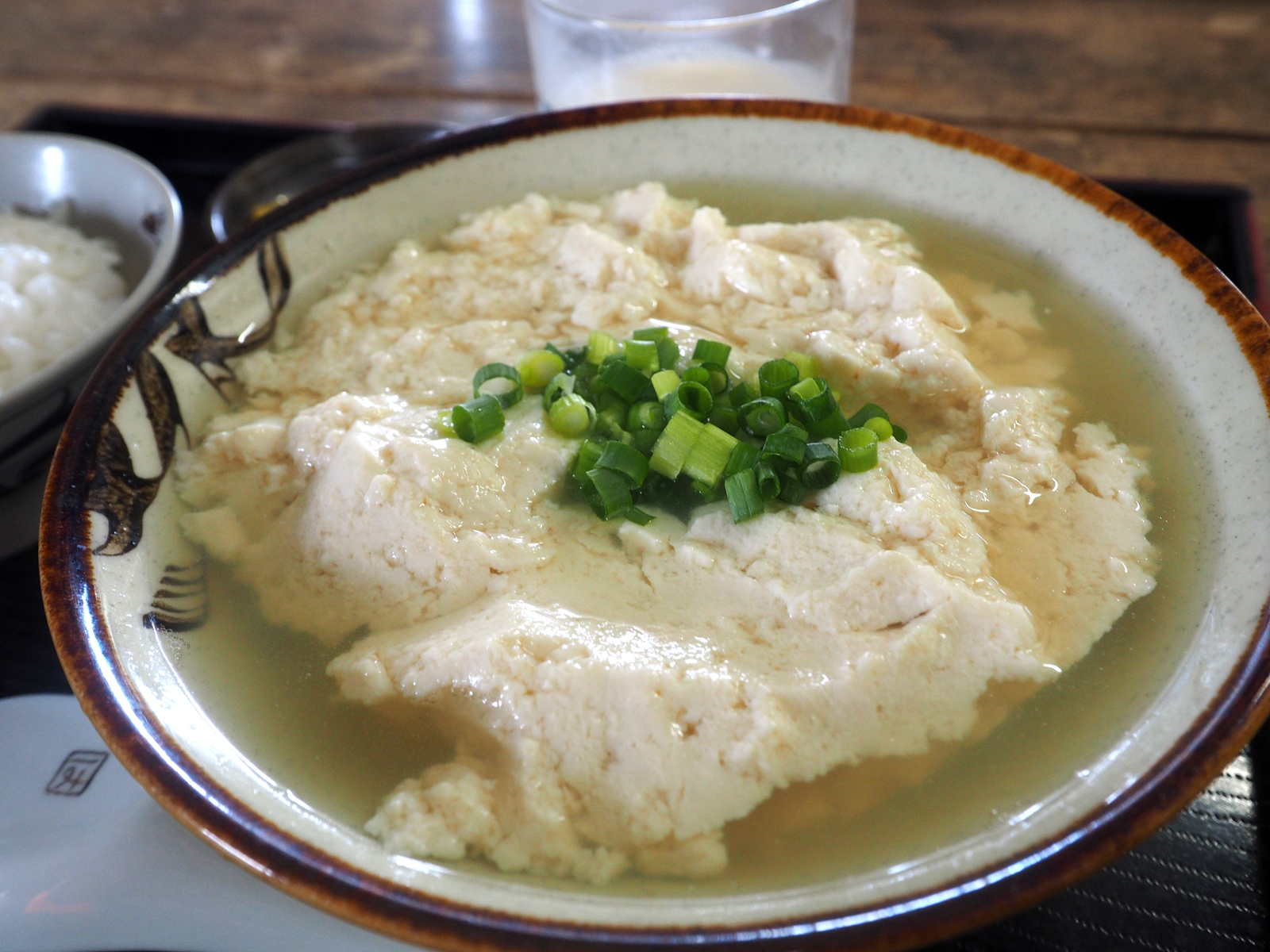
Yushi Tofu

Soybeans that have been thoroughly dried through methods such as sun-drying are first split in half using a millstone or specialized machinery. The split soybeans are then exposed to wind while being sifted, which removes the hulls. These processes allow water to quickly penetrate the soybeans. After manually removing the germ axes from the split soybeans, they are soaked in water for three to four hours. Grinding them with added water using a grinder produces raw soybean pulp.

A defining feature of traditional Shima Tofu is the namashibori method, where okara and soy milk are separated at the raw pulp stage. This approach, including the initial crushing of the soybeans, shares similarities with methods found in Southeast Asian countries such as Vietnam and Malaysia. Compared to the nishibori (煮しぼ) method, where separation occurs after boiling, the namashibori technique makes soy milk extraction more labor-intensive and results in lower yield. However, extracting at a lower temperature suppresses the release of undesirable flavors caused by isoflavonoids and saponins, providing a distinct advantage.

The soy milk obtained through namashibori is transferred to a large traditional iron pot (地釜, jikama) and simmered for about an hour to develop its aroma. During this process, any foam that forms is removed. Then, a coagulant such as seawater or nigari (にがり) is added. The resulting soft, fluffy tofu at this stage is called yushi-tōfu (ゆし豆腐), which can also be eaten directly with soy sauce.

The yushi-dōfu is poured into a mold lined with cloth, and the water is drained, resulting in finished Shima Tofu.

While traditionally sold warm, in recent years packaged and refrigerated versions have become available, offering longer shelf life and easier inventory management for retailers.
