= Okinawan cuisine =

Cuisine of Okinawa Prefecture, Japan

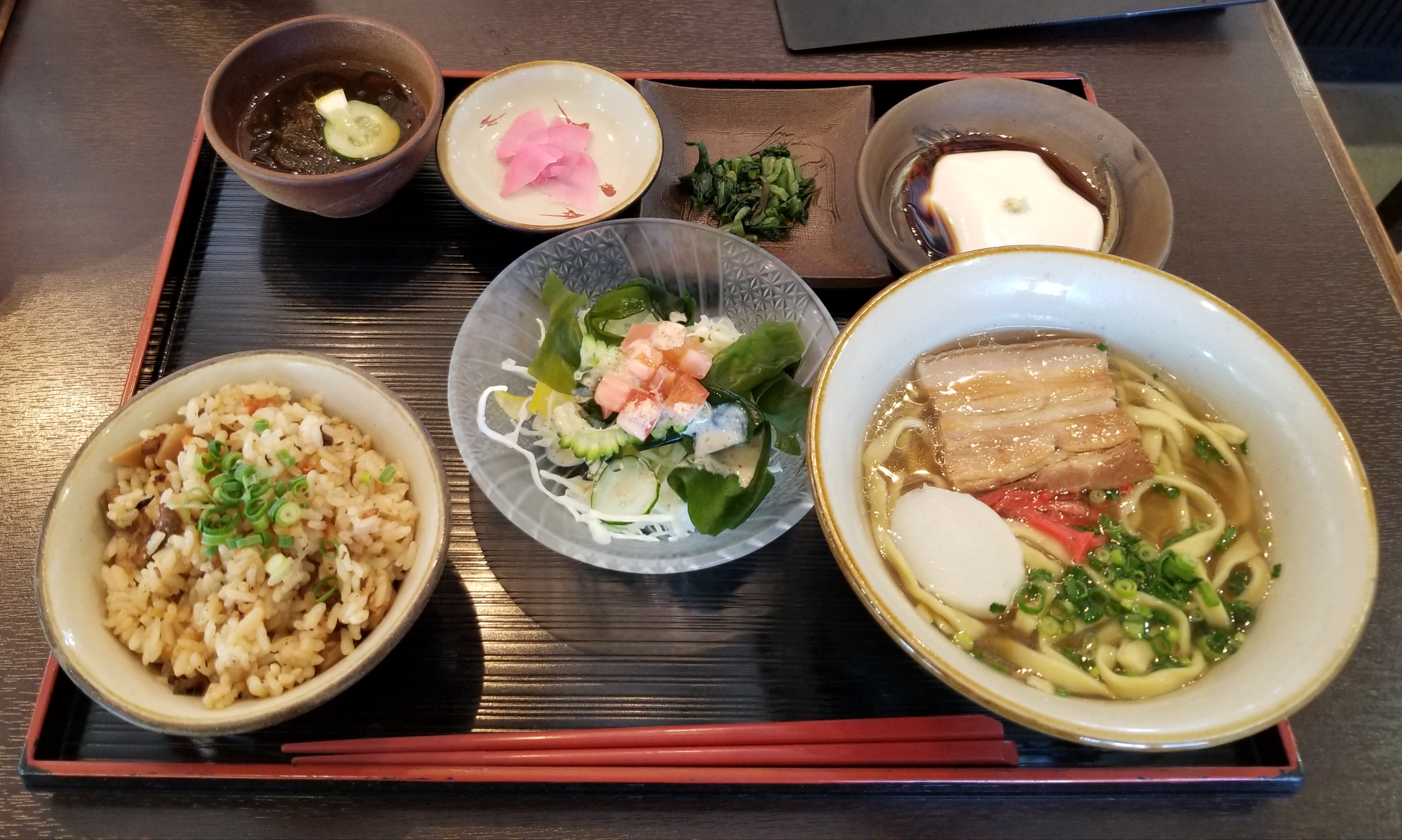
A contemporary Okinawan cuisine set. From left to right: Top row: mozuku, sakurazuke, Okinawa spinach, jimami tofu; Bottom row: Okinawa seasoned rice, goya salad, Okinawa soba

Okinawan cuisine (Japanese: 沖縄料理, Hepburn: Okinawa ryōri) is the food culture of Ryukyu Islands, Japan. The cuisine is also known as Ryukyuan cuisine (琉球料理, Ryūkyū ryōri), a reference to the Ryukyu Kingdom. Due to differences in culture, historical contact between other regions, climate, vegetables and other ingredients, Okinawan cuisine differs from Japanese cuisine.

== History ==
Okinawan cuisine incorporates influences from Chinese cuisine and Southeast Asian cuisine due to its long history of trade. The sweet potato, introduced in Okinawa in 1605, became a staple food in Okinawa from then until the beginning of the 20th century. Goya (bitter melon) and nabera (luffa or towel gourd) were likely introduced to Okinawa from Southeast Asia. Since Ryukyu had served as a tributary state to China, Ryukyuan cooks traveled to Fujian Province to learn how to cook Chinese food; Chinese influence seeped into Okinawa in that manner. Pork, which plays an important role in the Okinawan diet, diffused in the seventeenth century in response to demands from Chinese ambassadors, who preferred it to beef. The trade with Siam (Thailand) also introduced the use of Thai indica rice, which is used for the distillation of awamori from the 15th century. After the lord of the Satsuma Domain invaded the Ryukyus, Ryukyuan cooks traveled to Japan to study Japanese cuisine, causing that influence to seep into Okinawan cuisine.

Okinawa was administered by the United States after World War II, during which time various canned foods were popularized. American hamburger shops entered into the Okinawa market earlier than on the mainland. It was during this period that Ryukyuan became familiar with Americanized food culture. Wheat flour and dishes inspired by Western cuisine became popular on the islands as well as mainland Japan, resulting in dishes such as taco rice and fried Spam.

== Character ==
Besides vegetables and fruits, the influences of southern and southeastern Asia are evident in Okinawan cuisine in its use of herbs and spices, such as turmeric, used in Okinawa more often than in Japan, but less frequently than other tropical island cuisines. Okinawan cuisine's condiments consist mainly of salt, miso, bonito flakes (katsuobushi) or kombu. Compared to Japanese diets, Okinawan dishes do not use as many kinds of mushroom.

Despite being surrounded by the sea, Ryukyuan eat relatively little seafood compared to other maritime cultures. Fish and other seafood products were traditionally difficult to preserve in the high temperatures of the Okinawan islands. Additionally, the islands are surrounded by relatively few fish species. The primary preparations of fish are pickling in salt (shio-zuke), dried, grilled, simmered in soy sauce (nitsuke), and as kamaboko, a processed seafood product typically made from white fish. Sashimi is served in Okinawa, but is limited by the inability to retain freshness due to high temperatures on the islands. Sashimi, unlike on Japan, is not part of a full course meal.

Ryukyuan make salad, soup, or tempura using seaweeds like mozuku and hijiki. Okinawan cuisine frequently uses kombu (kelp), not only in making soup stock, but also in preparing braised dishes, stir-fried dishes and so on. Although it is not cultivated in the region, Okinawa is one of the largest consumers of kombu in Japan. Okinawan staple foods include roots, such as sweet potato or taro, carotenoid and other antioxidant-rich vegetables.

== Ingredients ==
- Meat and meat products
  - Pork
  - Sōki – stewed pork ribs.
  - Beef
  - Goat
- Fish
  - Abasaa (porcupinefish)
  - Gurukun (double-lined fusilier)
  - Sururugwaa (silver-stripe round herring)
- Fruit
  - Pineapples
  - Papayas
  - Mangoes
  - Passion fruit
  - Guavas
  - Citrus fruit
- Vegetables
  - Sweet potato (until the 1950s, they provided more than half of the daily calorie intake, then mostly replaced by grains)
  - Cabbage
  - Gōyā/bitter melon
  - Nāberā/Luffa
  - Shīkwāsā
  - Yams
  - Taro root
  - Seaweed
  - Garlic
  - Onions
  - Tomato
  - Salad leaves
- Bean products
  - Oomaamii/Aomame
  - Shima tofu
- Grains and grain products
  - White rice
  - Brown rice
  - Fu/Seitan

== Common dishes of modern Okinawan cuisine ==
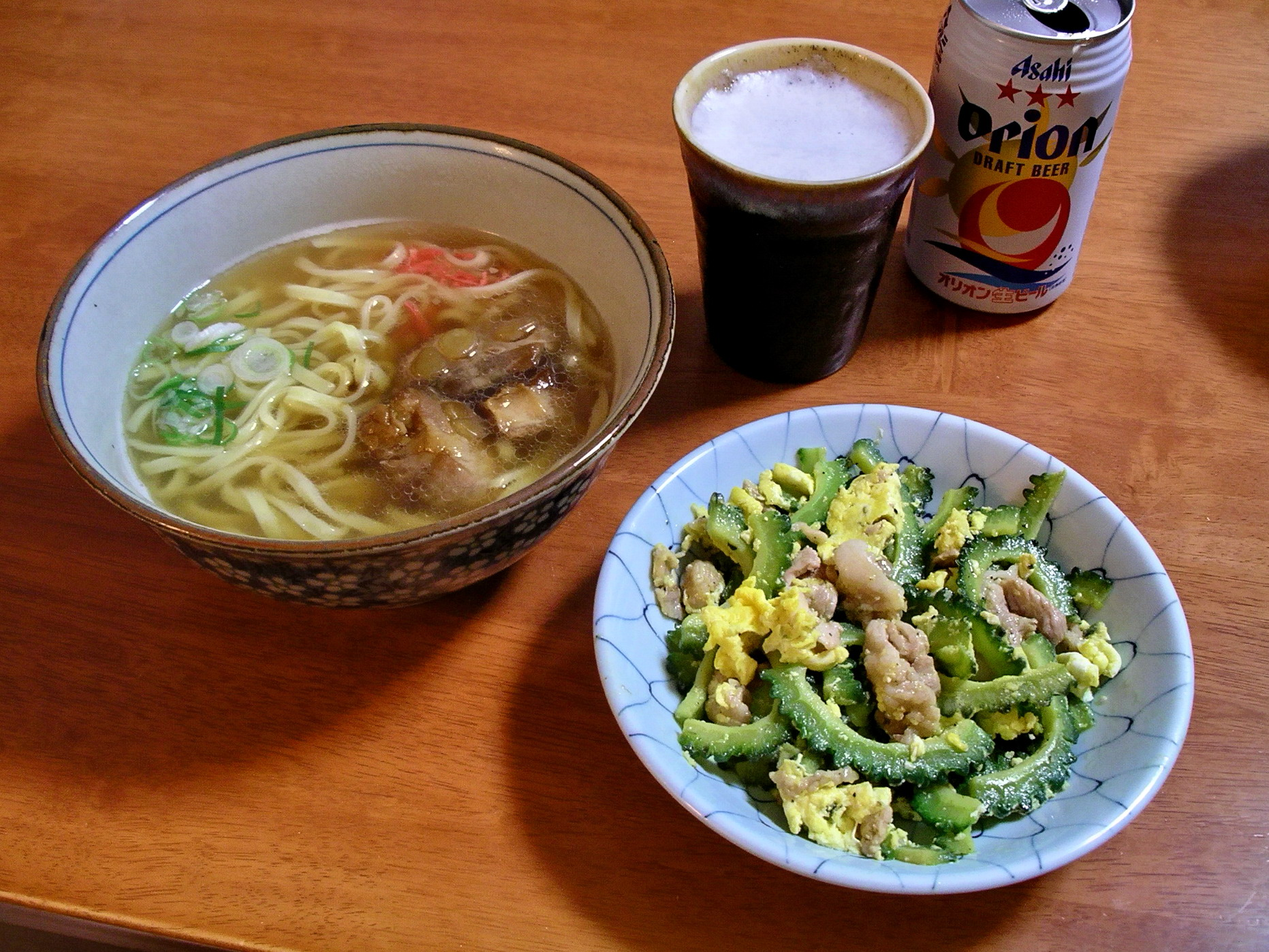
Okinawa soba and goya chanpuru with a cup of Orion beer

=== Main dishes ===
- Chanpurū – Okinawan stir-fry
- Jūshī
- Suba (Okinawa soba) – a noodle soup vaguely resembling udon, often topped with soki ("soki-soba")
- Rafute (Shoyu pork) – stewed pork belly
- Taco rice
- Minudaru (steamed pork)
- Keihan – chicken rice
- Abura-zōmen

=== Side dishes ===
- Mimigā (ミミガー) (pig's ear)
- Umi-budō
- Hirayachi
- Tofuyo dish
- Naaberaa Nbushii – miso-flavored luffa stir-fry

=== Alcoholic beverages ===
- Awamori
- Orion beer

=== Sweets ===
- Beniimo (紅芋)
- Chinsukō
- Fuchagi – mochi with sweet beans
- Jīmami dōfu – peanut-tofu squares
- Sata andagi
- Muchi
- Okinawan brown sugar
