= Chanpurū =

Okinawan stir fry dish

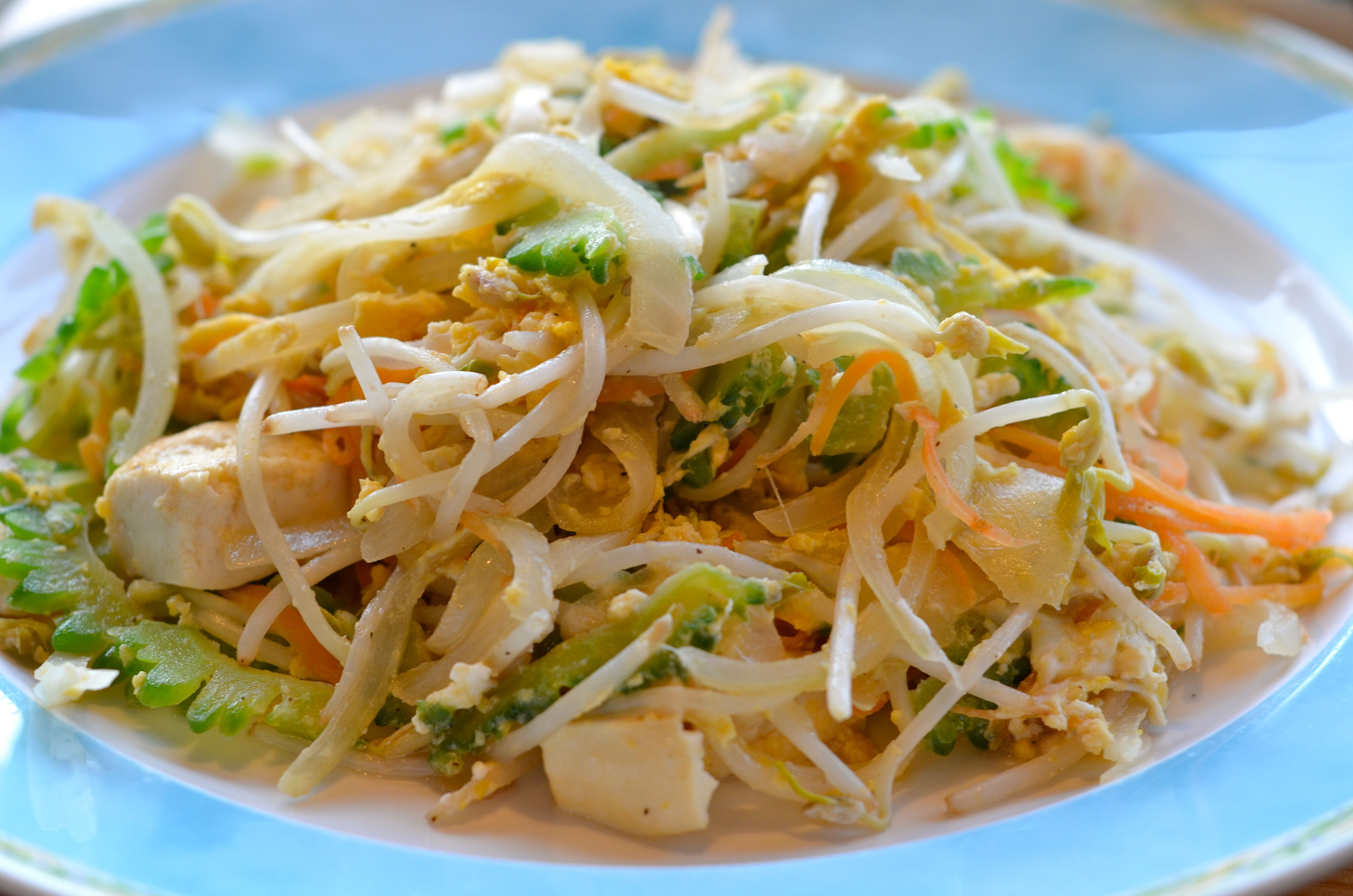
- Gōyā chanpurū
- Alternative names: チャンプルー
- Type: Stir fry
- Place of origin: Japan
- Region or state: Okinawa Prefecture
- Main ingredients: Tofu, vegetables

Chanpurū (Okinawan: チャンプルー) is an Okinawan stir fry dish. It is considered the representative dish of Okinawan cuisine. It generally consists of tofu combined with some kind of vegetable, meat, or fish. Luncheon meat (such as American Spam or Danish Tulip), egg, moyashi (bean sprouts) and gōyā (bitter melon) are some other common ingredients. Spam is not typically used in mainland Japan, but it is more common in Okinawa due primarily to the historical influence of its introduction by the US Navy. Chanpurū is Okinawan for "something mixed" and the word is sometimes used to refer to the culture of Okinawa, as it can be seen as a mixture of traditional Okinawan, Chinese, mainland Japanese, Southeast Asian and North American culture. The term originates from the Malay word campur, meaning "mix".

Long a local specialty only found on Okinawa, chanpurū has in recent years, through television shows and increased interest in Okinawan culture, spread to many restaurants on mainland Japan.

== Types of chanpurū ==
Gōyā chanpurū (Okinawan: ゴーヤーチャンプルー) is the quintessential chanpurū. It consists of bitter melon (gōyā), egg, Shima tofu, and either Spam or thinly sliced pork belly or canned tuna. It often also stir fried with vegetables such as carrots. Other variations include tofu chanpurū (Okinawan: トーフチャンプルー) made with firm Shima tofu, māmina (mung bean sprout) chanpurū (Okinawan: マーミナーチャンプルー), fū (seitan) chanpurū (Okinawan: フーチャンプルー), sōmin (sōmen) chanpurū (Okinawan: ソーミンチャンプルー), and nābērā (luffa) chanpurū (Okinawan: ゴーヤーチャンプルー).

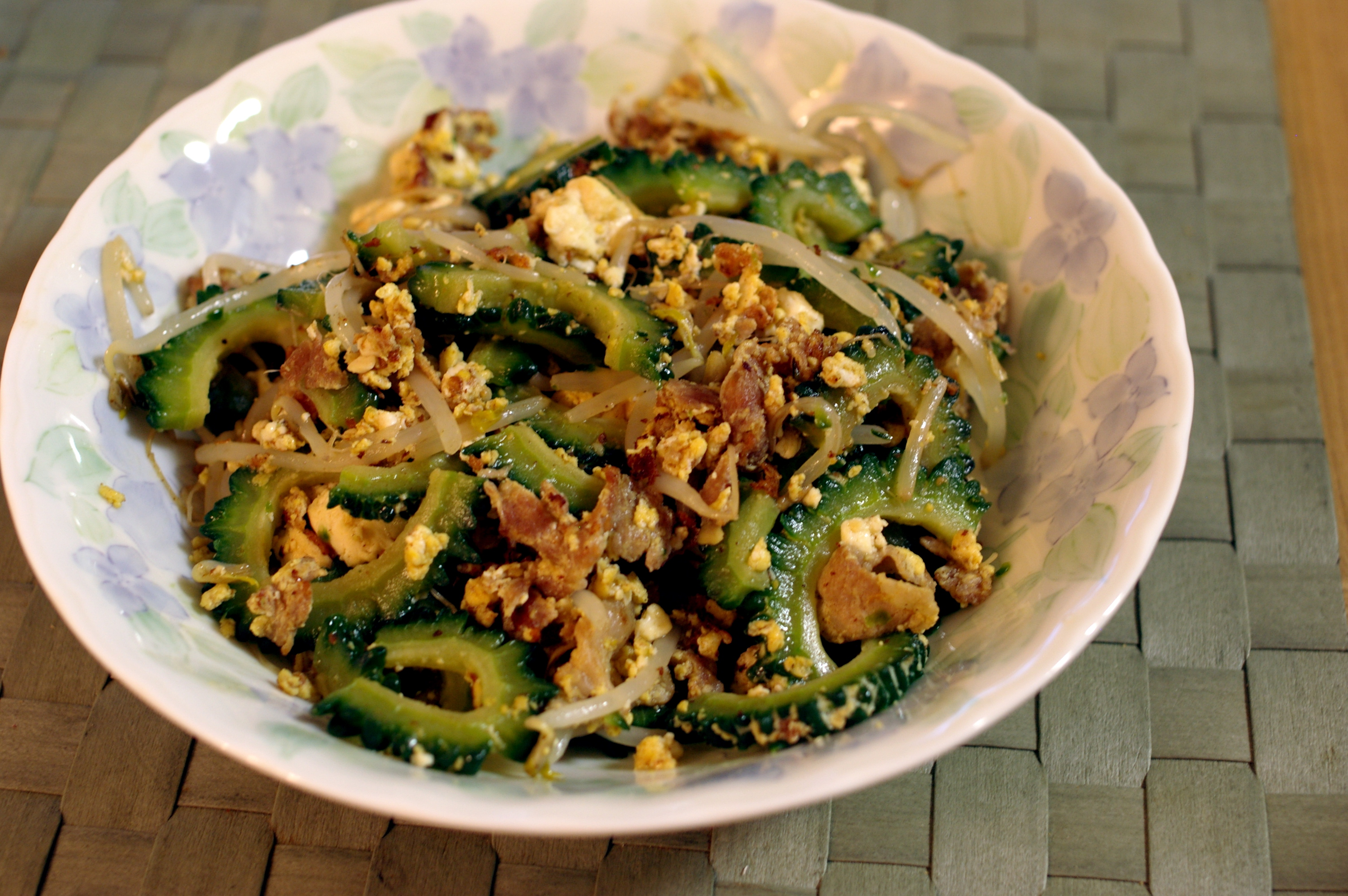
With gōyā

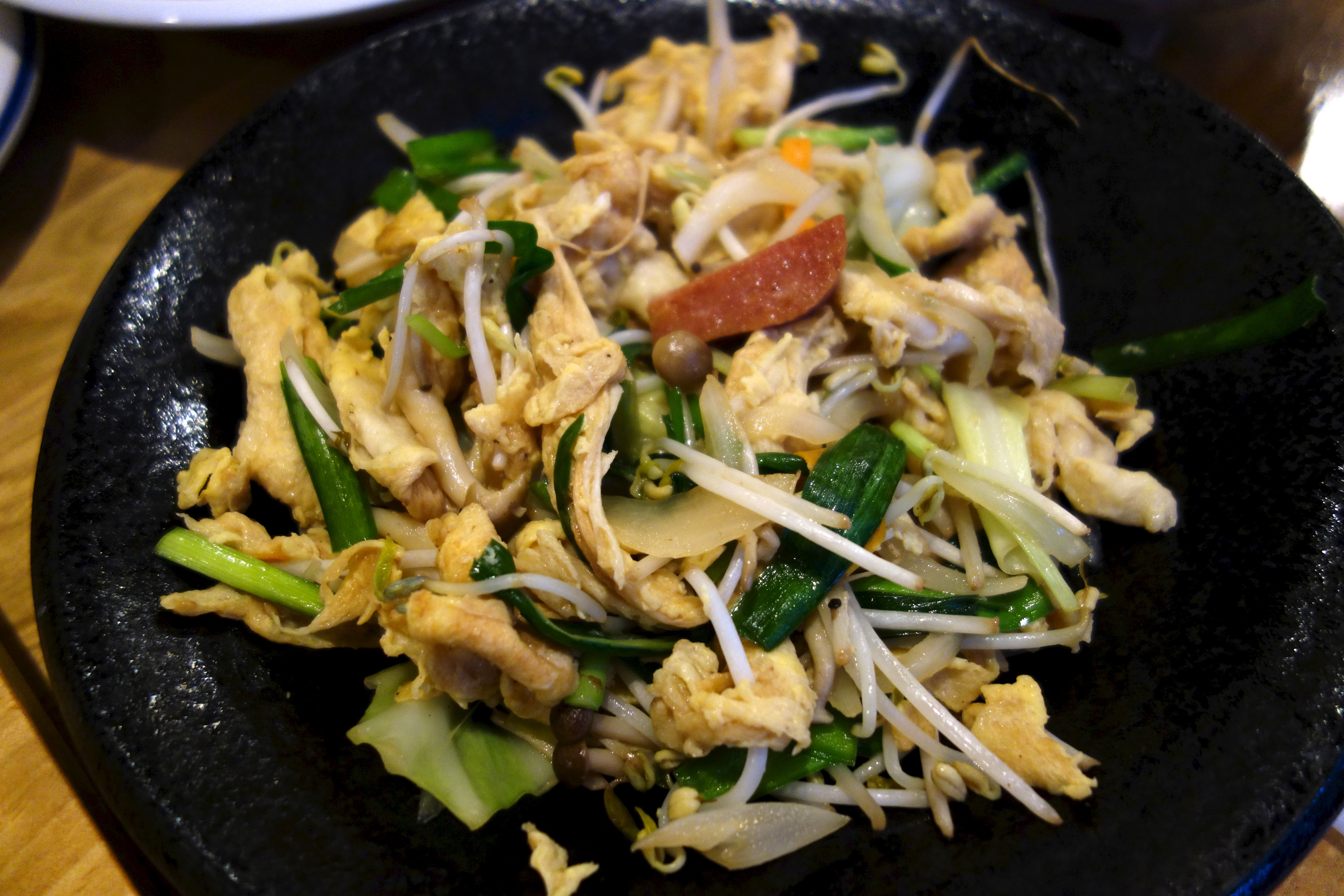
With fu

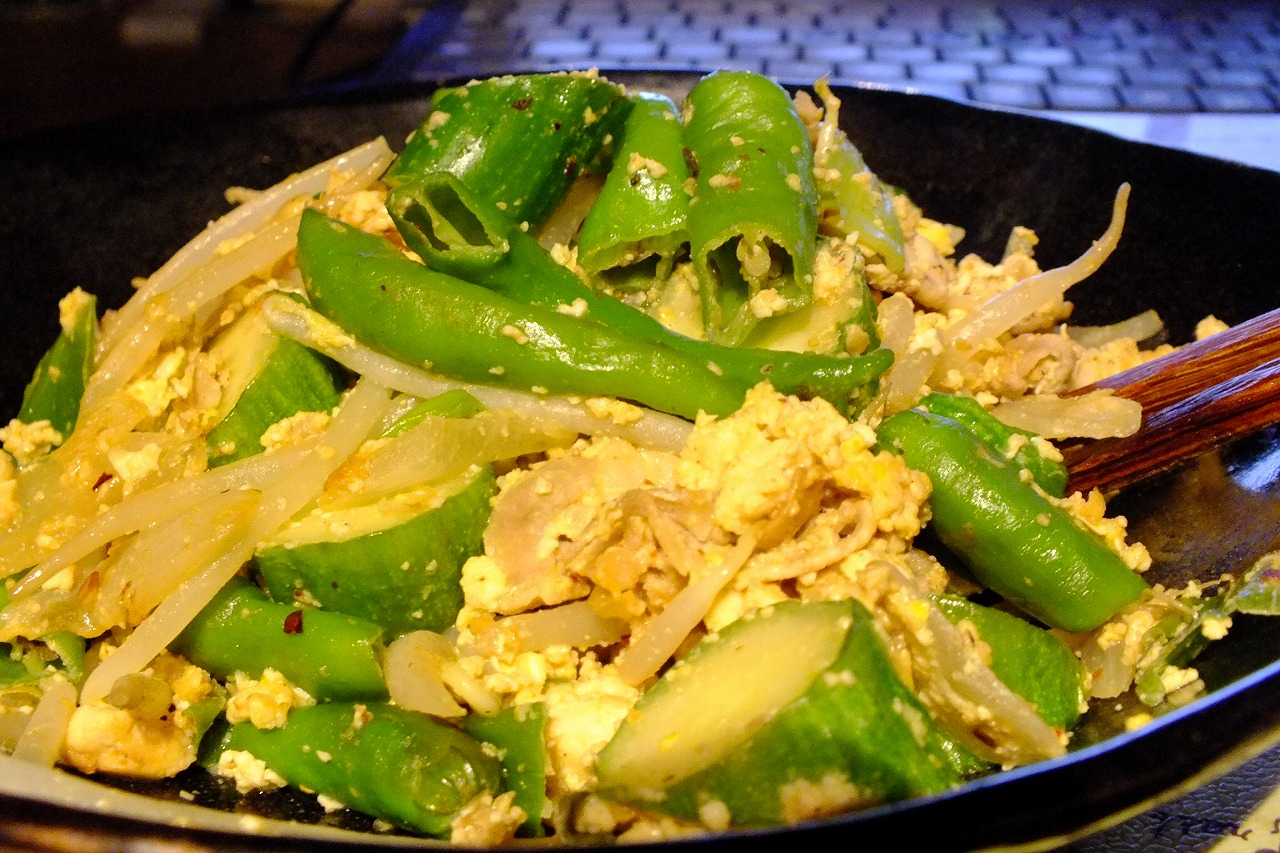
With egg

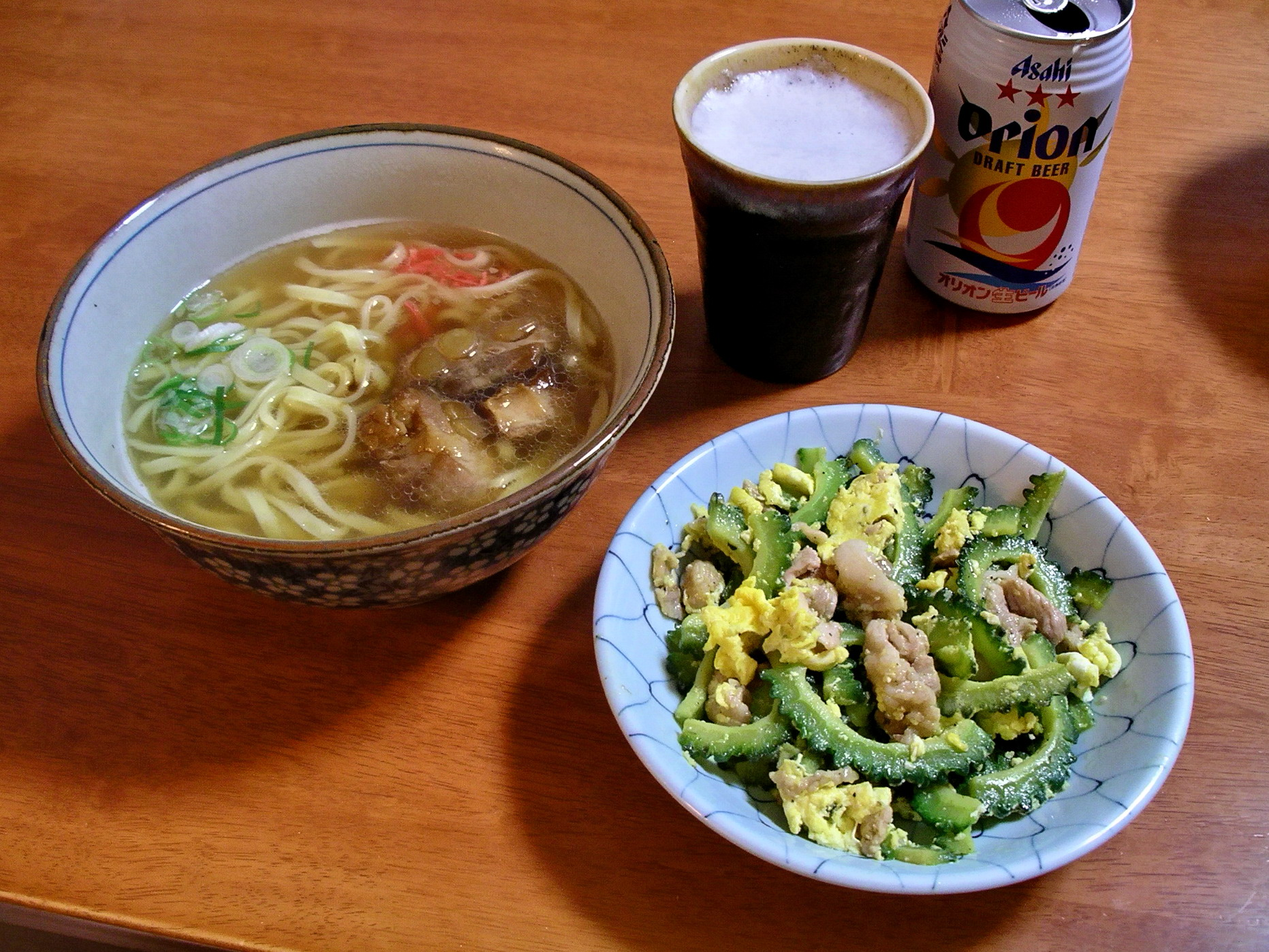
With Okinawa soba and Orion beer

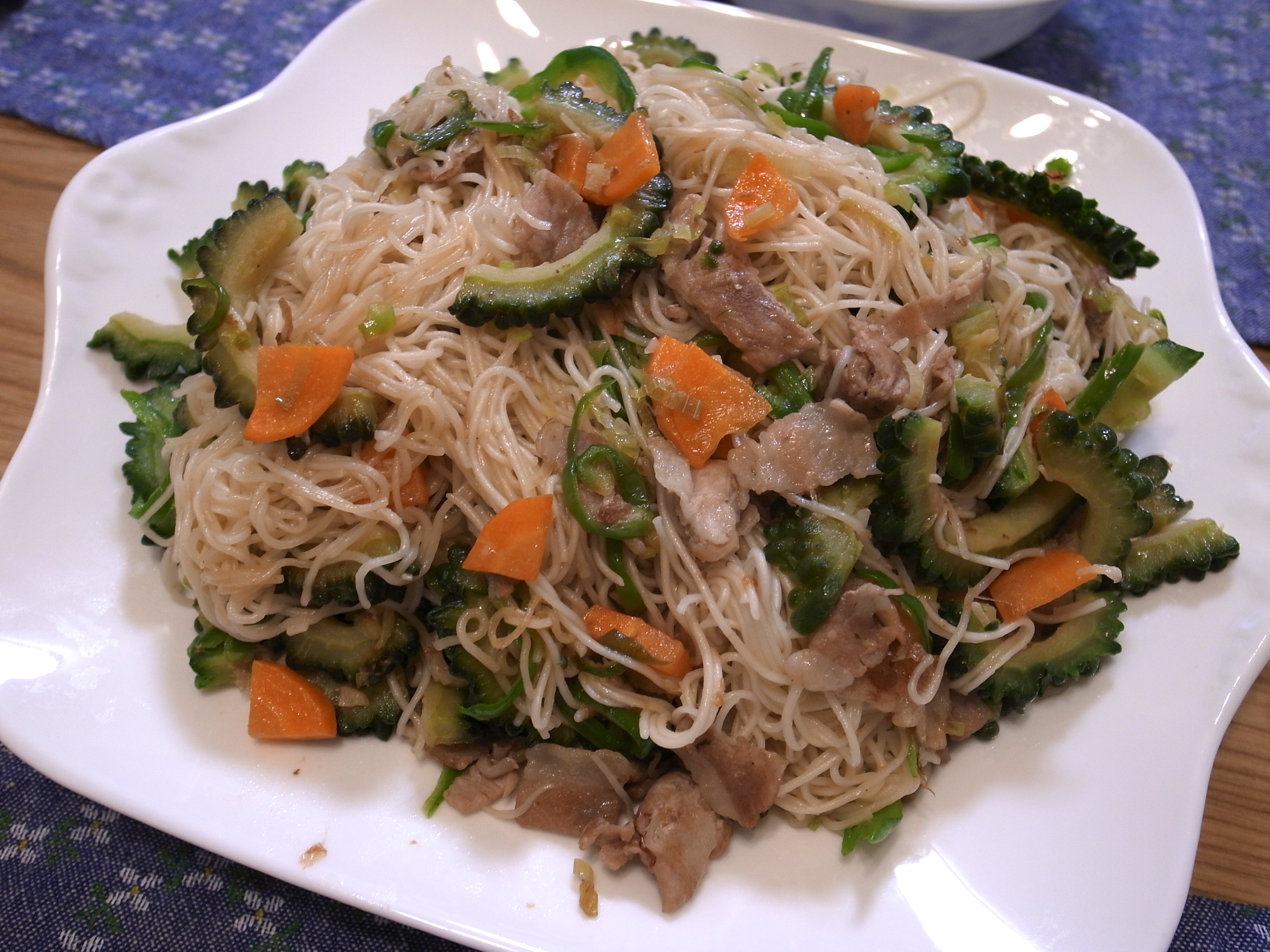
With somen

== See also ==
- Champloose
- List of tofu dishes
