= Keihan (dish) =

Amami dish

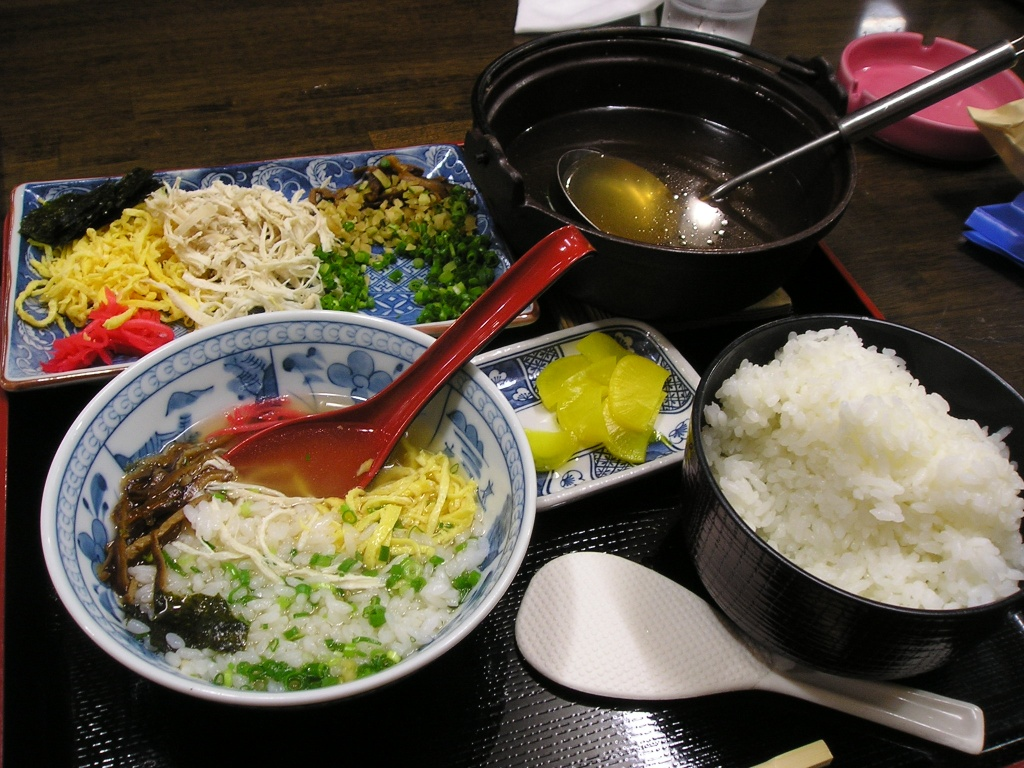
Keihan rice

Keihan (鶏飯, "chicken-rice") is a local dish of the Amami Islands, Kagoshima Prefecture in the south of Japan. It is generally cooked with chicken, and although the exact recipe can vary, it often includes ingredients such as egg, pickles, dried shiitake, orange peel, nori, soup stock and sake. It is a popular meal in Kagoshima Prefecture, and a standard school lunch menu.

The origin of Keihan rice is unclear. One theory is that it evolved from a local variant of takikomi gohan, in the town of Kasari in Amami Ōshima, but it is also possible that the dish was brought into Amami from the Japanese mainland. It is thought to date back at least as far as the Edo period (1600–1867); the lords of Kagoshima, the Shimazu clan, would often serve Keihan rice when entertaining government officials, and the recipe features in many contemporary cooking books.

== See also ==
- Chazuke
