= Okitsura =

Japanese manga series by Egumi Sora

- Okitsura: Fell in Love with an Okinawan Girl, but I Just Wish I Knew What She's Saying
- First tankōbon volume cover

沖縄で好きになった子が方言すぎてツラすぎる (Okinawa de Suki ni Natta Ko ga Hōgen Sugite Tsurasugiru)
- Genre: Romantic comedy
- Manga
- Written by: Egumi Sora
- Published by: Shinchosha
- Imprint: Bunch Comics
- Magazine: Kurage Bunch
- Original run: January 10, 2020 – present
- Volumes: 12
- Anime television series
- Directed by: Shin Itagaki (chief); Shingo Tanabe
- Written by: Shin Itagaki; Shingo Tanabe
- Music by: Tomohisa Ishikawa; Yoshimi Katayama; Ayano Kinjō
- Studio: Millepensee
- Licensed by: Crunchyroll
- Original network: Tokyo MX, BS11, AT-X, GYT, OTV, RBC, QAB
- Original run: January 5, 2025 – March 23, 2025
- Episodes: 12
- icon

Okitsura: Fell in Love with an Okinawan Girl, but I Just Wish I Knew What She's Saying (Note: Japanese: 沖縄で好きになった子が方言すぎてツラすぎる, Hepburn: Okinawa de Suki ni Natta Ko ga Hōgen Sugite Tsurasugiru; lit. ''The Dialect of the Girl I Fell in Love with in Okinawa Is Too Difficult to Deal With'') is a Japanese manga series written and illustrated by Egumi Sora. It began serialization on Shinchosha's Kurage Bunch website in January 2020. An anime television series adaptation produced by Millepensee aired from January to March 2025.

== Plot ==
Nakamura Teruaki, a boy from Tokyo who transfers to Uruma, Okinawa Prefecture as a student, meets, and develops a crush on, his new classmate, Kyan Hina. Talking to her, however, is a problem because she mostly speaks in the Okinawan dialect. He would not understand her at all if not for another classmate of his, Hina's friend Higa Kana, who translates for him. Unbeknownst to Teruaki, Kana has a crush on him, and has been translating for him as an excuse to get near him. With them and their friends, Teruaki becomes more exposed and learns a lot about Okinawa, its people, and its culture.

== Characters ==
Teruaki Nakamura (中村 照秋, Nakamura Teruaki)
Voiced by: Takeo Ōtsuka
A transfer student who moves in to Okinawa from Tokyo. He has a crush on Hina, but does not understand her Okinawan dialect. Over the course of his time, he begins to enjoy the culture and traditions of Okinawa.
Hina Kyan (喜屋武 飛夏, Kyan Hina)
Voiced by: Akari Kitō (PV, anime)
A girl who speaks with an Okinawan dialect. She is also proficient with the Okinawan language. She is outgoing and is kind to children and helps when she can. She is completely oblivious to Teruaki's crush on her, and isn't keen on the idea of having a relationship with anyone, something that usually mortifies her.
Kana Higa (比嘉 夏菜, Higa Kana)
Voiced by: Fairouz Ai (PV, anime)
A friend of Hina and classmate of Teruaki. She helps translate Hina's Okinawan dialect to Teruaki. She appears to be in love with Teruaki, and often feels jealous when he only shows affection to Hina and not her; Teruaki is completely oblivious to this.
Yae Agena (安慶名八重, Agena Yae)
Voiced by: Shino Shimoji
A friend of Hina and Kana, and she could tell Kana has a crush on Teruaki, just as Teruaki has a crush on Hina.
Tensuke Uema (上間 天介, Uema Tensuke)
Voiced by: Shugo Nakamura
Isao Shimoji (下地 勲, Shimoji Isao)
Voiced by: Kentarō Kumagai
Isao and Tensuke are classmates of Teruaki, Hina, and Kana who would occasionally hang around.
Oki Memo Shisha (沖メモシーサー)
Voiced by: Etsuko Kozakura
A shisa who would come out and point out the intricacies of Okinawan culture.
Tetsu Higa (比嘉 鉄, Higa Tetsu)
Voiced by: Yamato Kinjo
Kana's older brother. He can be distinguished by his glasses, hairstyle, and tanned skin. He knows how to fish using a purse seine net.
Suzu Higa (比嘉 すず, Higa Suzu)
Voiced by: Miyuri Shimabukuro
Kana's younger sister. She and her brother first met Teruaki by the seaside, which led to him meeting Kana.
Naoya Higa (比嘉 なおや, Higa Naoya)
Voiced by: Risa Tsumugi
Kana's younger brother. He and Suzu first met Teruaki by the seaside, which led to him meeting Kana.
Sachiko Kyan (喜屋武 幸子, Kyan Sachiko)
Voiced by: Yūko Gibu
Hina's grandmother.

== Media ==
=== Manga ===
Written and illustrated by Egumi Sora, Okinawa de Suki ni Natta Ko ga Hōgen Sugite Tsurasugiru began serialization in Shinchosha's Kurage Bunch manga website on January 10, 2020. The first volume was released on July 9, 2020. It has been collected in twelve tankōbon volumes as of November 9, 2026.

No.	Release date	ISBN
1	July 9, 2020	978-4-10-772296-6
2	February 9, 2021	978-4-10-772359-8
3	August 6, 2021	978-4-10-772410-6
4	January 8, 2022	978-4-10-772460-1
5	June 9, 2022	978-4-10-772506-6
6	January 7, 2023	978-4-10-772559-2
7	July 7, 2023	978-4-10-772617-9
8	February 8, 2024	978-4-10-772682-7
9	January 8, 2025	978-4-10-772784-8
10	May 9, 2025	978-4-10-772829-6
11	February 9, 2026	978-4-10-772910-1
12	November 9, 2026	978-4-10-773000-8

=== Anime ===
An anime television series adaptation was announced on July 3, 2023. It is produced by Millepensee and written and directed by Shingo Tanabe and Shin Itagaki, with Itagaki serving as chief director, Tomohiro Yoshida designing the characters, Tomohisa Ishikawa, Yoshimi Katayama, and Ayano Kinjō composing the music, Hodaka Fukumura serving as dialect coach, and narration by Tarusuke Shingaki. The series aired from January 5 to March 23, 2025, on Tokyo MX and other networks. (Note: Tokyo MX and BS11 lists the series premiere on January 4, 2025, at 25:00, which is effectively January 5 at 1:00 a.m. JST.) Crunchyroll streamed the series. Okinawan VTuber Ui Nema served as a public relations ambassador for the anime adaptation.

The opening theme song is "Dai Dai Daisuki" (大大大好き, I Really, Really Love You), performed by Okinawan band HY, while each episode features a different ending theme song which are covers related to Okinawa, all performed by Akari Kitō and Fairouz Ai as their respective characters Hina and Kana.

==== Episodes ====
No.	Title	Directed by	Written by	Storyboarded by	Ending theme song (Note: Ending theme is taken from the ending credits of each episode.)	Original release date
1	"The Girl I Like Speaks in Uchinaaguchi"; Transliteration: "Suki na Hito wa Uchinā-guchi" (Japanese: 好きな人はうちなーぐち)	Shingo Tanabe	Shingo Tanabe	Shingo Tanabe; Shin Itagaki	"Shimanchu nu Takara"	January 5, 2025
Nakamura Teruaki is a boy from Tokyo who gets transferred to Okinawa as a student. Here he meets, and develops a crush on, his new classmate, Kyan Hina, who does not reciprocate his feelings whatsoever. Trouble is, he has problems talking to her because she speaks in high-level Okinawan (Uchinaaguchi). He would not understand her at all if not for another classmate of his, Hina's friend Higa Kana, who translates for him. Unbeknownst to Teruaki, Kana is head over heels in love with him, and has been translating for him as an excuse to get near him, though it usually fails as Teruaki only wants to be with Hina, not Kana. During his first days in Okinawa, Teruaki discovers a few things. First, he finds out that almost everyone in Okinawa has the "Higa" surname when everyone around him looked at him asking if he's referring to them when he called for Hina. When Kana suggested using the person's first name to call their attention, he tried calling her in a crowd with an honorific, only to end up embarrassing for her as it sounded like "I Love You" in Okinawan. Second, when he encounters a crying lost kid, Hina calmed him down with a chant called "Mabuigumi" while hugging him. It is said that when someone gets surprised, their "mabui" ("soul") falls out, causing the person to lose their strength. It can be restored by a "yuta" (Okinawan shaman) with the chant while patting them in the back. Teruaki, who got surprised himself, finds it the hard way that the method is different for older people, being patted in a rough, harder way. He also finds out how Okinawans say "goodbye". Third is the deal with the "Kamee Kamee Attack", a thing rooted in Okinawan hospitality. When he mentioned about never having sata andagi yet, everyone in his class went into a frenzy and, the next day, everyone gives him batches of the treat. That spread like wildfire to the other classes and even other schools, resulting in a boatload of sata andagi coming his way. Despite the hilarity, Teruaki thanks them all, and is happy to be in Okinawa.
2	"A Beach Party Is Just a Social Gathering?!"; Transliteration: "Bīchipāti de Shinboku-kai!?" (Japanese: ビーチパーティで親睦会！？)	Shingo Tanabe	Shingo Tanabe	Shingo Tanabe; Shin Itagaki	"Anata ni"	January 12, 2025
When Teeruu sees Hina staring at someone while mentioning about "ojisan" to Kana, he thought she has a thing for older men, and made worse when Kana also talks about "kisu" being delicious. He later finds out that these two words refer to fish. What Teeruu thought was staring was just Hana being quiet so as not to scare away the "ojisan". Teeruu later finds out about other Okinawan things, namely Uchiinaa Time and the fact that beach parties in Okinawa are social gatherings and do not involve any swimming at all, as "the sea is for watching;" not to mention, as Kana put it, it feels "muchamucha" ("sticky") to swim in the water. There they find out that some words they think are standard Japanese are, in fact, not. After school, Teeruu tries asking Hina to go somewhere when a "katabui", or an extremely localized thunderstorm, happened. He even finds out that everyone never uses an umbrella and likes to walk in the rain. When the rain becoming particularly stronger, Hina rushed home embarrassed as her clothes got really soaked. Later, Teeruu meets Kana at the same bench where he first met her during spring break, waiting for Hina and her siblings while they frolic in the beach. Here he also remembers how they first met—when two kids, who were Kana's siblings, gushed over the Weekly Shōnen Jump magazine he bought before leaving for Okinawa—a publication that comes a day late in Okinawa—thinking he is from the future. Kana developed a crush on him when Teeruu rushed to the waters to save her hat that got blown away by the strong breeze. Kana wondered when she will see him again, and was surprised when she finds out he is in the same class as her. Her shy self found a way to him when she becomes Hina's translator when she finds out he cannot understand Hina's Okinawan, but was ultimately disappointed when she realized he only has eyes for Hina, not her.
3	"Shiisaa and Eisaa"; Transliteration: "Shīsā to Eisā" (Japanese: シーサーとエイサー)	Shingo Tanabe; Shin Itagaki	Fuji Sasa	Shingo Tanabe; Shin Itagaki	"Anata ni"	January 19, 2025
Teeruu finds out that, even if he finds shisa statues as cute, shisa-faces are, in reality, considered "unattractive". He also learns about the intricacies of shisa figures installed in front of houses—the male shisa's mouth being open to catch the "majimun" and prevents it from going inside the house, while the female shisa's mouth is closed to prevent blessings from escaping. During lunch break at school, Teeruu is surprised to see everyone in class dancing the "kachaashi" to the tune of a folk song called the "Tooshin Dooi", a dance every Okinawan knows how to dance. Hana asks Kana to teach Teeruu how to dance the "kachaashii" so that there will be something he can teach his future grandsons, but she feels it is not the right time, as she imagines her teaching it to him only if they get married. After school, Teeruu also learns about the "parlors", small shacks selling Okinawan food and other treats. Kana considers it "naughty", since they do not want the teachers knowing that they're buying snacks after school hours. Hina ordered some zenzai, technically shaved ice. Unbeknownst to Kana, translating for Teeruu, Yae and their other classmates are around, and they catch on with what is going on between Kana, Hina, and Teeruu, putting Kana in an embarrassing situation. Festival season comes and Teeruu watches his classmates do the eisaa dance. Of interest to him is Hina dancing weirdly. Suzu, Kana's younger sister, explains that she is the "chondaraa". Not only is she making the festival look more fun, but she is practically the event's floormaster, making sure the performance goes smoothly, including setting the rhythm of the performance. After their performance, Teeruu mustered his guts to talk more earnestly to Hina about how he feels about her.
4	"Blow Your Finger Whistle at the Beautiful Sea!"; Transliteration: "Yubifue Narasou Churaumi de!" (Japanese: 指笛鳴らそう美ら海(ちゅらうみ)で！)	Noriko Hatta	Sasa Fuji	Noriko Hatta; Shin Itagaki	"Best Friend"	January 26, 2025
At the finale of the festival, a communal kachaashii, Kana notices Teeruu not dancing. Kana seized the opportunity to talk to him, and she reveals she likes to talk and be with him, practically telling him that she is in love with him, but he ignores this. It ends up with her getting flustered and a bit dismayed as she thought he wants to learn more about her and do things hands-on, only to find out it is about learning the culture. Kana ends up teaching Teeruu how to dance the kachaashii, anyway. A few days later, Teeruu learns about the aspect of "fiifii", or whistling, which islanders would do during occasions to accompany the sound of the sanshin, when Hina invites him over to the beach to teach him how to do it. It is kind of significant for Teeruu, as it is the same beach where Hina and Kana learned how to do it. Kana ends up teaching Teeruu (and Suzu) how to do it, as Hina is terrible at teaching it, and through Suzu's flailing/blackmailing that she would tell everyone what Kana says while sleep-talking. Yae, who was tagging along, is stifling her laughter as Kana is teaching him and the kids. Kana remembers how she learned the hard way to do the fiifii, that she almost gave up on how to learn it, even strengthening her friendship with Hina, continuing it even when they grow old, and proving her bully wrong, even getting impressed and even getting taught by the girls on how to do it.
5	"Kariyushi Wear By Mistake!"; Transliteration: "Kanchigai de Kariyushiu~ea!" (Japanese: 勘違いでかりゆしウェア！)	Chinatsu Hasegawa	Chinatsu Hasegawa; Shin Itagaki	Chinatsu Hasegawa	"Shimanchu nu Takara"	February 2, 2025
It has been four months since Teeruu first arrived in Okinawa, yet there are things he still is not used to, like, for instance, the word "Let's" means "I", and not really meaning you should go with or do something with another person. Teeruu also gets to learn the word "Kusukeehyaa", which is technically the Okinawan equivalent of saying "Bless you" when sneezing, only that it is caused by demons (called "Majimun") to make someone sneeze to cause their soul to leave their body, and someone tells those demons to "get out of the person". Kana blurted it when Teeruu sneezed, causing her to get flustered, as the term is a curse word, much to Yae's amusement. Speaking of the Majimun, Teeru learns from Hana about the many ways to rid of them, including the shisaa, the "suijigai" (another decoration that scares the majimun), and the "hinpun" and the "ishigantoo" (structures meant to stop any charging majimun). People Believe in them because they have something that is important to them. Hina gave Teeruu a "san", a knotted blade of susuki grass meant as an amulet to keep evil away, placed on food or stuck on gates or even in the fields. A "san" is usually given to someone the giver cares about. Summer break arrives, and Kana is bored, but she cannot muster the courage to invite Teeruu over. She did meet Teeruu on the way to shopping, which leads Teeruu to learn that buses in Okinawa are late, since the bus arrived on time. However, a misunderstanding happened when Kana says "Let's go shopping", and Teeru did come along. This flusters Kana to no end. At the mall, Teeruu gets to try "Kariyushi wear", which looks like a Hawaiian shirt but is actually Okinawan formal wear. He even learned how to distinguish the really formal ones from the fancy ones. Kana gets flustered when the salesman asks if Teeruu "wants a matching one for his girlfriend." Teeruu eventually learns about the misunderstanding, but thanks Kana anyway because he gets to hang out with her. At the community center, where they are doing radio calisthenics, he notices that kids say "Hmm" while interacting with each other, as a means of indicating that they're listening, confirming something, or while thinking of what to say next. It is here that he gets to meet Hina's grandmother, who's even more proficient in the Okinawan dialect. The calisthenics, in the dialect, is done with an incentive of earning stamps towards getting a sata andagi snack. Teeruu is interested as it is made by "Kyan-san", but it was Hina's grandmother who made them.
6	"I Want to Cry "Okinawa Soba"!"; Transliteration: "Okinawa Soba-tte Sakebitai!" (Japanese: 沖縄そばって叫びたい！)	Shingo Tanabe	Fuji Sasa	Shingo Tanabe; Shin Itagaki	"Anata ni"	February 9, 2025
Hina and Teeruu visits Kana on Uukui, the last day of Kyuubon (Obon). Here, Teeruu learns about the intricacies of the uukui, starting with the Uutootoo. Kana tells him, "Hizamazuki shite" (get on his knees), which is a local term meaning "assuming the seiza sitting position." Teeruu learns the significance of two sugarcane stalks offered at the altar. It is always two--one is used by the departed loved one as a means to carry gifts home, while the other is used as a walking cane on the way home, while carrying things in a "ganshinaa" on their heads. Part of the Uutootoo ritual is the giving of money to the departed, that is, burning Uchikabi, money that can be spent in Gusoo (the afterlife). Outside, Teeruu gets to witness a street junee, when people go around the streets in the village doing an Eisaa on Obon. As Teeruu and his friends eat at an Okinawa soba shop, he learns about its history, of how it was recognized as uniquely Okinawan. However, Teeruu underestimated the kōrēgusu hot sauce that is added to the dish, adding an entire bottle to his bowl, causing him to, according to Tetsu, be drunk, as the condiment is made by soaking island chili peppers in awamori. Teeruu became a bit loose-lipped around Hina and, with a bit of prodding from Yae, Kana; and never remembering anything from that scenario. On the hottest day of summer break, Teeruu thinks it is good to be on the beach and get a tan. Hina tells him that Okinawa's UV index is twice as that of Sapporo, since the waters act as mirrors concentrating the sunlight, which might cause actual burns (and not the usual sunburn). Teeruu becomes uneasy, though, when Hina showed her "shimazori" tan line on her foot. Seeing none on Kana, Hina thinks she has already grown up (as adults have lesser chances to wear shimazori slippers), putting Kana in an embarrassing situation. Teeruu also gets to experience his first Okinawan typhoon, He also finds out that, aside from grocery stores, Tsutaya (DVD rental places) are packed, as they can be watched even in the event of a power outage. Teeruu seems to have underestimated the Okinawan typhoon, not knowing that typhoons are actually stronger in Okinawa than in Kanto. He pigged out on snacks when he arrived home and fell asleep, only to wake up when the typhoon is raging outside. He forgot to prepare or even charge his phone as the power is shut off. Certain noises associated with the typhoon scared him. He then hears someone knocking at the door. It is Kana, coming to check on him, though he is a little disappointed it isn't Hina.
7	"Vipers and Mongooses"; Transliteration: "Habu to Mangūsu" (Japanese: ハブとマングース)	Noriko Hatta	Noriko Hatta	Noriko Hatta; Shin Itagaki	"Shimanchu nu Takara"	February 16, 2025
Kana and Hina, accompanied by Kana's older brother Tetsu, went to Teeru's apartment amidst the raging typhoon because of his last text message then he stopped responding, worrying them. They took Teeruu with them to the Higa residence, which leads him to find out about Super Union, the only supermarket in Okinawa that never closes even during a raging typhoon. However, even the Super Union is closed, which every Okinawan acknowledges as a sign that the typhoon is particularly strong. Kana served Teeruu some hirayaachii and soomin chanpuruu, a noodle dish typically served during big typhoons (as bread and cup noodles are the first to sell out before a typhoon). Kana had to shush Suzu from letting Teeruu know. Teeruu tells Kana about her alerting Tetsu about him not responding to texts (embarrassing her), thanking her for everything. Suddenly, the candle ran out, leading to another embarrassing situation for Kana when she finds herself getting too close to Teeruu. Teeruu is reminded of the venomous habu, and how Okinawa tried to get rid of them during the mid-1800s, at a time when antivenom did not exist, with mongooses. Even if the mongooses win, they are both equally matched and started avoiding each other to avoid risking a confrontation (as one of them is nocturnal and the other diurnal). The mongooses turned on the population of the yanbaru kuina, sharply decimating its population. There were efforts to increase their numbers, but are still considered endangered. Hina tells Teeruu not to go near a habu even if it is struck by a car (which accounts for most sightings), and also learns about the Y3,000 bounty for every habu surrendered to the city hall, and, with the exception of the sanshin, products made with the venomous vipers, including "habushu". Hina mentions that drinking habushi makes people "chaaganchuu", (gain stamina), which Kana misinterpreted it as "making people horny", much to her and Teeruu's embarrassment, when she meant it increases blood circulation, helping out with chills and speeding up metabolism. Over at Hina's house, Teeruu finds out about snack pineapples (Bogor pineapples) and the fact that Okinawans grow island bananas in their backyards, as they are considered shrubs. Teeruu tried a bit of showing off helping Hina's grandma and mother by harvesting a whole bunch, causing him to stain his clothes with the sap, a tough stain to remove. It is then that Hana's grandma calls him family (meaning "close friends", not meaning accepting him as a future husband). Teeru goes home shocked as the banana sap in his clothes turned into a blood-like stain. Teeruu later had a dream where Hina started learning standard Japanese and is interpreting for the dialect-speaking Kana, which is a reverse of reality.
8	"Yui Rail Rides to the Music!"; Transliteration: "Ongaku o Nosete Yui Rēru!" (Japanese: 音楽を乗せてゆいレール！)	Chinatsu Hasegawa	Chinatsu Hasegawa	Shin Itagaki & Chinatsu Hasegawa	"Best Friend"	February 23, 2025
It is Teeruu's first swim in Okinawan waters, and he discovers that Okinawans swim in their clothes. He also discovers nasty marine life lurking in the clear blue waters. A kid got stung by a gonzui, which Hina treats by sucking out the venom. Other dangerous fish include the datsu, sea snakes 70 times more venomous than a habu, the katsuonoeboshi, and the habukurage. Teeruu got stung by a habukurage, which Hina promply treats by dousing vinegar on the wound. Teeruu goes out one hot weekend as there are no radio calisthenics sessions. He chances upon Hina, Kana and Tetsu going on a little trip. He finds out that Okinawa is the only prefecture without trains, hence the proliferation of cars; though Naha has the Yui monorail. Hana mentions about the time Okinawa has a drive-through for everything. Not having breakfast, Kana is afraid Teeruu might hear her stomach growl, just as everyone is talking about food. But just as her stomach growled, so did Teeruu's, prompting Tetsu to treat them all at one of a few drive-in restaurants (different from a drive-through) in Japan, where the service crew brings the food to the cars, and either the customer eats their order inside their cars or takes them home. Hana mentions, though, about the downside of having a car-based society: increased obesity rates, because people use the car to beat the heat, which made Kana think about taking the next bite out of her burger and starting to eat her fries. When Tetsu tells Teeruu about the time Kana threw a tantrum when she cannot ride the monorail, Hina then later remembers Kana's first Yui Rail ride, when Hina herself took Kana to ride the Yui Rail, recreating scenes from a soap opera the latter watched. When Hina danced to the Toshin Dooi as the monorail arrives at its station, just as Kana is geeking out, it made her think she's too young for love. That is where Kana suggested to her about joining a youth club, since she likes dancing. Arriving home, they got an earful, but Hina indeed joined the youth club; though Hina is disappointed that Kana seems to have forgotten. Meanwhile, as Kana and Teeruu are chatting, Yae, the one girl in their class who knows who Kana is in love with, quietly expresses her little irritation about Kana being super shy and Teeruu being as dense as a brick, though finding it fun to see her get flustered. However, Yae is surprised Kana could simultaneously translate Hina's words, as it is said that it takes five years to learn to understand Okinawan and 10 years to learn to speak it.
9	"Amazing! The Iriomote Cat!"; Transliteration: "Sugoizo! Iriomote-yamaneko!" (Japanese: すごいぞ！イリオモテヤマネコ)	Shingo Tanabe	Fuji Sasa	Noriko Hatta; Shin Itagaki	"Anata ni"	March 2, 2025
Teeruu goes to buy chicken at a convenience store but finds the streets completely empty. Calling out, he discovers Hina, Kana, and Yae under a tree. The reason for the emptiness is the approaching Koushien season, with Okinawa's team playing. During past tournaments, such as in 2010 when an Okinawan team won both the spring and summer Koushien, the entire region stopped to watch, with people gathering at malls to see the finals on big screens. As Teeruu watches the game, he struggles with the difficult surnames of Okinawan players. Yae steps away, asking him to save her seat, leaving him next to an excited Kana. When an Okinawan batter scores a home run, Kana, overwhelmed with excitement, accidentally grabs Teeruu, leading to an awkward and embarrassing moment as Yae returns, witnessing the scene. A sudden katabui (thunderstorm) marooned Teeruu and his friends in a building, so they kill time by playing the Okinawan version of the shiritori word game, where the words must not end with "n". Here Teeruu learns about more details of the Okinawan language, like not using the vowels "e" and "o," using "i" and "u" in place of "e" and "o" respectively instead. Teeruu also learns that every part of Okinawa has their own dialect. Hina accidentally says something with an "n" at the end, results in her losing the game as the katabui ended, and her penalty is treating everyone to shaved ice. Later, Hina arrives at Kana's place to invite her over to the pool, and seeing Suzu absolutely trying to avoid eating her tomatoes. Hina tells her that if she did not eat her tomatoes, she would not be as strong as the iriomote cat (Yamapikaryaa) of Iriomote Island, a natural World Heritage Site. The story of the Iriomote cat's adaptation to the island's environment, which took 200,000 years, convinces Suzu to eat her tomatoes and be like it. During the last day of summer break, a test-of-courage activity is held at the community center. To set the mood, some of the participants tell ghost stories. Unfortunately, as Grandma Sachiko tells hers in the dialect, Teeruu has a hard time catching up with the story. Asking for help from Hina and Kana did not work as they are scared of hearing the stories. Yae's ghost story is the best of all, as her story genuinely scares everyone. Everyone starts picking their lots for the test of courage, and as Teeruu wonders what number Hina got, Kana reveals her number but he ignores it.
10	"The True Identity of the Yaaruu?!"; Transliteration: "Yārū no Shōtai to wa......!?" (Japanese: ヤールーの正体とは......！？)	Shingo Tanabe	Fuji Sasa	Noriko Hatta; Shin Itagaki	"Shimachu nu Takara"	March 9, 2025
As the rules for the test of courage is explained, Teeruu hopes he'd pair up with Hina, but he ends up with Kana, whose heart is racing but for reasons other than fright. Teeru is disappointed by this, as he didn't wanted to be paired with Kana, but reluctantly agrees. Along the way, they hear an Kuroiwa's ground gecko (Okinawan yaaruu) vocalizing, which surprised Teeruu because it is rare to hear a gecko vocalize. They later encounter their first two majimun--a cow and pig one. Kana mentions that you should not let these animal majimun between your legs or you'll die. But the scariest is Yae in a Sadako-like ghost that keeps coming at the two mumbling to them to "grab her" and "Kiss." The other "monsters" are panicking Yae is going overboard until another scary being popped behind Yae, prompting Teeruu to grab an already scared-stiff Kana by the hand and run away. As they reach the meeting spot, the two find out that it was Uema and Takaesu who did the cow and pig majimun, and Yae with that scary girl one. The last one is done by Shimoji--it was a "paantoo", a scary-looking visitor god and a protector god from Miyakojima. Teeruu also found about them planning to reveal themselves just as Shimoji in his costume scares Yae away. Kana goes home grinning, holding the hand Teeruu grabbed when they ran away. As Tetsu fixed Teeru's bike, all rusted due to salt exposure during the typhoon, he learns that most Okinawans don't ride bikes, and Okinawa has the least number of bike shops in all of Japan. Hina and Kana advised him to wash things exposed to the sea's salt, especially after a typhoon, to mitigate the effects of salt exposure. Even so, he wished they'd all go for a bike ride, but when Hina rides Teeruu's bike, she stumbles because Okinawa's roads are slippery from the salt and the reef coral used to make the roads. Trouble is, Hana fell on the sand, not the road, making her fumble more of an excuse, as Hina does not know how to ride one, as Okinawa has the least number of people who knows how to ride a bike. Just as second term comes, Teeruu wants to retrospect, but all he remembers is his most shocking moments, which makes him feel as if he's embarrassing himself in front of the girl he likes and swears not to be surprised by things anymore, though not for long as he is surprised by the sound and size of the Oshima cicadas making a bird-like noise. There are other two cicadas in Okinawa, the Kuroiwa nii-nii and the Ryukyu Abura; And that cicadas sing every November. He also finds out that Okinawans go to the sea because they're bored, so they talk to one another to avoid getting lonely. Teeruu is grateful for his new friends at high school.
11	"Goya? Gooyaa?"; Transliteration: "Gōya? Gōyā?" (Japanese: ゴーヤ？ゴーヤー？)	Chinatsu Hasegawa	Shingo Tanabe	Shingo Tanabe & Shin Itagaki	"Best Friend"	March 16, 2025
Teeruu arrives at the supermarket to find everyone, including Hina and Kana, listening for something. Just then, a whistle is heard--signifying the arrival of the Shima Tofu delivery man. Okinawans love their tofu so much that they know the delivery man's arrival as schedules are posted at the supermarket. Teeruu also finds out that the tofu arrives in bags piping hot due to sanitation laws. Hina invites Teeruu over at Kana's house for a tofu cookout, where Kana's grandmother made a full course, with Jiimamii Tofu as dessert. Hina and Kana are also shocked to see Teeruu drunk from the tofu-yoo (tofu pickled in awamori) Suzu gave him. As they wait for Teeruu to come around, Hina retells the story of when Hina and Kana served Yushi tofu for the latter's grandmother. However, Kana tripped on the way out of the supermarket, spilling the Yushi tofu, but salvaged some, though, to make some sort of soup. Her grandma, proud of what the girls did, appreciated it saying it's "nuchigusui" ("the medicine of life"). During Home Economics class, Teeruu is "arrested" by the Gooya Police for pronouncing "gooya" with a short "o." Hina also finds out that its official name is "nigauri", as "gooya" is the dialect form. A little bit of showboating and Teeruu is in a pinch understanding certain cooking terms in Okinawan, even opening a can that uses a key to open it, which Kana helps him out with. Teeruu also finds out the other meaning of "shirishiri" ("slice")--that is, getting close to someone. Yae uses it to tease Kana, mentioning the term "takkuwaimukkuwai" ("press against each other"), but Hina beats her to it, pushing Teeru and Kana towards each other, much to their embarrassment, as Teeru immediately pushes himself away from Kana. Teeruu also learns about the concept of Moai, the Okinawan version of a money circle, usually for the purpose of eating out with their moai buddies. Tetsu used the concept to tell Teeruu to do it someday with friends. Hina then asks Teeruu and her friends to do it when they graduate. The next day, after school, Yae pointed out a bit frustrated to Kana that she's been getting lazy lately with dealing with Teeruu, and warns her things will change, they see Teeruu seemingly confessing to Hina as they returned to their classroom, leaving Kana devastated.
12	"Anshee Matayaa! (See You Again Sometime!)"; Transliteration: "Anshiē Mata yā (Sore jā Mata ne)" (Japanese: あんしぇーまたやー （それじゃあまたね）)	Shingo Tanabe	Shingo Tanabe	Shingo Tanabe & Shin Itagaki	"Shimachu nu Takara"	March 23, 2025
Hina, an old-fashioned Okinawan girl, runs out of the room, shy and embarrassed, and trying to avoid Teeruu, thinking he is proposing to her, knowing what the pattern of the cloth on the minsa-weave handkerchief he gave her means, as her late grandfather told her. Teeru beings to think she rejected him, and feels a little heartbroken. To Hina's dismay, though, all of his male friends got one too. The reason is that Teeruu's dad got a whole box of them from his business trips, and told him that he can give it to his classmates and friends. Sachiko had a laugh seeing the handkerchief from her granddaughter, because, supposedly, girls give them to the boys they love, mortifying Hina even more, as she doesn't like the idea of being in a relationship. Teeruu and his friends join Hina, Kana, and Yae to the sanshin store because Kana is going to get her sanshin. Teeruu learns about the Ryukyu musical scale, and, hearing Kana play, wanted one. All he can afford, though, is the kankara sanshin, a kit of which is being sold by the store. There he learned the value of the kankara sanshin, as a means of lifting the morale of Okinawans during the war. As Teeruu plays his sanshin with Kana's guidance, the old timer behind the store counter remembers when he learned to play the instrument. Hina and Kana took Teeruu, who is under the weather, to Chinen, a yuta, thinking he might dropped one of his seven mabui. As Chinen says all of his mabui are present, Hina remembers the first time she and Kana met Chinen's yuta instructor, learning about the powers and responsibilities of a yuta. She also mentions that one of them has a faraway "en" (connection/bond) but was not able to mention who has it because she fell asleep. Either way, it did not matter to Hina because she is still connected to Kana as they're friends forever. Kana is happy about this, but is still heartbroken by the fact that Teeru is not interested in her.

== See also ==
- Hokkaido Gals Are Super Adorable! – another manga series with a similar concept
