= Soki =

Okinawan stewed pork spare ribs

Sōki
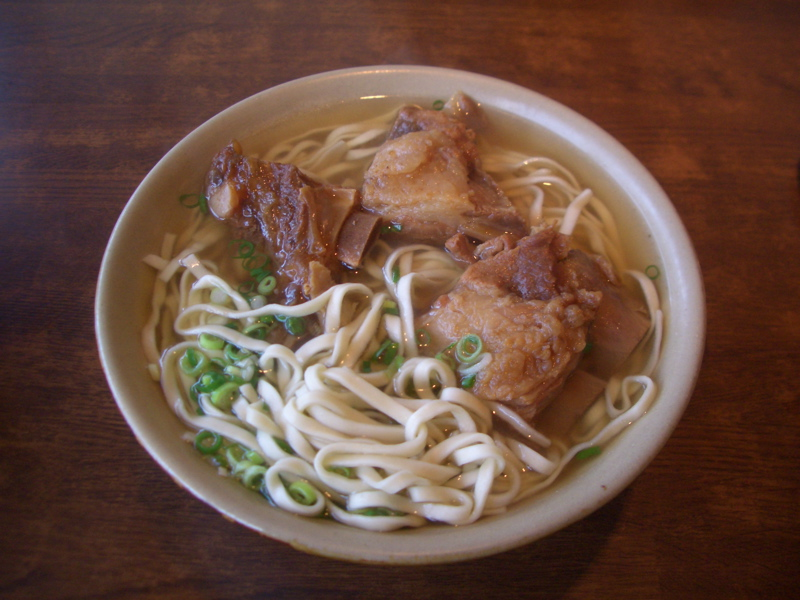
- A bowl of sōki soba noodles
- Region or state: Okinawa Prefecture, Japan
- Main ingredients: Spare ribs

Sōki (Okinawan: ソーキ) is an ingredient of Okinawan cuisine. Sōki are (usually boneless) stewed pork spare ribs, with the cartilage still attached. They are often served with Okinawa soba (called suba).

== Dishes ==
=== Sōki soba ===
Okinawa soba with stewed sōki on top. The sōki are prepared by first boiling to remove excess fat, then stewing in a mixture of awamori, to soften the meat, soy sauce, and sugar for three to four hours. They are then placed in a bowl of soba.

=== Sōki jiru ===
Soup containing sōki, konbu (edible seaweed), and daikon (Japanese radish), with salt and soy sauce for flavoring. The sōki are first boiled to remove excess fat and drippings, then stewed in the soup until tender.

In Japan, konbu is usually used just for flavoring and then discarded, but a distinctive feature of Okinawan soups is that the konbu is left in.
