= Hearts Grow =

Japanese band

- Origin: Japan
- Genres: Pop rock; alternative rock
- Years active: 2006–2009
- Label: Epic Records Japan
- Members: Chiaki; Haruna; Natsumi; Shintarō; Yūsuke
- Past members: Yūya

Hearts Grow was a Japanese band from Motobu, Okinawa. Their first single Grow!! was released independently (in limited quantities) on 19 April 2006. Hearts Grow made their major label debut on 18 October 2006, with the release of their first single Road. Their second single Yurayura (ユラユラ) was released in Japan on 6 December 2006. They are known for performing the ninth opening of Naruto, the fourth ending of Demashita! Powerpuff Girls Z, the fourth opening for Gintama and the first opening of Tetsuwan Birdy: Decode.

As of late 2010 the band has been on an indefinite hiatus. The lead singer Haruna plans on a solo career.

== Band members ==
Name	Japanese name	Instrument	Birth date
Haruna	ハルナ	Vocal	27 October 1986
Chiaki	チアキ	Keyboards & Vocal	23 October 1986
Natsumi	ナツミ	Guitar	24 May 1986
Shintarō	シンタロウ	Guitar	15 February 1987
Yūsuke	ユウスケ	Bass & Backup vocal	17 February 1988
Yūya	ユウヤ	Drums	26 January 1987

== Discography ==
=== Mini-Albums ===
Single	Title	Tracks	Release date
1st	ハーツグロウ Hearts Grow	Futari (ふたり); Smile; Tsuyoku (強く); Human's Hearts	14 February 2005
2nd	Grow!!	Grow; Smile; Futari (ふたり); Kame (カメ)	19 April 2006
3rd	サマーチャンプルー Summer Chanpuru	Chiisa na Koi no Uta (小さな恋のうた); Himawari-Chanpuu, Rafutei, Spam Mix (ひまわり-ちゃんぷるう、らふてい、スパム Mix); Shimanchu nu Takara (島人ぬ宝); Road-Sweet Fuchagi Mix; BestFriend; Yurayura - Ryukyu HAYASHI Mix (ユラユラ)	22 August 2007

=== Singles ===
Single	Title	Tracks	Release date
1st	Road	1. Road; 2. Red Skateboard (赤いスケボー, Akai Sukebō); 3. Road (Instrumental)	18 October 2006
2nd	ユラユラ Yurayura	1. Yurayura (ユラユラ); 2. Story (物語, Monogatari); 3. Yurayura (Instrumental)	6 December 2006
3rd	ひまわり Himawari	1. Himawari; 2. Natsuiro (夏色); 3. Himawari (Instrumental)	13 June 2007
4th	かさなる影 Kasanaru Kage	1. Kasanaru Kage; 2. Sorairo (ソライロ); 3. Yell (エール); 4. Kasanaru Kage (Instrumental)	23 January 2008
5th	そら Sora	1. Sora(そら); 2. Sora (Instrumental); 3. Mirai Sketch (未来スケッチ, Mirai Sukecchi)	3 September 2008
