= Sobá =

Brazilian noodle dish

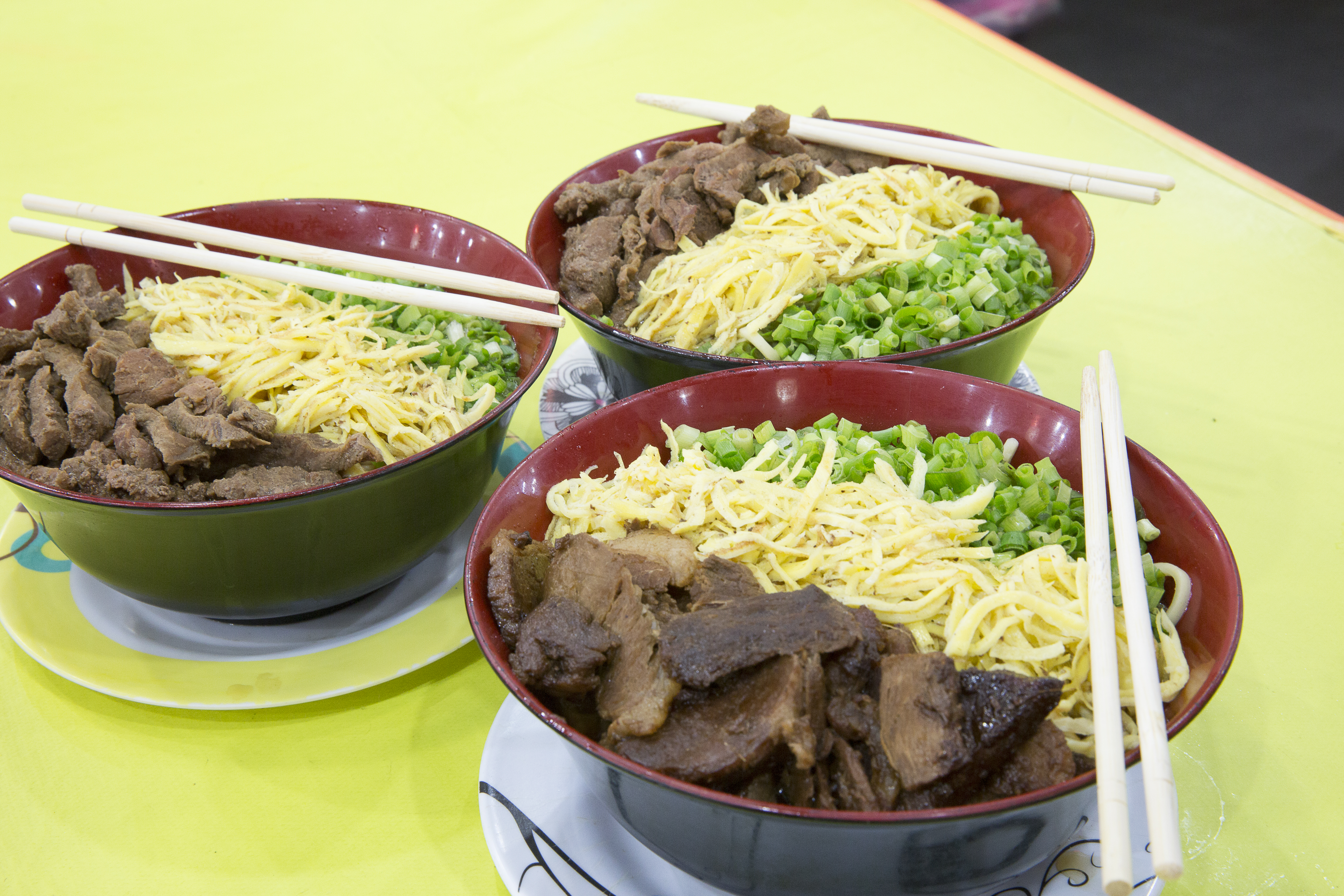
- Three bowls of sobá served at the Central Fair of Campo Grande
- Type: Noodle soup
- Place of origin: Okinawa, Japan (origin); Brazil (adaptation)
- Region or state: Mato Grosso do Sul
- Associated cuisine: Brazilian cuisine
- Main ingredients: Noodles (wheat flour), meat-based broth, beef, omelette strips, and green onion

Sobá is a dish from the Brazilian state of Mato Grosso do Sul that is an adaption of Okinawa soba. It is made with wheat noodles, beef, green onion, and omelette strips. The dish is popular in Campo Grande, the capital city of Mato Grosso do Sul, where it is a recognized symbol of the city and the subject of an annual festival.

== Origin and background ==
The modern day Brazilian sobá is an adaption of the soba that Okinawan immigrants to Brazil brought with them when they arrived in Campo Grande. Okinawan immigrants arrived in Campo Grande in 1914, 15 years after the foundation of the city in 1899. As of 2023, Campo Grande has the 3rd largest Japanese Brazilian and 2nd largest Okinawan Brazilian community in Brazil with 11,000 people of Japanese descent. 70% of Campo Grande's Japanese Brazilian community is of Okinawan descent.

According to the Okinawa Association of Campo Grande (Associação Okinawa de Campo Grande), prominent Okinawan immigrant Eiho Tomoyose was the first to serve soba in Campo Grande at his bar in the 1950s. Despite initially only serving the Okinawan community in the area, Tomoyose was serving his soba at the Central Fair of Campo Grande to Brazilians by the mid-1960s. The dish became so popular that it soon became the principal attraction at the fair's eatery.

The modern-day sobá that is found in Campo Grande and throughout Brazil has been adapted to the Brazilian palate by substituting beef for the traditional pork and changing the seasoning of the broth. Like Okinawa soba, sobá uses noodles made from wheat flour, instead of the buckwheat soba noodles used in Japan, and includes green onion and omelette strips.

== Cultural impact ==
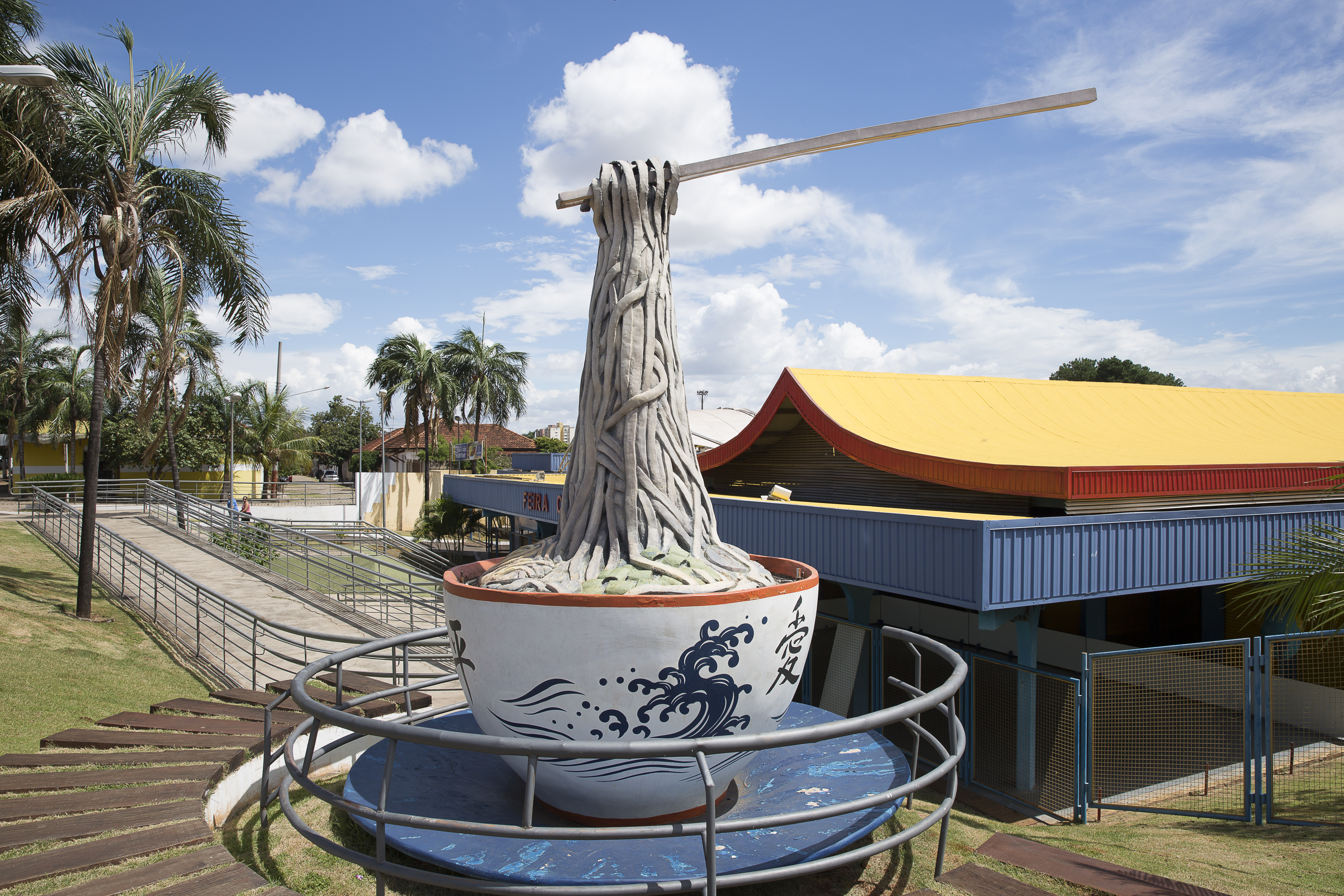
The Sobá Monument in the Central Fair of Campo Grande, location of the annual Sobá Festival

On 10 August 2006, sobá was registered with the National Institute of Historic and Artistic Heritage as an Intangible Cultural Property (Bem Cultural de Natureza Imaterial) of Campo Grande by Municipal Degree n° 9.685 of 18 July 2006. A contest started on 21 October 2017 to determine the representative dish (prato típico) of Campo Grande presented residents with the choice between arroz carreteiro, espetinhos, and sobá. After the voting period closed on 21 January 2018, sobá won by winning 41% of the over 15,000 votes. Arroz carreteiro and espetinhos came in at 27% and 32% of the vote, respectively. On 7 August 2018, the owners of 70 Campo Grande sobá restaurants met with Campo Grande officials to officially determine a recipe for sobá. At this meeting, they also discussed the possibility of creating an official seal that restaurants could display to show that they serve the official sobá recipe.

The first Sobá Festival (Festival do Sobá) was held in Campo Grande in 2010. The event is held annually in August in the Central Fair of Campo Grande. The festival has events like live music, dancing, and workshops to show the cultural wealth that Japanese, indigenous, gaucho and Center-West Brazilians have contributed to Campo Grande.The festival is a popular attraction in the city and drives domestic tourism. The Government of Mato Grosso do Sul estimated that the 2023 festival would be attended by 100,000 people over the five days of the festival.

In 2018, a news segment on the Japanese Ryukyu Broadcasting Corporation compared the differences between the traditional Okinawan soba and the sobá from Mato Grosso do Sul.
