= Shimanchu nu Takara =

Single by Begin

Single by Begin

from the album Begin no Shima Uta: Omoto Takeo 2
- Released: May 22, 2002
- Genre: J-pop, rock
- Length: 5:20
- Label: Teichiku
- Songwriter: Begin

Begin singles chronology
"Bottle Nihon to Chocolate" (2002)	"Shimanchu nu Takara" (2002)	"Nada Sōsō/Shimanchu nu Takara" (2002)

Begin singles chronology
"Shimanchu nu Takara" (2002)	"Nada Sōsō/Shimanchu nu Takara" (2002)	"Ojii Jiman no Orion Beer (Eisa Version)" (2003)

"Shimanchu nu Takara" (島人(しまんちゅ)ぬ宝(たから); Okinawan for "Treasure of the Islanders") is a song by Okinawa-based J-pop band Begin. It reached number 47 on the Oricon weekly charts and the band performed the song on NHK's 53rd annual Kōhaku Uta Gassen in 2002. It has become a song iconic of Okinawa Prefecture due to its use of eisa-inspired chanting. Its B-side, which begins with "Soredemo Kurashi wa..." is noted as being one of the longest song titles in Japan.

== Background and release ==
Eishō Higa, the band's vocalist, revealed that the song was created following a dispute among students on whether "My Way" or Southern All Stars' "Yaya" would be the graduation song for Ishigaki Middle High School in 2001. His friend asked his second-year classmates about their feelings about Ishigaki Island. The answer, such as "grandpa and grandma are treasures" and "The sea is a treasure". After noticing that the word "treasure" was popping up everywhere, and thought, "They call the island a 'treasure'?". (Note: Attributed to multiple sources:)

The song features various Okinawan elements such as the use of sanshin and the Okinawan way of life. Yoh of Orange Range said that the song is about "how the people of Okinawa have lived, their roots. There were tough times, but it's a song that teaches you to live with a smile and be cheerful."

The song was released on May 22, 2002 and it was performed in the NHK's 53rd annual Kōhaku Uta Gassen in the same year.

== Track listing ==
All tracks are written by Begin, unless otherwise noted.

No.	Title	Writer(s)	Length
1.	"Shimanchu nu Takara" (島人ぬ宝)	Begin	5:20
2.	"Nami" (波, "Wave")	Donto	5:04
3.	"Soredemo Kurashi wa Tsuzuku kara, Subete o, Ima, Wasureteshimau Tame ni wa, Subete o, Ima, Shitteiru Koto ga Jōken de, Boku ni wa Totemo Muri dakara, Hitotsuzutsu Wasureteiku Tame ni, Aisuru Hitotachi to Te o Tori, Wakeatte, Semete Omoidasanai Yō ni, Kurashi o Tsuzuketeiku no Desu" (それでも暮らしは続くから 全てを 今 忘れてしまう為には 全てを 今 知っている事が条件で 僕にはとても無理だから 一つづつ忘れて行く為に 愛する人達と手を取り 分けあって せめて思い出さないように 暮らしを続けていくのです, "Still We Live, All of Us, Now, in Order to Forget, Everything, Now, to Know the Reason, Because It Is Out of the Question for Me, in Order to Forget One by One, Holding Hands with the People You Love, Divided, so as to at Least Not Remember, That We Will Continue to Live")	Begin	4:19
4.	"Shimanchu nu Takara" (Original Karaoke)		5:19
Total length:			20:00

== Commercial performance ==
The song charted in Oricon's Single CD Sales ranking 60 times and peaked at 47th.

== Cover versions ==
Because of the popularity of "Shimanchu nu Takara", it has been covered many times, including by Allister on the EP Guilty Pleasures, by Hearts Grow on their album Summer Chanpuru, by Yanawaraba for their album Nagiuta. by Speed member Hiroko Shimabukuro on her solo album Watashi no Okinawa, and, by Beni on her album.Covers 3. Akari Kito and Fairouz Ai sung a version of the song in their respective character serving as the first ending for the 2025 anime series Okitsura.

On the band's 30th anniversary of the band in 2020, "Shimanchu nu Takara" was sung by various people from Ishigaki Island.

== Live performance ==
During conclusion of the Begin's Sanishan Sango Show!! -35th Anniversary Music Brigade Tour-, they perform the song in their hometown of Ishigaki Island.

== Charts ==
Weekly chart performance for "Shimanchu nu Takara"
Chart	Peak
Japan Single CD Sales (Oricon)	47

== See also ==
- Okinawan music
- Tooshin Dooi
