= Habushu =

Awamori-based liqueur made in the Ryukyu Islands

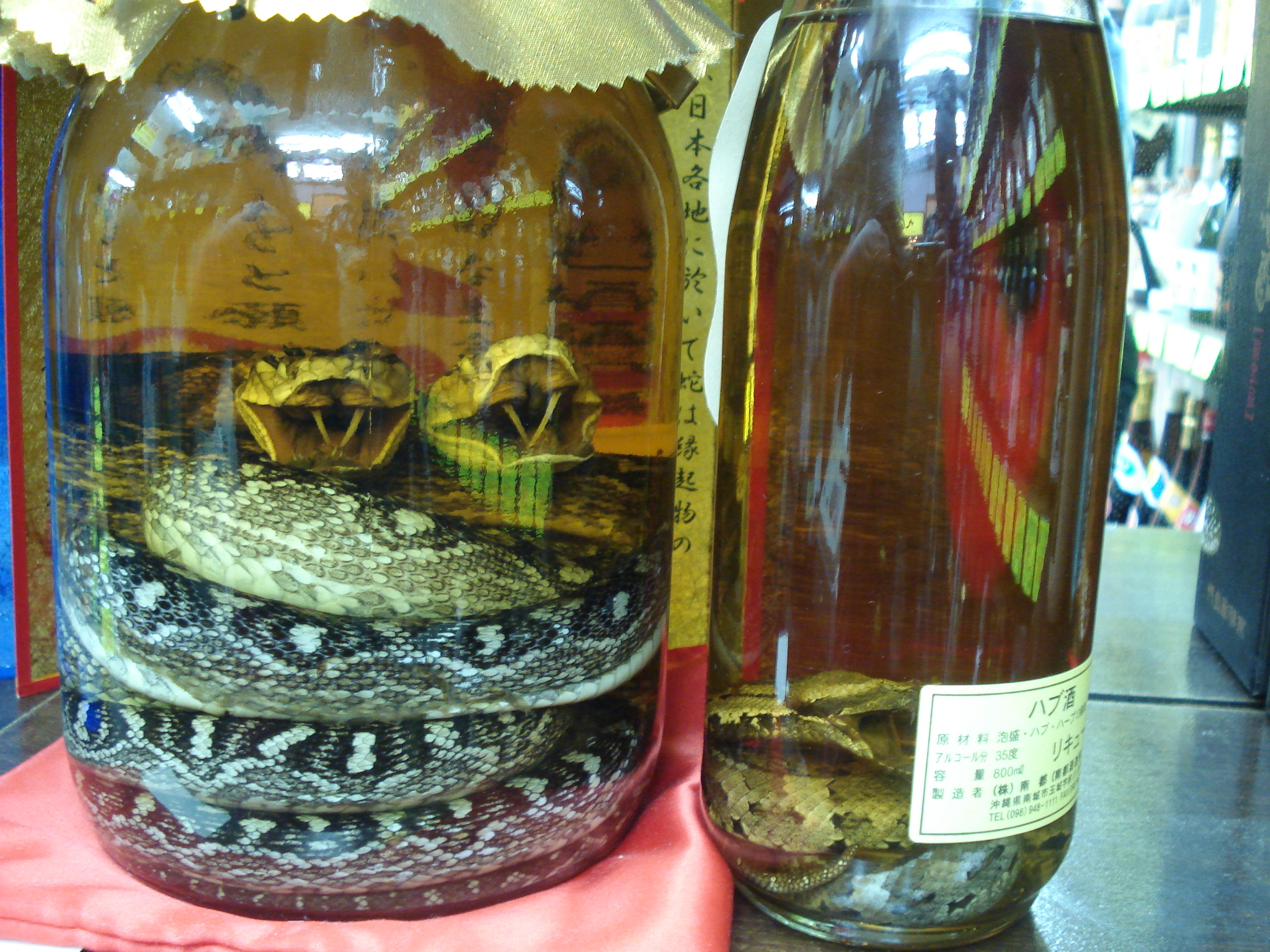
Pit vipers immersed in a bottle of habushu

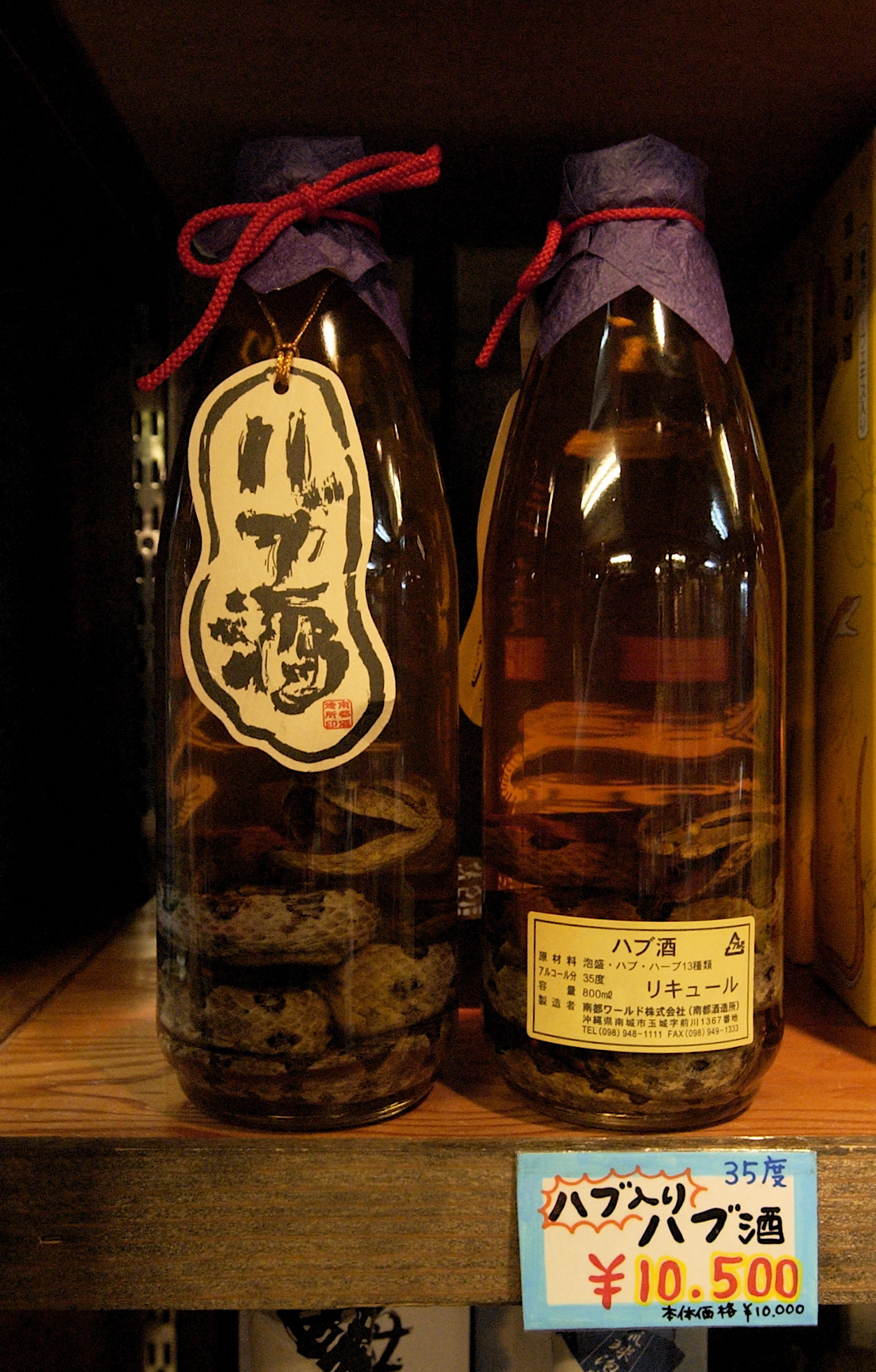
Bottles of habushu

Habushu (ハブ酒) is an awamori-based liqueur made in the Ryukyu Islands. Other common names include habu sake or Okinawan snake wine. Habushu is named after the habu snake, Protobothrops flavoviridis, which belongs to the pit viper subfamily of vipers, and is closely related to the rattlesnake and copperhead. Like all vipers, Habu snakes are venomous. These snakes are native to parts of Southeast Asia, including large island groups such as the Philippines, Ryukyus, and Japan.

== Production ==
A main distributor of habushu uses around 5,000 habu per year. The distillery uses crushed rice and Koji mold to produce the awamori that goes into the habushu. The awamori is first mixed with herbs and honey giving the clear liquid a yellow hue. A pit viper is then inserted into the liquid and stored until consumed. It is a typical practice to age the awamori for a long period of time. The alcohol helps the venom to dissolve and become non-poisonous. Some brands of habushu come with the snake still inside the bottle which is mixed with honey and herbs.

There are two methods of inserting the snake into the alcohol. The maker may choose to simply submerge the snake in the alcohol and seal the bottle, thus drowning the snake. Alternatively, the snake may be put on ice until it passes out, at which point it is gutted, bled and sewn up. When the viper is thawed and awakens, it will quickly die in an aggressive striking manner, which is what most producers look for. The manufacturer will then put the habu in an ethanol bath for a month to preserve it. To continue the process, the habu is put in a 59% alcohol mix for 40 days and finally put in a 35% awamori mix to prepare for consumption. Removing the intestines of the snake, as in the second method, is thought to decrease the drink's particularly unpleasant smell.

A habu snake is able to mate for as long as 26 hours, which causes some to believe that a drink of habushu may help sexual dysfunction in men. A common superstition is that these strengths are passed on to those who drink habushu.

== See also ==
- Snake wine
- Okinawan cuisine
- Awamori
