= Kōrēgusu =

Okinawan chili sauce

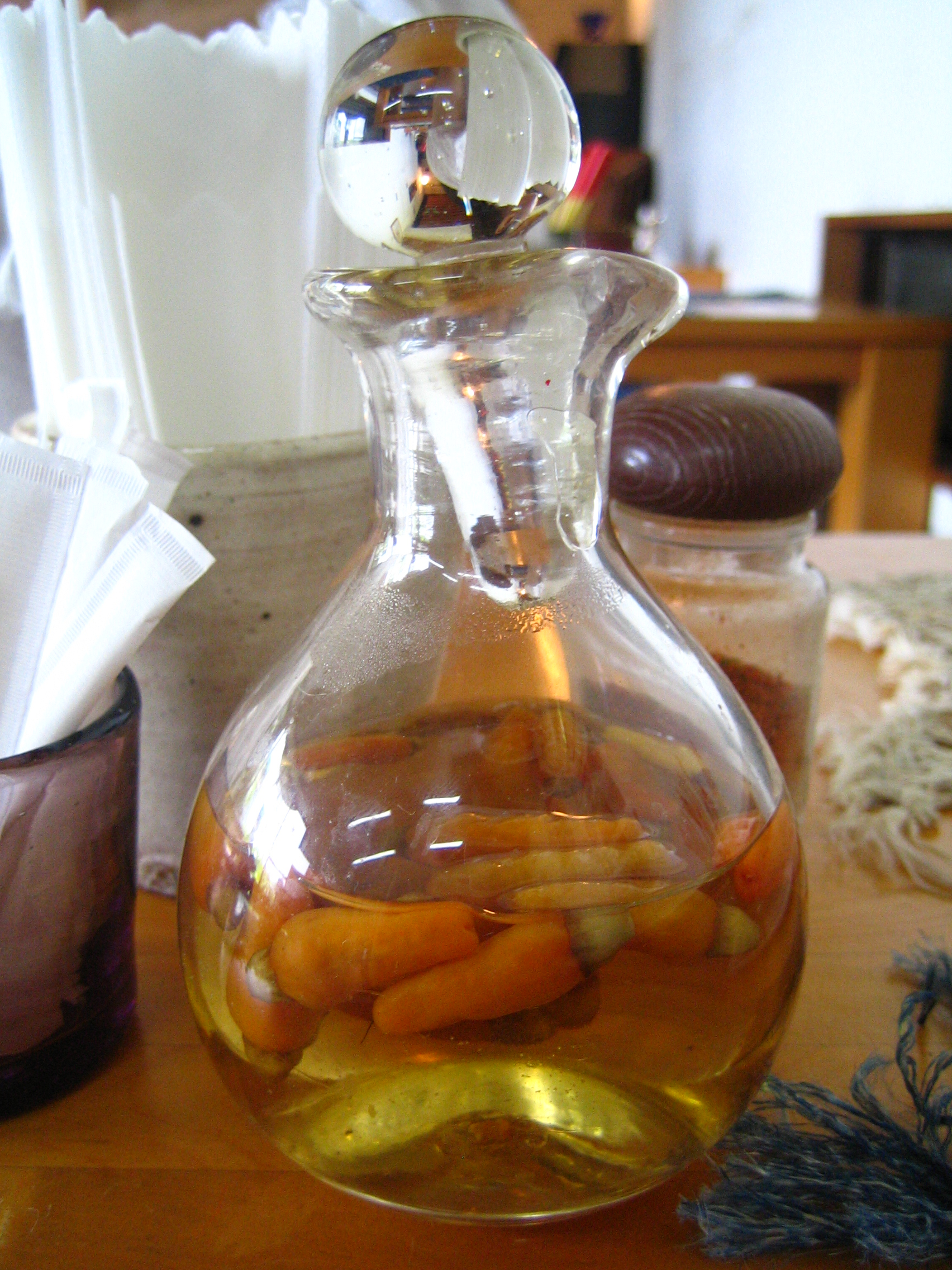
- Alternative names: コーレーグス
- Type: Sauce
- Place of origin: Japan
- Region or state: Okinawa
- Main ingredients: Chilli
- Ingredients generally used: Awamori

Kōrēgusu (Okinawan: コーレーグス/高麗胡椒, a type of hot chili pepper), also called kōrēgūsu (コーレーグース) and kōrēgusū (コーレーグスー), is a type of Ryukyuan chili sauce made of chilis infused in Awamori rice spirit and is a popular condiment to Okinawan dishes such as Okinawa soba.

== Etymology and background ==
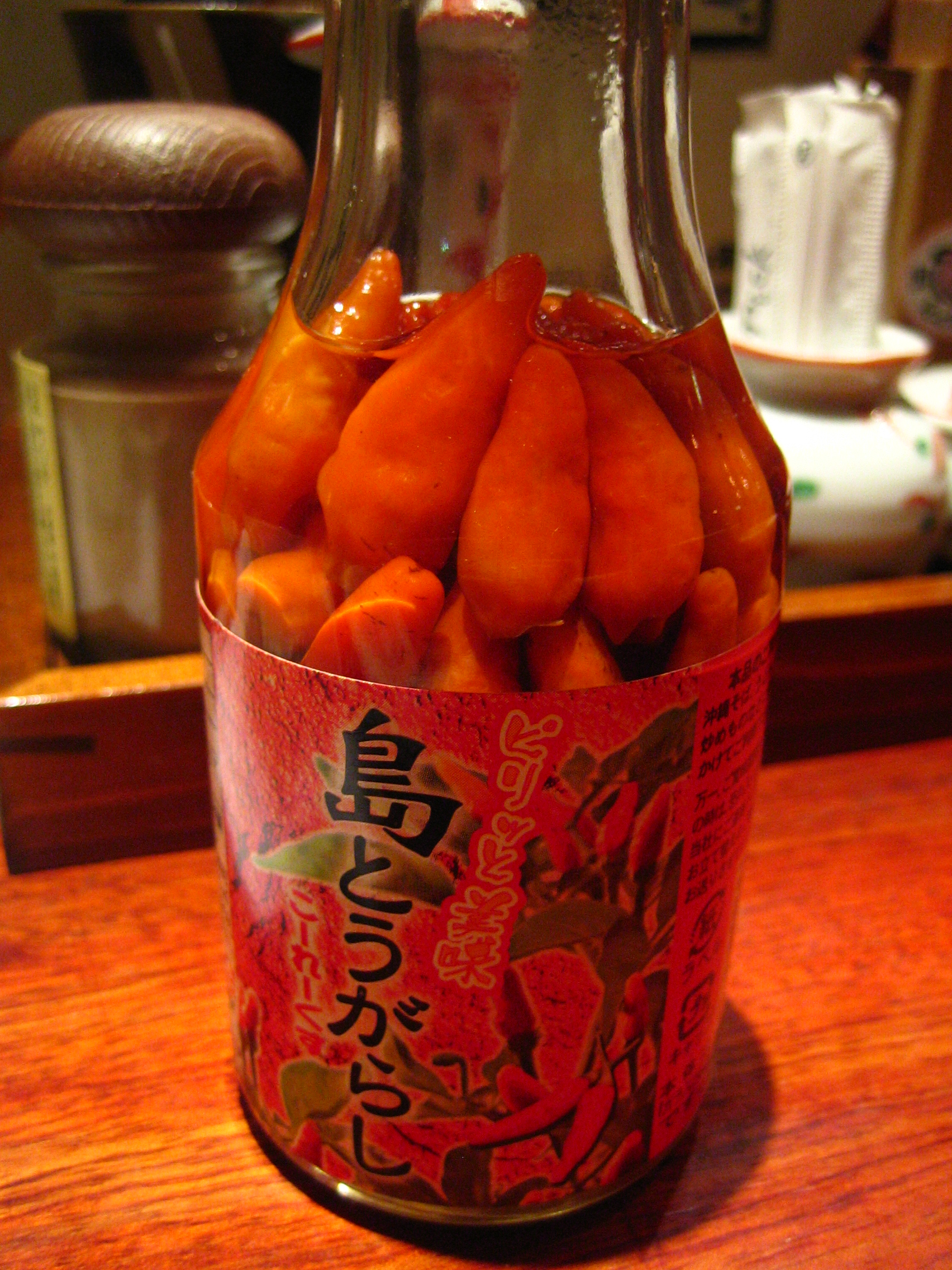

Since at least the 16th century, the term "Goryeo pepper" has been used for varieties of the frutescens chili (and this usage is retained in some Kyushu dialects). In the Okinawan language, kōrēgusu (高麗胡椒 こーれーぐす) still refers to the chili pepper itself but in Japanese, the term is applied to the awamori chili sauce while shima tōgarashi (島唐辛子, literally "island chili pepper") is used for the chili.

According to the Ryūkyū-koku yurai-ki, the chili was introduced by the Satsuma in the 18th century. There is a theory that the chili sauce might have been developed from Hawaiian chili pepper water by returning Ryukyuan migrants but its exact origin is unknown.

== Preparation and uses ==
The chili peppers are washed and then soaked in awamori for at least 10 days. Kōrēgusu is a commercial product (with added vinegar and citric acid), but is also often homemade. The sauce is long-lasting but the liquid will eventually become cloudy and should be discarded.

Some varieties of kōrēgusu are made with vinegar or soy sauce instead of awamori. In Miyako-jima and some of the other Sakishima Islands, it is also common to use crushed chilis or to form a paste by mixing it with garlic.

Kōrēgusu is a common tabletop condiment in the Ryukyus, used on Okinawa soba, chanpurū, irichii, sashimi and miso soup. Due to its alcohol content and low viscosity, kōrēgusu can dramatically change the flavor of a dish even in a small amounts so judicious use is desirable.
