= Tooshin Dooi =

Okinawan folk song

Song
- Language: Okinawan
- Genre: Okinawan folk

Audio sample
- First verse: file; help

"Tooshin Dooi" or "Tōshin Dōi" (Okinawan: 唐船ドーイ, lit. 'A Tang [Chinese] ship is coming') is an Okinawan folk song. It is a popular eisa song and is typically played at the end of Okinawan music festivals.

In the 14th century, the Ryukyuans became a tributary state of China, causing extensive trade to occur between the Ryukyu Kingdom and the Ming dynasty. "Tooshin Dooi" was often performed when Chinese ships arrived in Okinawa to trade with locals.

== Lyrics ==
There are many variants of "Tooshin Dooi", with singers choosing their own verses beyond the first. The first verse remains the same across all versions, and describes the grandfather of a man from Wakasamachi village (若狭町村) named Shinafa (瀬名波). While the rest of the village is excited by the arrival of the Chinese ships and run off to the port of Nafa (Naha), Shinafa's grandfather remains calm and does not run. It is left to the singer to explain in the subsequent lyrics why Shinafa's grandfather remains calm.

First verse of "Tooshin Dooi"
Okinawan

唐船(とーしん)ドーイさんてーまん いっさん走(ば)えーならんしや（ユイヤネ）
若狭町村(わかさまちむら)ね（サー）瀬名波(しなふぁ)ぬ爺(たんめー)（ハイヤ センスル ユイヤナー）

Okinawan romanisation

Tooshin Dooi santeeman issanhaaee naranshiya (yuiyana)
Wakasamachimura nu (saa) Shinafa nu tanmee (haiya sensuru yuiyana)

Japanese translation

唐船が来たぞと騒いでも 一目散に走らないのは（ユイヤネ）
若狭町村の（サー）瀬名波のおじいさん（ハイヤ センスル ユイヤナー）

English translation

Even when they shout that a Chinese ship is coming,
The grandfather of Shinafa in Wakasamachi village does not run off at full speed.

== See also ==
- "Shimanchu nu Takara"
