= Awamori =

Distilled alcoholic beverage from Ryukyu Islands

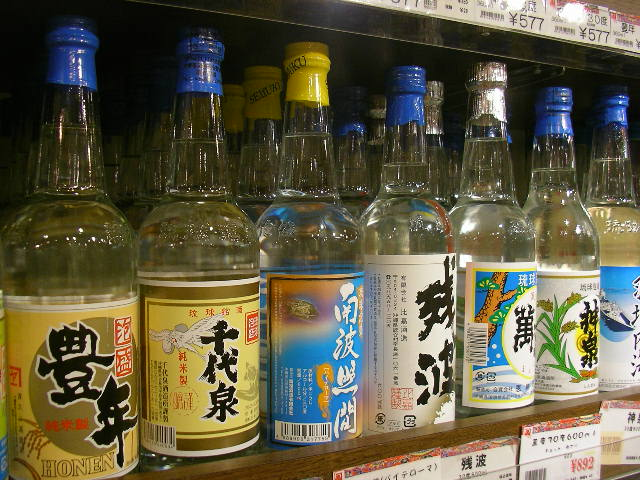
Various brands of awamori displayed in a shop

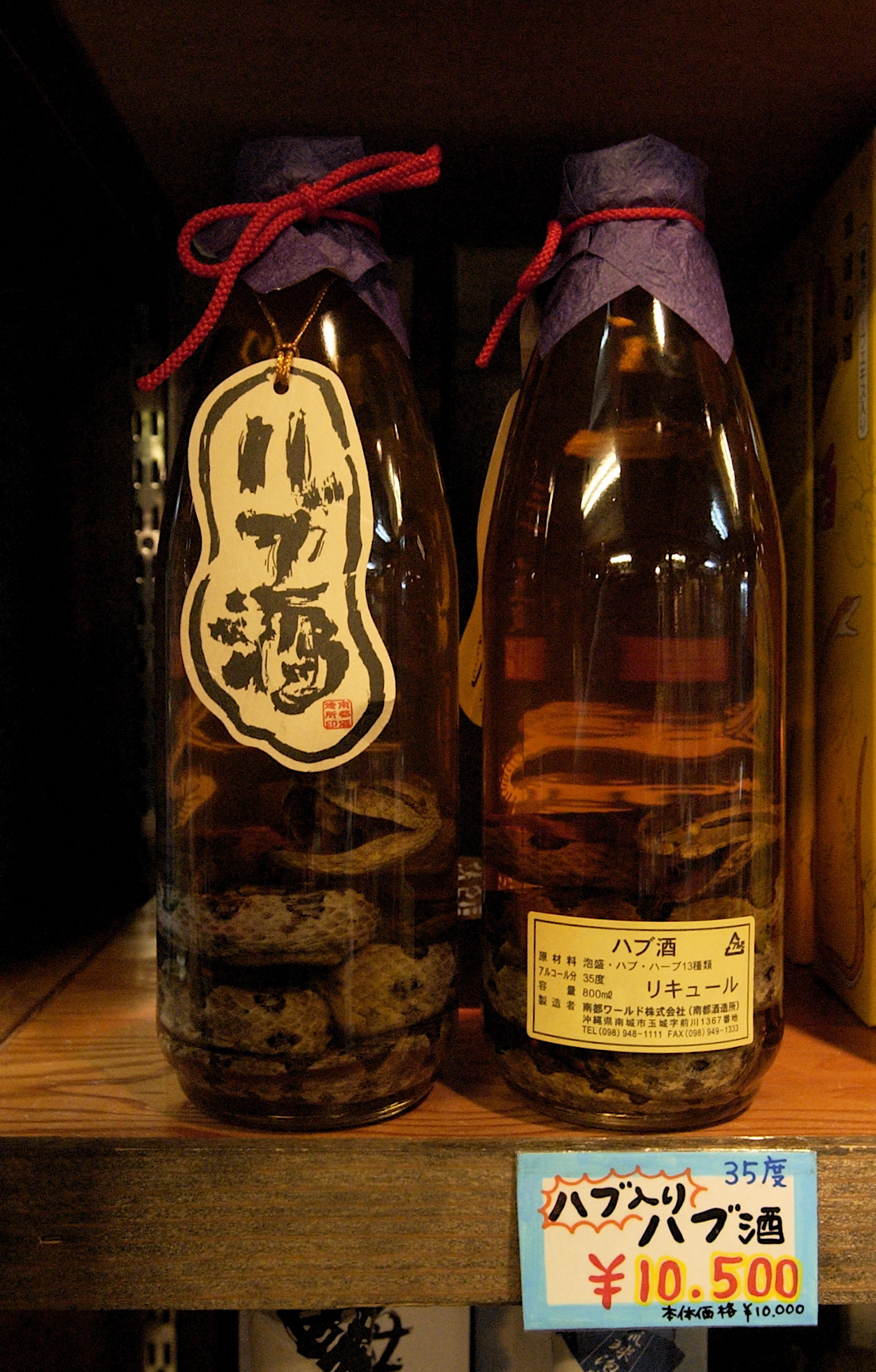
Habushu, a version of awamori bottled with habu vipers

Awamori (Japanese: 泡盛; Okinawan: アームイ, āmui, aamui) is an alcoholic beverage indigenous and unique to the Ryukyuan cuisine of Okinawa Prefecture, Japan. It is made from rice and is not a direct product of brewing (like sake) but of distillation (like shōchū). The majority of awamori made today uses indica rice imported from Thailand due to its ease of koji production and alcohol yield, the production of awamori made from rice grown in Okinawa has been increasing in recent years.

Awamori is typically 60–86 proof (30–43% alcohol), although export brands (including brands shipped to mainland Japan) are often 50 proof (25% alcohol). Some styles (notably hanadaki (Japanese:hanazake)) are 120 proof (60%) and are flammable.

The most popular way to drink awamori in Okinawa is with water and ice. When served in a restaurant in Okinawa, it will nearly always be accompanied by a container of ice and carafe of water. Awamori can also be drunk straight, on the rocks, and in cocktails. Traditionally, awamori was served in a kara-kara, a small earthen vessel with a small clay marble inside. The marble would make a distinctive "kara-kara" sound to let people know the vessel was empty. These vessels are still found in Okinawa, but the clay marbles are often absent.

Another name for awamori used in Okinawa is sima-jaki (Japanese: 島酒, romanized: shima-zake, lit. '"island sake"'), or shima for short.

Awamori is aged in traditional clay pots to improve its flavor and mellowness. In general, the price of awamori increases with the beverage's age.

Kōrēgusu (Okinawan: Kooreegusu) is a type of hot sauce made of chillis infused in awamori and is a popular condiment to Okinawan dishes such as suba.

In December 2024, UNESCO added knowledge and traditional techniques used for making sake, aamui and shochu to its Intangible Cultural Heritage list.

Awamori is the oldest distilled alcoholic drink in Japan, it is believed to predate sochu.

== History ==
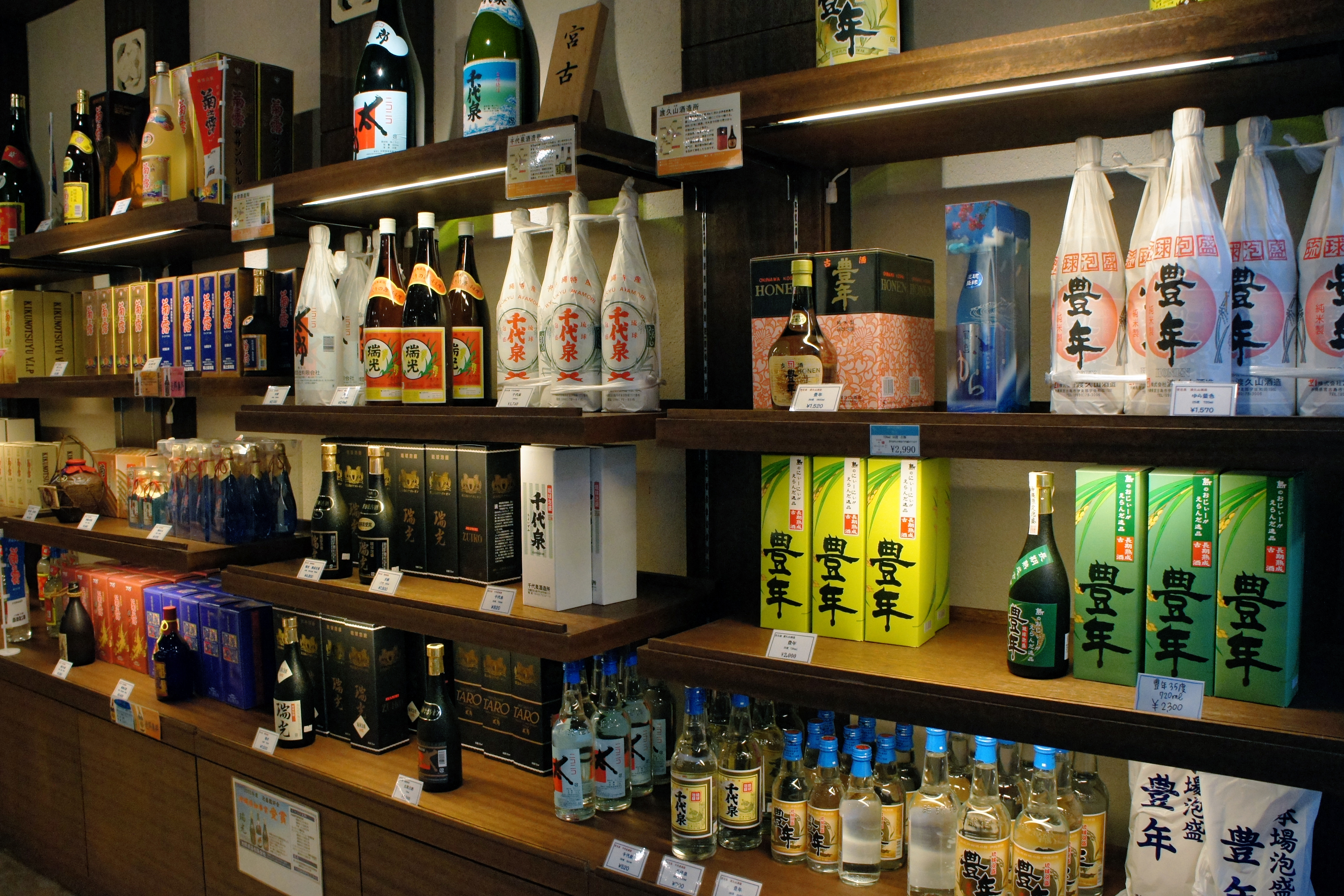
Bottled awamori displayed in a shop

Awamori owes its existence to Okinawa's trading history. It originates from the Thai drink lao khao. The technique of distilling reached Ryukyu Kingdom, today's Okinawa, from the Ayutthaya Kingdom (roughly present-day Thailand) in the 15th century, a time when Okinawa served as a major trading intermediary between Southeast Asia, China, and Japan. The Okinawans refined the distillation process, incorporating techniques from nearby countries, making it more suitable for the subtropical climate and incorporating the unique local black koji mold. From the 15th to 19th century, awamori was sent as a tribute to Okinawa's powerful neighbors, to the shogun during the Edo period, and was served to show hospitality to envoys from China. Strict control for the production and sale of awamori was implemented by the Ryukyu government, which only allowed the upper classes consumption and serving overseas dignitaries, including Commodore Matthew C. Perry.

Since Okinawa's return to Japan in 1972, awamori had been labelled as "second class shochu (焼酎乙類)," but from April 1983, awamori was allowed to be labelled as "authentic awamori (本場泡盛)." Furthermore, in June 1995, "Ryukyu" was registered as a geographical indication (GI) for distilled spirits by the National Tax Agency of Japan, and since 2004, awamori produced in Okinawa has been labeled "Ryukyu Awamori."

In 2017, facing declining sales in the home market, three of Okinawa's prominent awamori distilleries combined their efforts to introduce awamori} to overseas markets, specifically to the US and Europe. The product, branded Ryukyu 1429, made its UK debut in June 2019.

== Production ==
Although awamori is a distilled rice spirit, it differs from Japanese shochu in several ways. Awamori is made in a single fermentation of koji while shochu is usually made by two-step fermentation of koji and main ingredients such as sweet potatoes, barley and rice. Furthermore, awamori uses Thai-style, long-grained indica rice rather than the short-grained japonica usually used in shochu production. Finally, awamori exclusively uses black koji mold (Aspergillus luchuensis) indigenous to Okinawa, while Japanese shochu uses white (A. luchuensis var. kawachii), black (Aspergillus awamori), and yellow (Aspergillus oryzae) koji molds.

== Kuusu ==
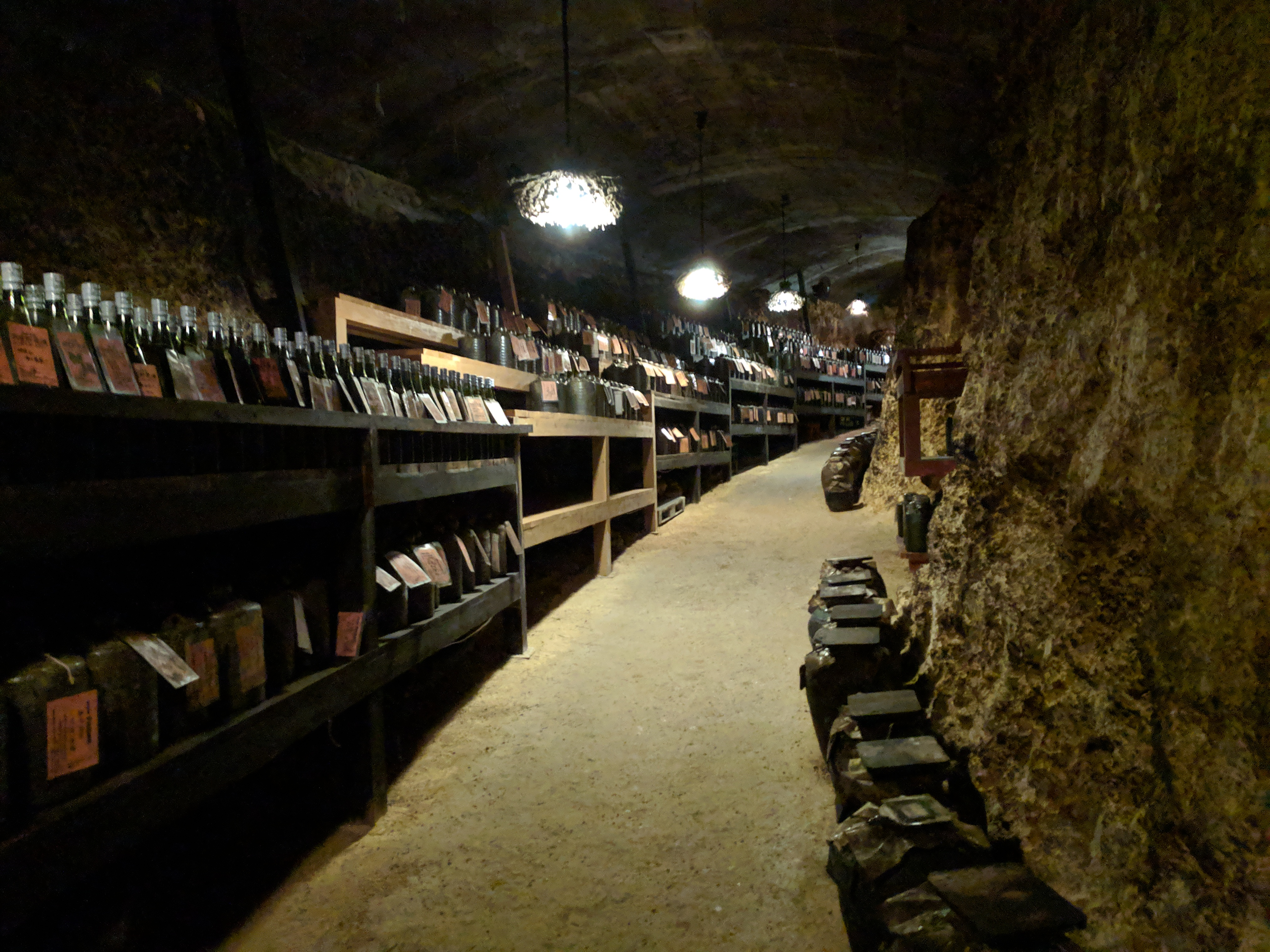
Awamori maturing in the purposely constructed cellar at Taragawa distillery, Miyako-jima, Okinawa

When aamui is aged for three years or more, it is called Okinawan: クース/古酒, romanized: Kuusu, kusu (古酒; "old liquor"). This pronunciation, which derives from Okinawan, is unique to awamori; elsewhere in Japan, the word is pronounced "koshu" and refers to aged sake. Legally, in order to earn the designation "kusu", the awamori must be aged for a minimum of three years. If a specific age is noted, then all of the contents must be of at least that age. Awamori is aged underground in constant cool temperatures in clay pots or vases. Containers of awamori can be found in the caves of Okinawa.

Before the Battle of Okinawa during World War II, 200- and even 300-year-old kusu existed, but most of the oldest kusu were lost in the battle. However, the Shikina Distillery in Shuri owns 100- and 150-year-old Kuusju which are thought to be the oldest surviving. There are ongoing attempts to once again produce 200- and 300-year-old Kuusju.

== Hanazake ==
On Yonaguni, Ryukyu Islands' westernmost island, the three distilleries of Donan, Yonaguni and Maifuna produce a variant of awamori called hanazake (Yonaguni: ハナダキ/花酒, hanadaki), lit. "flower liquor", which has an alcohol content of 60%. Originally intended for religious ceremonies, hanazake is traditionally consumed straight.

== Etymology ==
The earliest known use of the term awamori (泡盛) is in a 1671 record of a gift from king Shō Tei of the Ryukyu Kingdom to the fourth shōgun, Tokugawa Ietsuna. Awamori was sent as a gift to the shogunate prior to 1671, but it was recorded as shōchū (焼酒 or 焼酎) in earlier records.

Several explanations exist for the etymology of the word awamori. The Okinawan historian Iha Fuyū believed that the name derives from the word for millet (粟, awa), compounded with a verb-derived noun meaning "heaped amount; serving" (盛り, mori). On this theory, the word was recorded incorrectly with the first character as "bubble, foam" (泡, awa) rather than the character for millet (粟, awa). Millet was a raw material used to make awamori at the time that the word was first used.

Another hypothesis is that the name comes from a method that was used in the past for assessing the quality of distilled liquors. This method was to slowly pour the liquor from a small bowl held in one hand into an empty bowl held in the other hand about one foot below. The desired result was for a large number of small bubbles (泡, awa) to rise and swell (盛, mori) in the lower bowl as the liquor is poured into it. Longer-lasting bubbles were also seen as desirable.

== See also ==
- Habushu
- List of rice beverages
