= Japanese regional cuisine =

Japanese cuisine has a vast array of regional specialities known as kyōdo ryōri (郷土料理) in Japanese, many of them originating from dishes prepared using local ingredients and traditional recipes.

While "local" ingredients are now available nationwide, and some originally regional dishes such as okonomiyaki and Edo-style sushi have spread throughout Japan and are no longer considered as such, many regional specialities survive to this day, with some new ones still being created.

Regionality is also apparent in many dishes which are served throughout Japan such as ozōni soup. For example, the dashi-based broth for serving udon noodles is heavy on dark soy sauce, similar to soba broth, in eastern Japan, while in western Japan the broth relies more on the complex dashi-flavouring, with a hint of light soy sauce.

== Historical origins ==
Broadly speaking, the historical origins of Japanese regional specialities can be categorized into four types:

- Traditional – Food originating from local ingredients before the days of refrigeration
- Late 19th and early 20th centuries – The influx of foreign culture in the wake of the 1886 Meiji Restoration and the end of national seclusion led to waves of new dishes being invented throughout Japan using new ingredients and cooking methods.
- In the aftermath of the Second World War – Food shortages led to new dishes being devised from existing ingredients, many by returning soldiers bringing back recipes from abroad.
- Modern – Modern chefs inventing new dishes which become popular locally, as well as dishes artificially proclaimed to be regional specialties by local businesses and tourist boards.

== List of regional specialities ==
=== Hokkaido ===
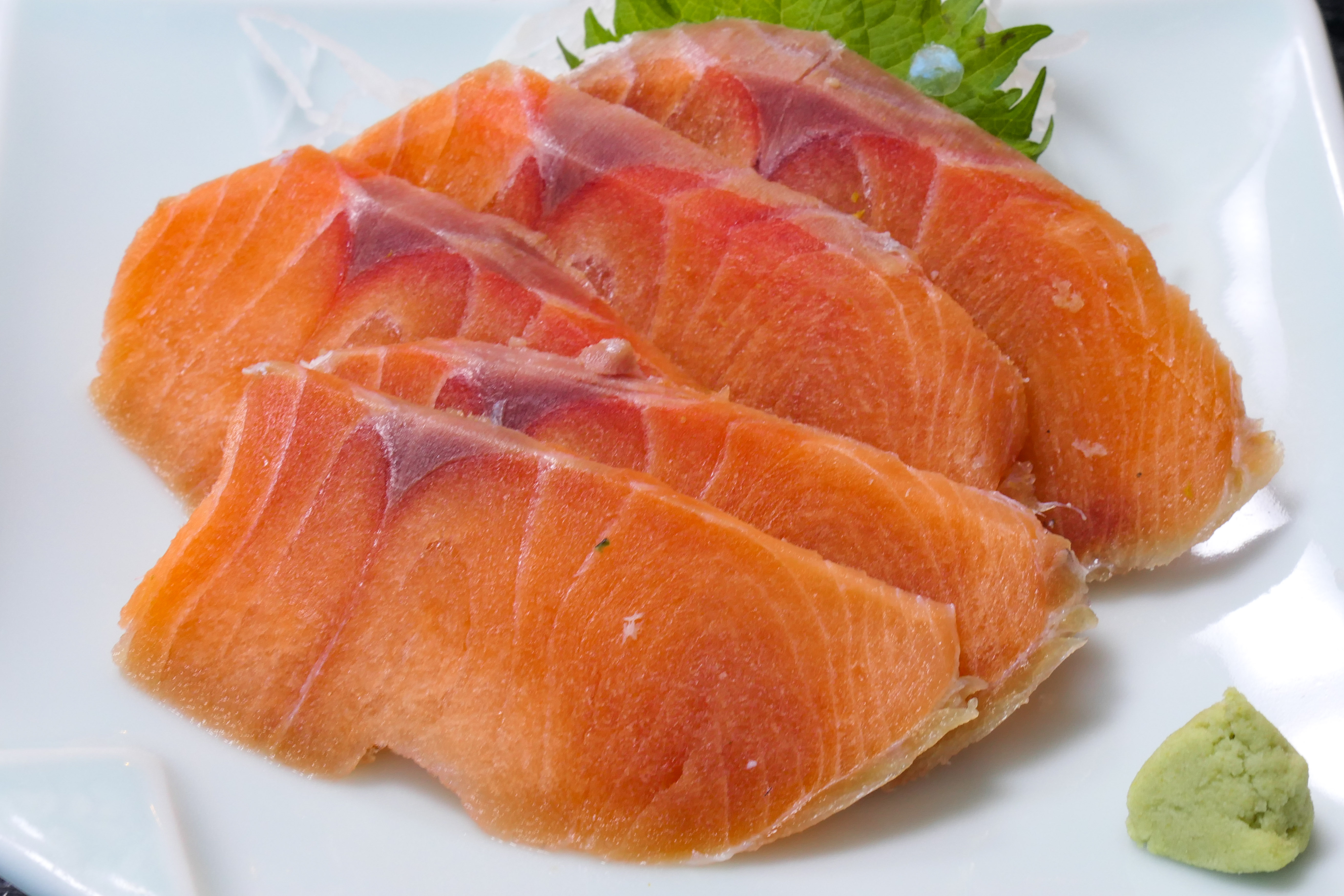
Salmon ruibe in Hokkaido

- Jingisukan – Lamb and vegetables, barbecued, often at the table
- Ishikari-nabe – A nabemono dish of salmon pieces stewed with vegetables in a miso-based broth
- Ruibe – An Ainu speciality. Thinly sliced raw, frozen salmon (traditionally frozen naturally outside), eaten like sashimi
- Sanpei-jiru – A winter miso soup made with salmon and vegetables such as daikon, carrot, potato, and onions
- Chanchan-yaki – peciality of fishing villages. Miso-grilled salmon with bean sprouts and other vegetables
- Hokkaido ramen – Many cities in Hokkaido have their own versions of ramen
- Ika sōmen – Squid sliced into very thin noodle-like strips and eaten with a dipping sauce, like sōmen (Hakodate)

=== Tōhoku region ===
- Ichigo-ni – A clear soup of thinly sliced sea urchin roe and abalone. (Pacific coast of Aomori Prefecture)
- Ika menchi – Fried minced vegetables, squid, and floor patties, often served with sauce (Aomori Prefecture)
- Senbei-jiru – A soy-based soup containing baked rice cake and vegetables (Hachinohe)
- Kiritanpo – Pounded rice cakes wrapped around a skewer and grilled. Eaten with miso or stewed with chicken and vegetables as a nabemono (Akita Prefecture)
- Jappa-jiru (or zappa-jiru) – Fish gut and vegetable soup, usually cod or salmon. (Aomori and Akita Prefectures)
- The three great noodles of Morioka, in Iwate Prefecture:
  - Wanko soba – Soba noodles served in tiny bowls which are re-filled repeatedly
  - Morioka reimen – A variation of naengmyeon, a Korean cold noodle soup, introduced by Korean immigrants
  - Jajamen – A Japanese variant of the Chinese zhajiangmian
- Imoni – Taro and meat soup eaten in late summer and early autumn (Yamagata Prefecture and elsewhere in Tōhoku)
- Dondon-yaki – Okonomiyaki wrapped around a wooden stick to take away (Yamagata City) or folded in two (Sendai)
- Gyūtan – Beef tongue. Usually grilled but can be served medium or even sashimi style, raw (Sendai)
- Harako-meshi – Rice cooked in a salmon and soy stock and served topped with ikura

=== Chūbu and Kanto regions ===
- Inago no tsukudani – Inago (a type of grasshopper) stewed in sweetened soy (Rural communities in inland Yamagata, Nagano and Gunma Prefectures)
- Hōtō – Udon noodles stewed in a miso-based soup with vegetables such as pumpkin or potatoes, mushrooms and sometimes meat. This is usually served in a cast-iron pot.
- Monja-yaki – A savoury pancake similar to okonomiyaki but much runnier and eaten directly off the grill using a metal spatula, from working-class districts of Tokyo. A nostalgic food item making a recent comeback.
- Yanagawa nabe and dojō nabe – A nabemono dish of loach cooked in a pot. Yanagawa nabe also contains sliced burdock root and egg (working class districts of Tokyo)
- Sushi – What is known as "sushi" worldwide is a type of sushi known in Japan as edo-mae-zushi (Edo Bay sushi) and originates from 1820s Edo (Tokyo)
- Masuzushi – Trout steamed in wrapped bamboo leaves and served on a circular bed of rice six inches in diameter (Toyama Prefecture)
- Jibu-ni – Duck or chicken pieces coated in starch and stewed with wheat gluten, mushrooms and vegetables in a soy-dashi broth (Kanazawa)
- Sauce katsudon – Katsudon with Worcestershire sauce (Komagane, Nagano and Fukui Prefecture)
- Miso nikomi udon – Udon stewed in broth flavoured with hatcho-miso (Nagoya and surrounding areas)
- Misokatsu – Tonkatsu (breaded pork cutlet) with a miso based sauce (Nagoya and surrounding areas)
- Kishimen – A type of flat udon (Nagoya)
- Hamaguri cuisine – Various dishes made from oriental clams in Kiso Three Rivers estuary (Kuwana)
- Tekone-zushi – A type of sushi where slices of raw tuna and the like are marinaded in a soy sauce based marinade and then laid out over vinegared rice and sprinkled with shredded nori, etc. (southern Shima Peninsula in Mie Prefecture)

=== Kansai and Chūgoku regions ===
- Yudofu – Tofu simmered in hot water with kombu and eaten with various dipping sauces (Kyoto)
- Osaka zushi – Sushi pressed quadrangle sharp and also called Hako zushi ("box sushi") (Osaka)
  - Battera zushi - A type of box sushi using mackerel and vinegared kelp. Named battera taken from the Portuguese bateria or small boat.
- Funa zushi – Ancient style sushi in Shiga Prefecture
- Kitsune udon – Hot udon with sweet aburaage which is popular in Osaka
- Okonomiyaki – Savory pancakes with cabbage, meat or seafood, flavored with Japanese worcestershire sauce and mayonnaise.
  - Osaka style – Ingredients are mixed into the batter before grilling. Has now spread nationwide
  - Hiroshima style – Made out of layers of batter, cabbage, toppings, yakisoba and fried egg
- Horumon yaki-udon – Yakiudon with the pluck in Tsuyama, Okayama
- Takoyaki – Balls of grilled, savory batter with pieces of octopus inside. Is now popular throughout Japan (Osaka)
- Akashiyaki – Prototype of takoyaki balls in Akashi, Hyōgo
- Kibi dango – Dango from the Kibi region in Okayama Prefecture
- Demi-Katsu – A katsudon specialty that uses a demiglace sauce (Okayama)
- Izumo soba – A type of soba famous in the Izumo area (Shimane Prefecture)
- Dote-nabe – A nabemono dish of oysters, tofu and vegetables stewed in a miso-based broth (Hiroshima Prefecture)
- Fugu – Famous in Shimonoseki, Yamaguchi Prefecture. Fugu cuisine is also popular in Osaka.
- Obanzai – A style of cooking rather than a dish in Kyoto

=== Shikoku ===
- Katsuo no tataki – Sliced, seared skipjack tuna, or finely chopped skipjack mixed with chopped spring onion and seasoned with rice vinegar (Kōchi Prefecture)
- Sanuki udon – Udon is one of the most popular foods in the Sanuki Province, today Kagawa Prefecture, and udon produced here is famous nationwide
- Sawachi ryori – Traditionally sashimi, sushi but more recently other foods, presented on a huge plate called "sawachi" (Kōchi)
- Shoyumame – Parched broad beans marinaded overnight in a mixture of soy sauce, sugar, mirin and sake (Kagawa Prefecture)
- Sudachi – A tiny lime-like citrus, which is mixed, grated and added to fish dishes of the Tokushima area to give any dish the distinctive summertime in Tokushima taste

=== Kyūshū ===
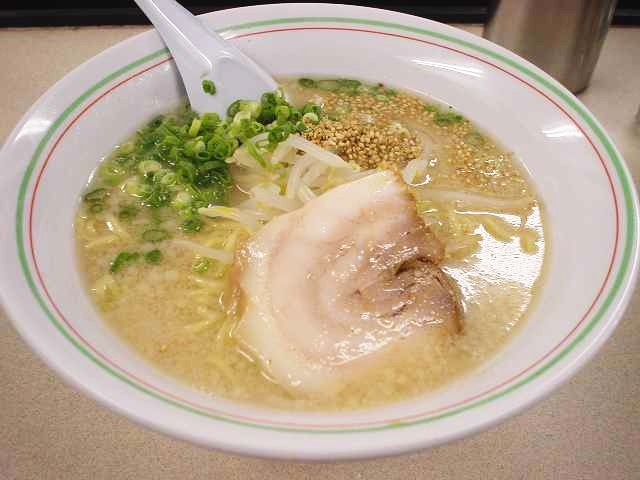
Hakata ramen

- Mizutaki – A nabemono dish of chicken and vegetables cooked in broth and served with a ponzu dipping sauce (Fukuoka)
- Hakata ramen – Noodles served in a tonkotsu (pork bone stock) soup with unique toppings such as beni shōga (pickled ginger), sesame seeds and picked greens. Yatai stalls in Hakata and Tenjin are well-known. Many restaurants operate a system known as kaedama (替え玉), where customers who have finished eating can ask for cheap additional bundles of noodles to be put in their remaining soup. The noodles are typically thin and straight. Now popular throughout Japan.
- Motsunabe – A nabemono dish of beef or pork offal (Fukuoka)
- Mentaiko – Spicy fish eggs (Fukuoka)
- Champon – A ramen-like dish of noodles, seafood and vegetables cooked in the same pot (Nagasaki)
- Castella – A sweet, rectangular sponge cake, introduced to Nagasaki by the Portuguese in the 16th century, now popular throughout Japan (Nagasaki)
- Chicken nanban – Fried battered chicken dipped in a vinegary sauce and served with tartar sauce (Miyazaki Prefecture)
- Dango-jiru – A miso or a soy sauce-based soup containing wheat noodles as well as vegetables, shimeji mushrooms and pork
- Kakuni – Pork belly, stewed in sweetened soy-based broth until very soft (Nagasaki and Kagoshima)
- Keihan – Chicken soup with rice (Amami Islands)
- Tonkotsu – Kagoshima pork ribs simmered in shochu, miso, and black sugar for over five hours. Not to be confused with Tonkotsu ramen.
- Tonkotsu ramen – Pork belly and ribs, stewed for several hours alongside konnyaku and daikon in a broth containing miso, brown sugar and shōchū. A popular izakaya and ekiben item in the Kagoshima region.
- Sake-zushi – A type of sushi which uses rice flavored with sake instead of the usual rice vinegar. Served in a tub topped with shrimp, sea bream, octopus, shiitake mushrooms, bamboo shoots and shredded omelette.
- Toriten – A tempura chicken that can be dipped in a soy sauce-based sauce (Ōita Prefecture)

=== Okinawa ===
- Chanpurū – Okinawan stir fry.
  - Gōyā chanpurū – Bitter melon stir fried with other vegetables, tofu, and either Spam, bacon, thinly sliced pork belly, or canned tuna.
  - Tōfu chanpurū – Firm Okinawan tofu stir-fried with vegetables and Spam, bacon, thinly sliced pork belly, or canned tuna.
  - Naaberaa chanpurū – Chanpurū made with luffa.
- Rafute – Stewed pork belly.
- Soki – Stewed pork ribs.
- Okinawa soba – A noodle soup vaguely resembling udon, often topped with soki ("soki-soba").
- Naabeeraa nbushi – Miso-flavored luffa stir-fry.
- Taco rice (tako-raisu) – Invented in the 1960s. Taco meat served on a bed of rice and lettuce, often served together with tomato, cucumber, cheese and topped off with salsa

=== Various ===
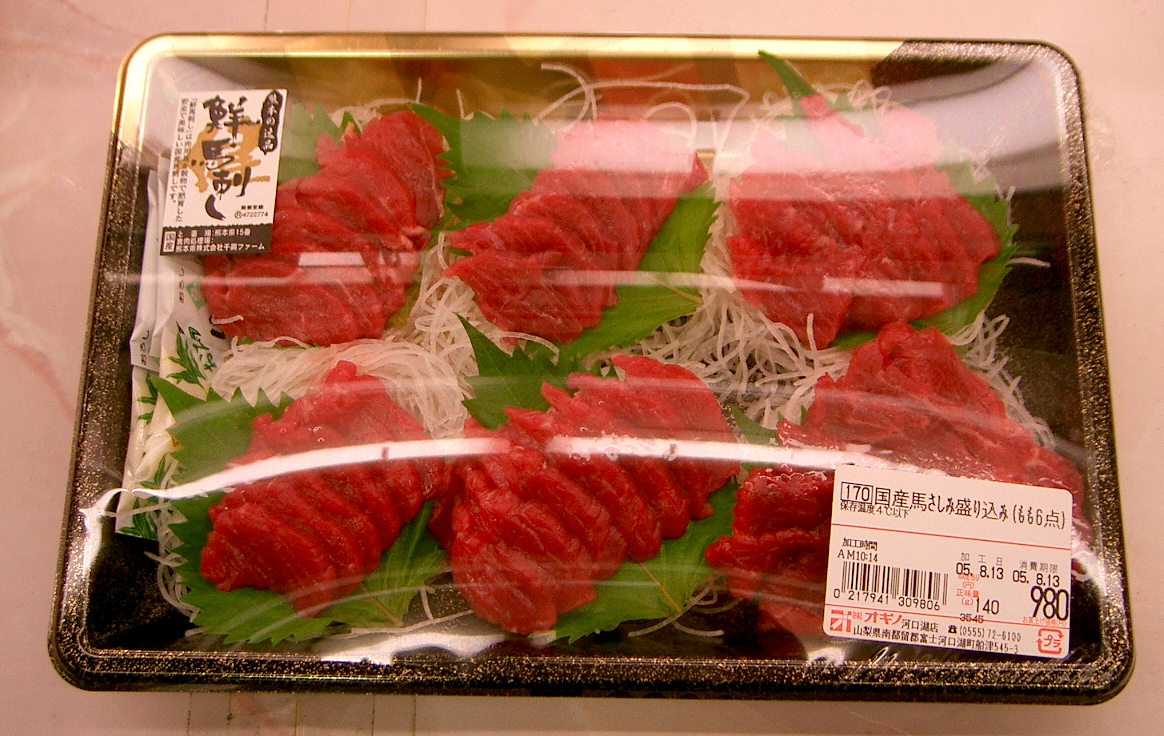
Basashi for sale in supermarket in Nagano

- Fugu cuisine – Various dishes made from fugu, such as sashimi and nabemono (Yamaguchi Prefecture, northern Kyūshū and Osaka)
- Botan nabe – A wild boar nabemono dish (Various locales, but especially the Tanzawa region in Kanagawa Prefecture and Tanba region in Kansai)
- Basashi – Horse meat sashimi (Kumamoto area, Matsumoto area and rural Tōhoku)

== See also ==
- Meibutsu – literally "famous things"; a popular concept in Japan referring to the fame of certain locales for given foods or products.
