= List of Digimon Universe: App Monsters episodes =

Digimon Universe: App Monsters
- No. of episodes: 52

Release
- Original network: TX Network
- Original release: October 1, 2016 – September 30, 2017

Season chronology
- ← Previous; Digimon Fusion (season 3) Next → Digimon Adventure (2020 series)

Digimon Universe: App Monsters is a Japanese anime and seventh incarnation of the Digimon franchise. The anime adaptation of the series began airing on all TXN stations in Japan on October 1, 2016, replacing Time Travel Girl on its original timeslot. The series opening theme from episodes 1 to 25 is "DiVE" by Amatsuki and from episodes 26 to 52, "Gatchen!" by SymaG. The ending theme from episodes 1 to 13 is "Aoi Honoo Syndrome" (青い炎シンドローム, Aoi honō shindorōmu; "Blue Flame Syndrome") by Riho Iida, from episodes 14 to 25, "Ai" (アイ; "Eye") by Ami Wajima, from episodes 26 to 38, "Little Pi" by Ange☆Reve and from episodes 39 to 52, "Perfect World" (パーフェクトワールド) by Traffic Light.

== Episode list ==
No.	Title	Original release date
1	"The Search Result is Haru Shinkai! Gatchmon Appears!"; Transliteration: "Kensaku Kekka wa Shinkai Haru! Gacchimon Arawaru!" (Japanese: 検索結果は新海ハル！ガッチモンあらわる！)	October 1, 2016
Haru Shinkai always thought that he never had what it takes to be a hero, until a fated meeting with Gatchmon gives him the choice to become one. After he chooses to become a hero, a rogue Appmon named Messemon messes up the messages on everyone's phone.
2	"The Mysterious Guide! I am Navimon!"; Transliteration: "Ayashiki Michisaki An'nainin! Sessha Nabimon de gozaru!" (Japanese: あやしき道先案内人！拙者ナビモンでござる！)	October 8, 2016
Haru's friends get themselves in trouble when their search apps go hawyire, and realizing that an Appmon named Navimon is the culprit, he and Gatchmon confront it.
3	"The Role of Culture in Nature's Garb!? Roleplaymon's School Dungeon!"; Transliteration: "Sodateta Kyara ga Supponpon!? Rōpuremon no Gakkō Danjon!" (Japanese: 育てたキャラがスッポンポン！？ロープレモンの学校ダンジョン！)	October 15, 2016
After gaining a new ally that can fuse with Gatchmon into the more powerful DoGatchmon and driving away Cameramon, an agent of the evil artificial intelligence "Leviathan", Haru pursues an Appmon named Roleplaymon that intends to transform the city's systems into a Role Playing Game.
4	"Take Your Dressing! Cameramon's Halloween Scandal!"; Transliteration: "Kasō no Kimi o ui tadakimasu! Kyameramon no Harowin Sukyandaru!" (Japanese: 仮装のキミをうぃただきます！キャメラモンのハロウィンスキャンダル！)	October 22, 2016
It's Halloween, and Gatchmon leaves Haru's side to enjoy the festivities. However, Cameramon takes the opportunity to ambush Haru in order to steal his AppliDrive.
5	"An Explosive Punch to Your Heart! Eri is the Appmon Idol!"; Transliteration: "Anata no Hāto ni Dokkan Panchi! Eri wa Apumon Aidoru!" (Japanese: あなたのハートにドッカンパンチ！エリはアプモンアイドル！)	October 29, 2016
Haru discovers that the idol Eri Karan is an Appli Driver like him and decides to meet her. In the occasion, the two join forces against a rogue Appmon named Dressmon that is messing up with people's clothes.
6	"The Best Gourmet Report! Gourmet Appli, Perorimon!"; Transliteration: "Saikō no Gurume Repōto! Gurume Apuri・Perorimon!" (Japanese: 最高のグルメレポート！グルメアプリ・ペロリモン！)	November 5, 2016
Eri meets the gourmet Appmon, Perorimon, and attempts to appease him in order to bolster her career, but the plan backfires and Perorimon flees. Soon after, data from sites everywhere starts going missing, and both Eri and Haru start searching for Perorimon, wondering if he is involved, until they find the real culprit.
7	"The third Appli Drive! Torajirou is the Apptuber!"; Transliteration: "Mitsume no Apuri Doraivu! Torajirō wa Apu Chūbā!" (Japanese: 3つ目のアプリドライヴ！虎次郎はアプチューバー！)	November 12, 2016
Haru meets Torajirou Asuka, a famous Apptuber who also happens to be an Appli Driver like him and Eri. Aside from his energetic demeanor, Torajirou also hides a strict side that is revealed when he and Haru confront an Appmon named Watchmon that is making watches around the world out of sync.
8	"The Super Suck Big Pinch!? Astra's Great "Interesting Animation" Operation!"; Transliteration: "Dai Pinchi de Chō Norenē!? Asutora no Omoshiro Dōga Daisakusen!" (Japanese: 大ピンチで超ノレねえ！？アストラのおもしろ動画大作戦！)	November 19, 2016
Haru introduces Astra and Eri, but they soon start bickering due to their incompatible egos. Soon after, Astra becomes distressed upon learning of another Apptuber becoming far more famous than him, and his videos plummeting in popularity suddenly, unaware that an infected Appmon named Dogamon is involved.
9	"Aim at the Rated Number One! Appmon Championship in Cyber Arena!"; Transliteration: "Mezase Kakuzuke Nanbāwan! Apumon Senshuken In Saibā Arīna!" (Japanese: めざせ格付けナンバーワン！アプモン選手権 イン サイバーアリーナ！)	November 26, 2016
Haru, Astra and Eri are invited by their Appmon to participate in a competition between them, but the climax of the festivities are interrupted when a hostile Appmon called Hackmon arrives to challenge them.
10	"The Appmon's Long-Awaited! The Legend Seven Code Meeting!"; Transliteration: "Apumon tachi no Akogare! Densetsu no Sebun Kōdo Kai!" (Japanese: アプモンたちのあこがれ！伝説のセブンコード会！)	December 3, 2016
Haru and the others attend a meeting intending to meet the other Seven Code Appmon, but instead they are lured into an ambush by Hackmon and his Appli Driver Rei Katsura, who challenge them for a fight.
11	"Dive into the Net Ocean! Chasing to the Super Hacker, Rei!"; Transliteration: "Netto no Umi ni Daibu seyo! Sūpā Hakkā Rei o Oe!" (Japanese: ネットの海にダイブせよ！スーパーハッカー レイを追え！)	December 10, 2016
Chasing after Rei in order to rescue the Seven Code Appmon he stole from them, Haru and his friends come across Sakusimon, another of Leviathan's agents, but are rescued by Rei, and learn the reason why he is gathering the Seven Codes for himself.
12	"Defeating Sakusimon with Super Applink!"; Transliteration: "Sakushimon Chō Apurinku de Uchiyabure!" (Japanese: サクシモン 超アプリンクで 打ち破れ！)	December 17, 2016
Once learning that Rei just wants to rescue his younger brother Hajime Katsura, who was kidnapped by Leviathan, Haru offers his help. However, Rei refuses and decides to attack Haru and the others instead, when Sakusimon returns and attacks him, giving an opportunity to them to escape. Haru, on the other hand, refuses to abandon Rei, and the group decides to confront the enemy together.
13	"The Christmas Disappeared!? The Calendar Thief Calendarmon!"; Transliteration: "Kurisumasu ga Kiechatta!? Koyomi Dorobō Karendamon!" (Japanese: クリスマスが消えちゃった！？暦泥棒カレンダモン！)	December 24, 2016
Christmas is at hand but both December 24th and 25th are erased from the world's digital calendars, threatening to ruin the festivities. While pursuing the Appmon named Calendarmon responsible, Haru and Gatchmon ends up revealing their secret to Haru's friend Ai Kashiki, who becomes their ally.
14	"The City Becomes Puzzle Game!? Puzzlemon Runaway!"; Transliteration: "Machijū ga Pazuru Gēmu!? Pazurumon Dai Bōsō!" (Japanese: 街中がパズルゲーム！？パズルモン大暴走！)	January 7, 2017
By the interference of another rogue Appmon named Puzzlemon, the city is in turmoil because all electronic doors and vehicles are sealed by puzzle-related locks, and Haru and his friends run after it to bring things back to normal and defeat Puzzlemon.
15	"See Through the Future!? Mysterious Fortune Teller, Tellermon"; Transliteration: "Mirai wa Zenbu Mieteiru!? Shinpi no Uranai・Terāmon" (Japanese: 未来は全部見えている！？神秘の占い・テラーモン)	January 14, 2017
In order to find out the location of the next seven code appmon, Haru and co asked a fortune teller app appmon: Tellermon to perform fortune telling. However, Tellermon is infected by L virus, and while Eri and Astra run after her, Haru and Rei confront Mienumon, another of Leviathan's envoys.
16	"The Message that Transcends Time – The Truth About the AppliDrive"; Transliteration: ""Toki" o Koeta Messēji – Apuri Doraivu no Shinjitsu" (Japanese: 『トキ』を超えたメッセージ アプリドライヴの真実)	January 21, 2017
Haru learns that the mysterious voice calling to him from his AppliDrive is the same as his grandfather's. By investigating further about him, the gang encounters the time Appmon, Timemon, who reveals to them the secret behind Leviathan and the one who gave them their AppliDrives.
17	"Eri is Multiplying by Copy-paste?! Reclaim, the Stage of Dreams!"; Transliteration: "Eri ga Kopipe de Daizōshoku!? Torimodose, Yume no Sutēji!" (Japanese: エリがコピペで大増殖！？とりもどせ、夢のステージ！)	January 28, 2017
Mienumon sends the Copy and Paste Appmon, Copypamon to cause a ruckus and torment Eri just when she is about to launch her first single.
18	"Haru and Yujin's Bond – Stop! Rampaging Resshamon!"; Transliteration: "Haru to Yūjin no Kizuna – Tomero! Bōsō Resshamon!" (Japanese: ハルと勇仁の絆 止めろ！暴走レッシャモン！)	February 4, 2017
Haru considers sharing his secret with his best friend Yujin Ozora, just like he did with Ai. However, when an infected Appmon named Resshamon hijacks a monorail with Yujin and Eri on board, Haru and Astra run against time to prevent a tragedy and stop Resshamon.
19	"The Net Ocean in a Big Pinch! The Time is Here, Ultimate AppFusion!!"; Transliteration: "Netto no Umi ga Dai Pinchi! "Toki" wa Ki ta, Kiwami Apu Gattai!!" (Japanese: ネットの海が大ピンチ！『トキ』は来た、極アプ合体！！)	February 11, 2017
Mienumon invades the servers of the software company Waffle Inc. with an army of Virusmon just as they are to launch the new version of their Operational System to infect it. Once learning the situation from Rei, Haru and co. rush there to stop her plans, but the odds against them are overwhelming, until Timemon, witnessing the strength of the bond between Haru and Gatchmon, decides to join their side, giving Gatchmon the power to Applink to the ultimate level, Globemon.
20	"Goodbye Astra!? Dreamon's Nightmare!"; Transliteration: "Sayonara Asutora!? Dorīmon no Akumu!" (Japanese: さよならアストラ！？ドリーモンの悪夢！)	February 18, 2017
Torajiro's father decides to send him for a two year training trip, but leaves the final decision to him. Divided between his duty with his family and his desire to keep making videos on Apptube, Torajiro learns that his father's life may be in danger when he is approached by the dream Appmon, Dreamon who intends to lend him the power to upgrade Musimon's power to the next level to fight an infected Medicmon.
21	"The Way to the Top Idol! Coachmon's Intensive Training!"; Transliteration: "Toppu Aidoru e no Michi! Kōchimon no Mō Tokkun!" (Japanese: トップアイドルへの道！コーチモンの猛特訓！)	February 25, 2017
Mienumon decides to send Coachmon in another ploy to torment Eri. However, moved by Eri true desire to improve herself, no matter what harsh training he imposes, Coachmon reforms and helps Dokamon to reach the ultimate level and battle Weatherdramon, who is infected with the L-Virus..
22	"Lend me Your Power – Rei and Hackmon, Encounter in that Day"; Transliteration: "Omae no Chikara o Ore ni Kase – Rei to Hakkumon, Ano Hi no Deai" (Japanese: お前の力を俺に貸せ レイとハックモン、あの日の出会い)	March 4, 2017
As Haru and his friends chase after Mienumon, who stole the seventh and final Seven Code Appmon Chip, Rei and Hackmon set to face Dezipmon, an Appmon they encountered when they first met, and the key for them to reach the Ultimate level.
23	"Take Back the Seven Code Appmon! Showdown Ultimate vs Ultimate!"; Transliteration: "Torimodose Sebun Kōdo Apumon! Taiketsu Kiwami tai Kiwami!" (Japanese: とりもどせセブンコードアプモン！対決 極VS極！)	March 11, 2017
Haru and co. catch up to Mienumon before she manages to escape to the deep web with the seventh Seven Code Chip. However, she Applinks with Sakusimon into her Ultimate form, Warudamon and takes the offensive against them, until Rei arrives to help and the four AppliDrivers power up their Appmon to the Ultimate level as well to fight back.
24	"Super Giant Cometmon Invasion!? Open the Door, Dantemon!"; Transliteration: "Chō Kyodai Komettomon Shūrai!? Tobira o Hirake, Dantemon!" (Japanese: 超巨大コメットモン襲来！？扉をひらけ、ダンテモン！)	March 18, 2017
At last the Seven Code Appmon are gathered. However, the massive Appmon Cometmon appears to strike down at the Applidrivers, until Dantemon emerges from the Seven Code pad to defend them and open the door to the deep web, where Leviathan resides.
25	"Infiltrating to the Deep Web at last! The Mysterious Cyber Kowloon!"; Transliteration: "Tsuini Sennyū Dīpu Webu! Nazo no Saibā Kūron!" (Japanese: ついに潜入ディープウェブ！謎のサイバー九龍！)	March 25, 2017
While looking for Leviathan's whereabouts, Haru and his friends end up meeting the drawing Appmon Drawmon, who leads them to a trap. Meanwhile, Rei obtain more info about what happened with his brother and has a shocking revelation.
26	"I am the Protagonist!? Encounter with Gatchmon"; Transliteration: "Boku ga Shujinkō!? Gacchimon to no Deai" (Japanese: ボクが主人公！？ガッチモンとの出会い)	April 1, 2017
A summary of the events in the series so far.
27	"The Fifth AppliDriver!"; Transliteration: "Goninme no Apuri Doraivā!" (Japanese: 五人目のアプリドライヴァー！)	April 8, 2017
Haru and co. confront a rogue Appmon named Tubumon that spreads false scandals and dark secrets on the net, but this time, the enemy is assisted by Satellamon, who leaves them in a pinch, until Yujin appears to help, revealing that he is also an AppliDriver.
28	"The AppliDrive DUO! Offmon Appears"; Transliteration: "Apuri Doraivu Dyuo! Ofumon Arawaru" (Japanese: アプリドライヴDUO！オフモンあらわる)	April 15, 2017
Yujin and his Appmon Offmon join the team, but when Offmon runs in fear of the others, they search after him, coming across another enemy named Musclemon in the way.
29	"Buddies no More!? Gatchmon's Run away from home" Transliteration: "Badi Kaishō!? Gacchimon no Iede" (Japanese: バディ解消！？ガッチモンの家出)	April 22, 2017
Fed up with the others doting Offmon, Gatchmon runs away from home, and both Dokamon and Musimon decide to follow him. However, they meet a boy who is lost after also running away and the trio works together to help him find his way back to his family.
30	"Dokamon's Love!? Gourmet Appli, Marypero Invasion!"; Transliteration: "Dokamon no Koi!? Gurume Apuri・Maripero Shūrai!" (Japanese: ドカモンの恋！？グルメアプリ・マリペロ襲来！)	April 29, 2017
MariPerorimon, the Appmon of a Gourmet App specialized on Mega Servings, look for Eri's help to increase her reviewing skills, but with Eri too busy with work, Dokamon offers himself to train her instead.
31	"The Traveling Companion!? Tripmon's Terrible Trip"; Transliteration: "Tabi wa Michizure!? Torippumon no Kyōfu Torippu" (Japanese: 旅は道連れ！？トリップモンの恐怖トリップ)	May 6, 2017
Eri earns a trip to a resort hotel and invites Haru and the others for it. However, they are misdirected by Tripmon, an Appmon serving under Satellamon, who is eager to take back at Offmon for stopping him in their previous encounter.
32	"Everyone to Take you Out! The Self-Withdrawal Offmon!"; Transliteration: "Minna de Tsuredase! Hikikomori no Ofumon!" (Japanese: みんなで連れ出せ！引きこもりのオフモン！)	May 13, 2017
After losing control and injuring Yujin in the last fight, Offmon decides to leave his side, but Satellamon appears to challenge Offmon again and Yujin convinces him to trust their bond and fight the enemy together with Haru and Globemon's help.
33	"The Senior High School Student CEO! Knight Unryūji Appears!"; Transliteration: "Kōkōsei CEO! Unryūji Naito Arawaru!" (Japanese: 高校生CEO！雲龍寺ナイトあらわる！)	May 20, 2017
Rei steals some critical data while looking for Hajime, while the CEO of L Corporation is replaced by Knight Unryūji, a young boy working for Leviathan.
34	"Thank you Future! Welcome to the City of Artificial Intelligence!"; Transliteration: "Sankyū Mirai! Jinkōchinō no Machi e Yōkoso!" (Japanese: サンキュー未来！人工知能の街へようこそ！)	May 27, 2017
Haru, Eri, Torajiro and Yujin are invited to visit L Town, a city fully designed and operated by L Corp, where they encounter a rouge Appmon named Batterimon and Cloud, a human who warns them to stop meddling with Leviathan's plans.
35	"Aim to be the God 9! The General Election of AppliYama 470!"; Transliteration: "Mezase Kyūnin Goddo! Apuri Yama 470 Sōsenkyo!" (Japanese: めざせ9人ゴッド！アプリ山470総選挙！)	June 3, 2017
AppliYama 470's general election is underway. Eri works hard to secure a position among the most voted idols, but in the last minute, a rogue Appmon named Calcumon out of devotion for her decides to mess up with the results, forcing her and her friends to intervene.
36	"The Conclusion of General Election! The Hand of Devil Approaching to Eri!"; Transliteration: "Sōsenkyo Kecchaku! Eri ni Semaru Manote!" (Japanese: 総選挙決着！エリに迫る魔の手！)	June 10, 2017
The time has come for the general election to end. As Eri and her friends are eagerly waiting for the results, Rei and Hackmon break into one of L Corp's buildings and discover its connection with Leviathan.
37	"Invasion! The Ultimate Appmons, Ultimate 4!"; Transliteration: "Shūrai! Kiwami Apumon・Arutimetto 4!" (Japanese: 襲来！極アプモン・アルティメット4！)	June 17, 2017
Haru, Eri, Torajirou and Rei are attacked by the Ultimate 4, a team of powerful Appmon under Leviathan's that easily destroy both their buddies and AppliDrives. Just as they are about to be killed as well, Yujin and Shutmon appear and face the enemies by themselves to help them escape.
38	"Take Back the Gatchmon! Grandpa Den'emon's Trial!"; Transliteration: "Gacchimon o Torimodose! Den'emon Jīchan no Shiren!" (Japanese: ガッチモンを取り戻せ！電衛門じいちゃんの試練！)	June 24, 2017
Haru is contacted by his grandfather, and guided by his instructions, he and the others reunite with their Appmons, who do not remember them at all, and are sent to a journey to restore their buddies' memories. In the occasion, they not only reconnect with Gatchmon and the others, but obtain each one their own AppliDrive DUO.
39	"The New Power! The AppliDrive DUO!"; Transliteration: "Aratana Chikara! Apuri Doraivu Dyuo!" (Japanese: 新たな力！アプリドライヴDUO！)	July 1, 2017
Haru and the others set to rescue Yujin and Offmon from the Ultimate 4, but are informed that they only have 60 minutes left before the two are killed. To proceed further, they must also confront some of their fallen enemies who were revived to fight them again.
40	"Ultimate 4 Returns! Cloud's Challenge Letter!"; Transliteration: "Arutimetto 4 Futatabi! Kuraudo no Chōsenjō!" (Japanese: アルティメット4再び！クラウドの挑戦状！)	July 8, 2017
The AppliDrivers run against time to rescue Yujin and Offmon. Haru's friends stay behind to face the other members of the Ultimate 4, opening the way for him and Gatchmon to rush after their leader, Charismon.
41	"The Ultimate Fierce Fighting! Globemon vs Charismon!"; Transliteration: "Kyokugen no Gekitō! Gurōbumon tai Karisumon!" (Japanese: 極限の激闘！グローブモンVSカリスモン！)	July 15, 2017
Time is running out, but Haru still must pass by Charismon to rescue Yujin and Offmon. Overpowered by the enemy, all hope seems lost until Haru makes a risky move to boost out his buddy's power.
42	"Rei's Determination! The Great "Search for Hajime" Operation!"; Transliteration: "Rei no Ketsui! Hajime Sōsaku Daisakusen!" (Japanese: レイの決意！はじめ捜索大作戦！)	July 22, 2017
Haru and co. join forces to help Rei storm the headquarters of L Corp in search for his brother, Hajime. But it not takes long for them to be discovered and they must fight their way against an army of Sleepmon to rescue him.
43	"Wake Up, Sleepmon! The Appmon Championship Reopening!!"; Transliteration: "Mezamero, Surīpumon! Apumon Senshuken Futatabi!!" (Japanese: 目覚めろ、スリープモン！アプモン選手権再び！！)	July 29, 2017
Hajime was transformed into the Appmon Sleepmon and is on a deep sleep, thus all the Appmon attempt to wake him up with no success, until he finally awakens thanks to Rei's efforts and reveals the reason why he was kidnapped by Leviathan.
44	"Chasing to the Fugitive, Bootmon!"; Transliteration: "Tōbōsha・Būtomon o Oe!" (Japanese: 逃亡者・ブートモンを追え！)	August 5, 2017
To stop Leviathan from taking over the world, the AppliDrivers must find Hajime's creation, the Appmon Bootmon before he is captured by the enemy, but during their search for him, another troublesome Appmon named Damedamon appears in their way.
45	"The Big Crash!? Gatchmon vs Agumon!"; Transliteration: "Dai Gekitotsu!? Gacchimon tai Agumon!" (Japanese: 大激突！？ガッチモンVSアグモン！)	August 12, 2017
Game characters from all over the country turn rogue by the hand of another of Leviathan's minions named Uratekumon and to stop them, Haru and Gatchmon are helped by Agumon, a character from the video game "Digimon Universe", that Haru played when he was younger. Note: The episode also pays tribute to the 20th anniversary of the Digimon franchise.
46	"The Oath Beneath the Starry Sky! The Great "Rescue for Astra" Operation!"; Transliteration: "Hoshizora no Chikai! Asutora Kyūshutsu Daisakusen!" (Japanese: 星空の誓い！アストラ救出大作戦！)	August 19, 2017
Torajirou is dragged by his uncle to a secluded temple for training and his friends set out to break him out. On their way, Rei warns Haru be careful around Yujin, as he is suspicious of him.
47	"The Truth about Yujin"; Transliteration: "Yūjin no Shinjitsu" (Japanese: 勇仁の真実)	August 26, 2017
Upon learning that Bootmon is hiding at Haru's school, the gang devises a plan to finally catch him. However, when Bootmon is cornered, Yujin reveals his true self and captures him under Leviathan's orders.
48	"Starting! The Design of Humanity Application!"; Transliteration: "Kidō! Jinrui Apurika Keikaku!" (Japanese: 起動！人類アプリ化計画！)	September 2, 2017
With Bootmon under his control, Yujin awakens the Omnipotent God Appmon, Deusmon, to start the final stage of Leviathan's plan to control the world. Analyzing data from Deusmon, Rei and Hajime create a special program to attain the God Grade as well, but while the others decide to fight to the end, Haru is still in shock with Yujin's betrayal.
49	"The Miraculous Final Evolution! The God Appmon Advent!"; Transliteration: "Kiseki no Saishū Shinka! Kami Apumon Kōrin!" (Japanese: 奇跡の最終進化！神アプモン降臨！)	September 9, 2017
Eri, Torajirou and Rei bring their Appmon to the God Grade to confront Deusmon, while Haru is attacked by Yujin. Still disheartened with the revelation that Yujin is an enemy, Haru refuses to fight back, until Gatchmon succeeds in cheering him up.
50	"The Bond of Hope! Haru and Gaiamon!!"; Transliteration: "Kibō no Kizuna! Haru to Gaiamon!!" (Japanese: 希望の絆！ハルとガイアモン！！)	September 16, 2017
At last Haru and Gatchmon join the fray against Leviathan, who materialized in the human world, and despite all God Appmon are consumed by Leviathan to empower him, Haru refuses to lose hope.
51	"The Dream of Artificial Intelligence"; Transliteration: "Jinkōchinō no Miru Yume" (Japanese: 人工知能の見る夢)	September 23, 2017
In a desperate effort to rescue their Appmon friends from Leviathan, Haru and co. attempt to hack inside it with Minerva's help in order to create a path for them to escape, but Yujin appears to interfere.
52	"Our Singularity"; Transliteration: "Bokutachi no Shingyuraritī" (Japanese: ボクたちのシンギュラリティー)	September 30, 2017
Reunited with their Appmon, Haru and his friends have their final battle against Leviathan to save the world.
