= Poco's Udon World =

Japanese manga and anime series

- Cover of first manga volume

うどんの国の金色毛鞠 (Udon no Kuni no Kin-iro Kemari)
- Genre: Slice of life
- Manga
- Written by: Nodoka Shinomaru
- Published by: Shinchosha
- Magazine: Monthly Comic @ Bunch
- Original run: August 2012 – February 2019
- Volumes: 12
- Anime television series
- Directed by: Seiki Takuno
- Written by: Natsuko Takahashi
- Music by: Yukari Hashimoto
- Studio: Liden Films
- Licensed by: Crunchyroll (streaming); NA: Discotek Media (home video)
- Original network: Nippon TV, RNC, BS NTV, Sun TV, MMT
- English network: SEA: Animax Asia
- Original run: October 9, 2016 – December 25, 2016
- Episodes: 12

Poco's Udon World (うどんの国の金色毛鞠, Udon no Kuni no Kin'iro Kemari; lit. 'The Golden Furball of Udon Country') is a Japanese manga series written by Nodoka Shinomaru. It began serialization in Shinchosha's magazine Monthly Comic @ Bunch in 2012 and has been collected into twelve tankōbon volumes. An anime television series adaptation by Liden Films aired from October 9 to December 25, 2016.

== Plot ==
The series revolves around the complicated but normal life of Souta Tawara, a young web designer from Tokyo who decides to return to his hometown in Kagawa following the death of his father and take a break from the city. Upon his return, he finds out that the family restaurant had stopped operating during his absence. While reminiscing about his childhood, Souta walks inside the closed restaurant and discovers a little boy sleeping inside a cooking pot. He realizes that this child is a form-changing tanuki that has been inhabiting Kagawa for many years. Thinking that the boy has been living a lonely life, Souta decides to adopt him and name him Poco.

Each episode follows the heartwarming relationship between Souta and Poco. Through the time they spend together, Souta recalls his own past, the place he left behind for the city, and his relationship with his father.

== Characters ==
Souta Tawara (俵 宗太, Tawara Sōta)
Voiced by: Yūichi Nakamura
Souta is the main protagonist and the son of a noodle restaurant owner. Born and raised in the Udon Prefecture, a fictional city inspired by Kagawa Prefecture, he had been living an depressed life in Tokyo as a web designer. Souta comes home after his father's demise to find the restaurant having gone out of business and a young boy that he names Poco hiding there.
Poco (ポコ, Poko)
Voiced by: Shiho Kokido
A young boy who is actually a magical tanuki (raccoon dog). He is adopted by Souta after he was found all alone hiding inside the closed-down restaurant.
Shinobu Nakajima (中島 忍, Nakajima Shinobu)
Voiced by: Tomokazu Sugita
Poco is Souta's friend from elementary school. He used to go fishing with Souta in the middle of the night before going to school. Poco is now an orthopedic surgeon.
Rinko Oishi (大石 凛子, Ōishi Rinko)
Voiced by: Mai Nakahara
Rinko is Souta's older sister who cannot deal with young children, but interacting with Poco and Souta changed that. She can be intimidating but cares well about Souta's well-being.
Shunsuke Fujiyama (藤山 俊亮, Fujiyama Shunsuke)
Voiced by: Jun Fukuyama
Shunsuke is Sae's older brother who works as a part-time DJ. He initially warned Souta that if a child wandered around alone in the area a tanuki could betray them after Poco ran off chasing Kaeru and ended up at the temple.
Sae Fujiyama (藤山 紗枝, Fujiyama Sae)
Voiced by: Kana Hanazawa
Sae is Shunsuke's younger sister. A former customer of Tawara Udon who visited there, she is devastated to find out it is no longer operating upon meeting Souta for the first time. Her workplace is situated around the corner from the noodle restaurant.
Mai Manabe (真鍋 舞, Manabe Mai)
Voiced by: Yuko Minaguchi
Mai is Souta's childhood friend. Since graduating from high school, she got married and now goes by Mai Tanaka. Mai is the mother to two children, Nozomi and Eitarou.
Nozomi Tanaka (田中 のぞみ, Tanaka Nozomi)
Voiced by: Kaede Hondo
Nozomi is Mai's daughter.
Fumi Yoshioka (喜岡 ふみ, Yoshioka Fumi)
Voiced by: Kujira
Fumi is a sharp-tongued old woman from next door. She was initially critical of Souta upon his return and mistakes Poco as his secret lovechild.
Nakajima's Mother (中島の母, Nakajima no Haha)
Voiced by: Akiko Kimura
Nakajima's Father (中島の父, Nakajima no Chichi)
Voiced by: Katsuhisa Hōki
Surgeon and Director of the local hospital, she operated on Souta when he sustained his leg injury as a teenager. He argues frequently with his son who works at another hospital in Ritsurin, raising doubts as to whether Shinobu will take over his hospital.
Gorou Hamada (浜田 吾郎, Hamada Gorō)
Voiced by: Takaya Kuroda
Nicknamed Dahama, Gorou is Sota's boss at 'team satellite', the web design company he works at in Tokyo. He first encounters Souta when visiting a hospital where Souta, as a teen, was a patient due to a leg injury. Seeing his enthusiasm for building Nakajima's fishing website, Dahama invites him to Tokyo after his recovery.
Hiroshi Nagatsuma (永妻 宏司, Nagatsuma Hiroshi)
Voiced by: Shinnosuke Tachibana
Hiroshi is Souta's younger colleague at team satellite who looks up to him. Hiroshi is the one that calls Souta back to Tokyo, after he has spent two weeks away in Kagawa, when the company is in trouble due to being right up against a project deadline.
Manabu Saeki (冴木 学, Saeki Manabu)
Voiced by: Kōsuke Toriumi
Saeki is president of Team Planet, an advertising agency in Shodoshima, who introduced to Souta by Dahama when he becomes a freelancer.
Yukie Saeki (冴木 雪枝, Saeki Yukie)
Voiced by: Yū Shimamura
Yukie is Manabu's wife who works at Team Planet.
Nakajima's Mother (中島の母, Nakajima no Haha)
Voiced by: Akiko Kimura
Nakajima was Souta and Rinko's mother who died more than 25 years before the current storyline.
Souta's Father (宗太の父, Souta no Chichi)
Voiced by: Hiroshi Naka
Former owner of the noodle restaurant Tawara Udon, he is Souta and Rinko's father. After his recent death, Souta is still in the mourning period when he returns to his hometown in Kagawa Prefecture.
Kaeru (カエル)
Voiced by: Yū Kobayashi
Kaeru is a frog that lives near Tawara Udon and that Poco often chases.
Vice Governor (副知事, Fuku-chiji)
Voiced by: Jun Kaname
An anime-only character, Udon Prefecture Vice Governor Kaname Jun is a native of Kagawa who provides preview narration and facts about the prefecture.

=== Gaogao-chan and the Blue Sky ===
Gaogao-chan (ガオガオちゃん)
Voiced by: Takaya Kuroda
Gaogao space alien from the Nebula M87 who crash-lands on Earth and comes to love it. Gaogao-chan is Poco's favorite TV character.
Mimi (ミミ) and Momo (モモ)
Voiced by: Yui Makino and Shiho Kokido
Two kinds of mechanics who Gaogao-chan comes to live with.

== Media ==
=== Manga ===
The original manga by Nodoka Shinomaru began serialization in Shinchosha's Monthly Comic Bunch magazine in August 2012. Twelve tankōbon volumes have been released by Shinchosha under the label Bunch Comics so far.

==== Volume list ====
No.	Release date	ISBN
1	December 8, 2012	978-4-10-771688-0
2	June 7, 2013	978-4-10-771709-2
3	December 9, 2013	978-4-10-771727-6
4	July 9, 2014	978-4-10-771759-7
5	December 9, 2014	978-4-10-771790-0
6	August 8, 2015	978-4-10-771838-9
7	February 9, 2016	978-4-10-771876-1
8	October 8, 2016	978-4-10-771925-6
9	January 1, 2017	978-4-10-771947-8
10	November 9, 2017	978-4-10-772025-2
11	September 7, 2018	978-4-10-772117-4
12	March 9, 2019	978-4-10-772167-9

=== Anime ===
A 12-episode anime adaptation was announced to air in October 2016. The anime was produced by Liden Films, directed by Seiki Takuno and written by Natsuko Takahashi. Eriko Itō handled the character designs and Yukari Hashimoto composed the music. It premiered on October 9, 2016, on NTV (Note: The series premiered on NTV at 25:55 on October 8, 2016, which is equivalent to 1:55 am on October 9, 2016) and later premiered on RNC on October 16, 2016. The opening theme is "S.O.S." by Weaver and the ending theme is "Sweet Darwin" by Good Warp. Crunchyroll streamed the series as it aired, while Discotek Media released the series on Blu-ray on May 26, 2020.

==== Episode list ====
No.	Title (Note: All English titles are taken from Crunchyroll.)	Original release date
1	"Bukkake Udon" (Japanese: ぶっかけうどん)	October 9, 2016
Souta Tawara returns home to Kagawa Prefecture and finds a sleeping child inside the closed udon restaurant, Tawara Udon, owned by his family. Souta decides to bring him to a police station but during his encounter with customers looking for Tawara Udon, the child transforms into a form-changing tanuki. Gaogao-chan and the Blue Sky #1 – "Gaogao-chan and the Blue Planet": The alien Ipalnemoani Gaogao has its spaceship crash landed on Earth near the mechanic shop owned by Mimi and Momo.
2	"Kotoden" (Japanese: ことでん)	October 16, 2016
Souta returns home terrified after leaving the tanuki but the following day, he saves it from an old lady in their neighborhood who has been angry due to the fields it destroyed. Souta and the tanuki, who is revealed to be a boy, befriend each other upon eating shoyumame. Souta brings him to a clothing shop near Kotoden and encounters his old classmate and first love Mai Manabe with her two children. He also introduces the boy as Poco. They have dinner at the sweet shop, where Poco befriends Manabe's daughter, Nozomi. Gaogao-chan and the Blue Sky #2 – "Gaogao-chan and the Kind Mechanics": Mimi and Momo fix Gaogao's broken spaceship and begin to call the alien "Gaogao-chan".
3	"The Red Lighthouse"; Transliteration: "Aka Tōdai" (Japanese: 赤灯台)	October 23, 2016
Souta's childhood friend Shinobu Nakajima drags him and Poco on a fishing trip early in the morning near the lighthouse. Nakajima mentions his mother nagging him about getting married, while Souta brings up the plans to sell his family's house and restaurant. Nakajima suggests Souta lead the udon business, causing him to recall the past when he told his father about going to Tokyo instead of taking over the restaurant. Their fishing trip ends when they have caught an octopus. Gaogao-chan and the Blue Sky #3 – "Gaogao-chan and Earth in Danger": Mimi and Momo bring Gaogao-chan by the sea to persuade it to reconsider its plan to conquer Earth. Suddenly, Octopus abducts the two mechanics but is later defeated by the alien.
4	"Yashima" (Japanese: 屋島)	October 30, 2016
Souta's older sister Rinko visits her brother to assist him in cleaning the house before it goes on sale and is introduced to Poco, who becomes afraid of her. She brings them to Yashima, where the siblings used to visit with their father in their childhood. Poco's leg slips in a crack at a vine bridge, but Rinko saves him, earning his trust. Gaogao-chan and the Blue Sky #4 – "Gaogao-chan and the Taste of First Love": Mimi and Momo help Timid Flower-san and Gaogao-chan on their first date.
5	"Chicken on the Bone"; Transliteration: "Honesuke Tori" (Japanese: 骨付鳥)	November 6, 2016
Souta asks Nakajima to tag along with him and Poco to their old high school after accepting Manabe's request to create a film for teachers that cannot attend their class reunion. Following the meeting with classic Japanese teacher Sonezaki and a regular customer of Tawara Udon named Sae Fujiyama, Souta and Poco accompany Nakajima to his parents' house. Nakajima and his father get into an argument so his mother invites them to an open-air bath. Souta convinces Nakajima to reconcile with his father. Back at his parents' residence, Nakajima finds his father's greenhouse growing pineapples, his favorite fruit. Later, Souta receives a phone call from his colleague in Tokyo informing him about the trouble they encountered at work. Gaogao-chan and the Blue Sky #5 – "Gaogao-chan and the Friends-Again Magic": Mimi and Momo get into an argument so Gaogao-chan digs a hot spring as a way to make the two reconcile.
6	"Tokyo Tower"; Transliteration: "Tōkyō Tawā" (Japanese: 東京タワー)	November 13, 2016
Souta returns to his Web designing company in Tokyo along with Poco. He asks his supervisor Gorou Hamada for an extended leave, while his colleague Hiroshi Nagatsuma meets Poco. Later at night, Poco is feeling sick when Nagatsuma suddenly pays a visit to Souta's apartment. Nagatsuma discovers Poco's tanuki form, but Souta dismisses it as his hallucination. The following day, Souta decides to stay in Kagawa and offers his resignation, but he decides to finish the project that has been assigned to him and Nagatsuma. Hamada then invites Souta, Poco, and Nagatsuma to the Tokyo Tower. Hamada then tells Souta that he has a friend in Shōdoshima with whom he can get in touch. Gaogao-chan and the Blue Sky #6 – "Gaogao-chan and the Resignation": Gaogao-chan returns to his home planet and offers his father the resignation from conquering Earth.
7	"Ritsurin Garden"; Transliteration: "Ritsurin Kōen" (Japanese: 栗林公園)	November 20, 2016
Although Souta and Poco have returned to Kagawa, the former has yet to commit to staying in his hometown permanently, but made it clear that he intends to remain a Kagawa resident for the foreseeable future. In the afternoon, Souta takes care of Nozomi before taking her and Poco to watch a stage performance. He reflects on how quickly children grow up as well as the struggles his father went through upon his wife's death. Souta finds creative solutions to Poco's misbehavior instead of adopting the firm approach taken by Nozomi's mother.
8	"Shoudo Island"; Transliteration: "Shōdo-shima" (Japanese: 小豆島)	November 27, 2016
On a trip to Shoudo Island, Souta and Poco become separated while trying to reunite a young tanuki with its parent.
9	"Dried Sardines"; Transliteration: "Iriko Dashi" (Japanese: いりこだし)	December 4, 2016
When a heartbroken Hiroshi visits Souta's house demanding him to cook Sanuki udon, they attempt to recreate a recipe that late Mr. Tawara taught them in show Poco's Udon World. Unfortunately, when Poco finds himself unable to retain his human form, Hiroshi comes close to learning the little tanuki's secret. Souta approaches the situation with calm resignation and tells Poco that he will treat him the same regardless of his form.
10	"Reservoir"; Transliteration: "Tameike" (Japanese: ため池)	December 11, 2016
The Tawara siblings clean the house in preparation for the anniversary of their mother's death alongside Poco and Nakajima. Much to everyone's surprise, Rinko insists on preparing their meal. However, when Rinko's culinary creation fails to impress even Poco's palate, her brother advises her not to bother with cooking if she cannot do it, leading her to storm off the house. After Nakajima approaches with Rinko, she suddenly reveals her pregnancy.
11	"Takamatsu Festival"; Transliteration: "Takamatsu Matsuri" (Japanese: 高松まつり)	December 18, 2016
Upon taking Poco to the local daycare, Souta accepts a job from Team Planet to help promote and livestream the upcoming Summer Festival.
12	"Kakeudon" (Japanese: かけうどん)	December 25, 2016
Souta and Poco go to the amusement park where the latter uses his tanuki magic to show the young man scenes of his past. Since Souta once saved him from a car accident, leading to his leg injury, Poco reveals that he has been watching the Tawara family for a long time. Before leaving the town, Poco takes one last opportunity to tell Souta how much everyone loves him. Heartbroken by this, Souta quits work in Tokyo to move to Kagawa.
