= Imoni =

Taro and meat soup from Tōhoku, Japan

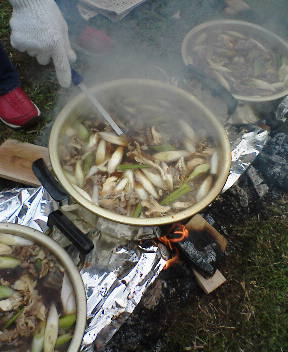
- Type: Soup
- Place of origin: Japan
- Region or state: Tōhoku region
- Main ingredients: Taro, meat

Imoni (芋煮) is a type of taro and meat soup eaten traditionally in the autumn in the Tōhoku region of Japan. Yamagata Prefecture in particular is famous for its imoni, but other prefectures in the region also have their own different varieties.

Imoni is eaten like any soup, primarily during the late summer and early autumn, but is most famous as an outdoor food. In the autumn, groups of people preparing imoni around a fire near a river is considered a sign of the season, and convenience stores maintain a stock of firewood and other supplies just for the occasion.

== Ingredients ==
The different recipes for imoni vary from prefecture to prefecture: for example, inland Yamagata imoni contains beef, sugar, and soy sauce and is sweet, while the imoni prepared in the neighbouring prefecture of Miyagi does not, but includes miso paste to flavour the soup. Similarly, even the Shōnai region of Yamagata features a pork and miso base rather than the beef and soy sauce base of inland areas of the same prefecture. However, several ingredients are considered standard parts of the recipe:

- Taro root (satoimo, Japanese: サトイモ/さといも, Kanji: 里芋)
- Thinly sliced meat, typically beef or pork
- Konnyaku, dense jelly made from the konjac plant
- Soy sauce

Other ingredients may include Chinese cabbage (hakusai), burdock root (gobō), daikon, carrot, negi (Japanese green onion), mirin sake, tofu, mushrooms - in particular shimeji, hiratake, shiitake, maitake - and region-specific modifications.

== Culture ==
In Yamagata Prefecture in particular, and its neighbours in general, imonikai (芋煮会 "imoni parties") are an important autumn tradition. Tourists flock to Yamagata for the Autumn Imoni Festival (Akino Imonikai) where they join local residents on the banks of the Mamigasaki River on the first Sunday in September, to eat imoni from a gigantic iron kettle, which uses a building crane to add ingredients and stir the pot. In 2009 the festival served imoni to 30,000 guests before the pot was empty.

Many schools and work organisations in Northern Japan arrange imonikai for their students or employees. Through September and October it is common to see groups of imonikai revellers on the banks of rivers, even near major highways.

== See also ==
- List of Japanese soups and stews
- Nabemono
- Japanese regional cuisine
- List of Japanese dishes
