= Ika sōmen =

Squid sashimi in fine strips

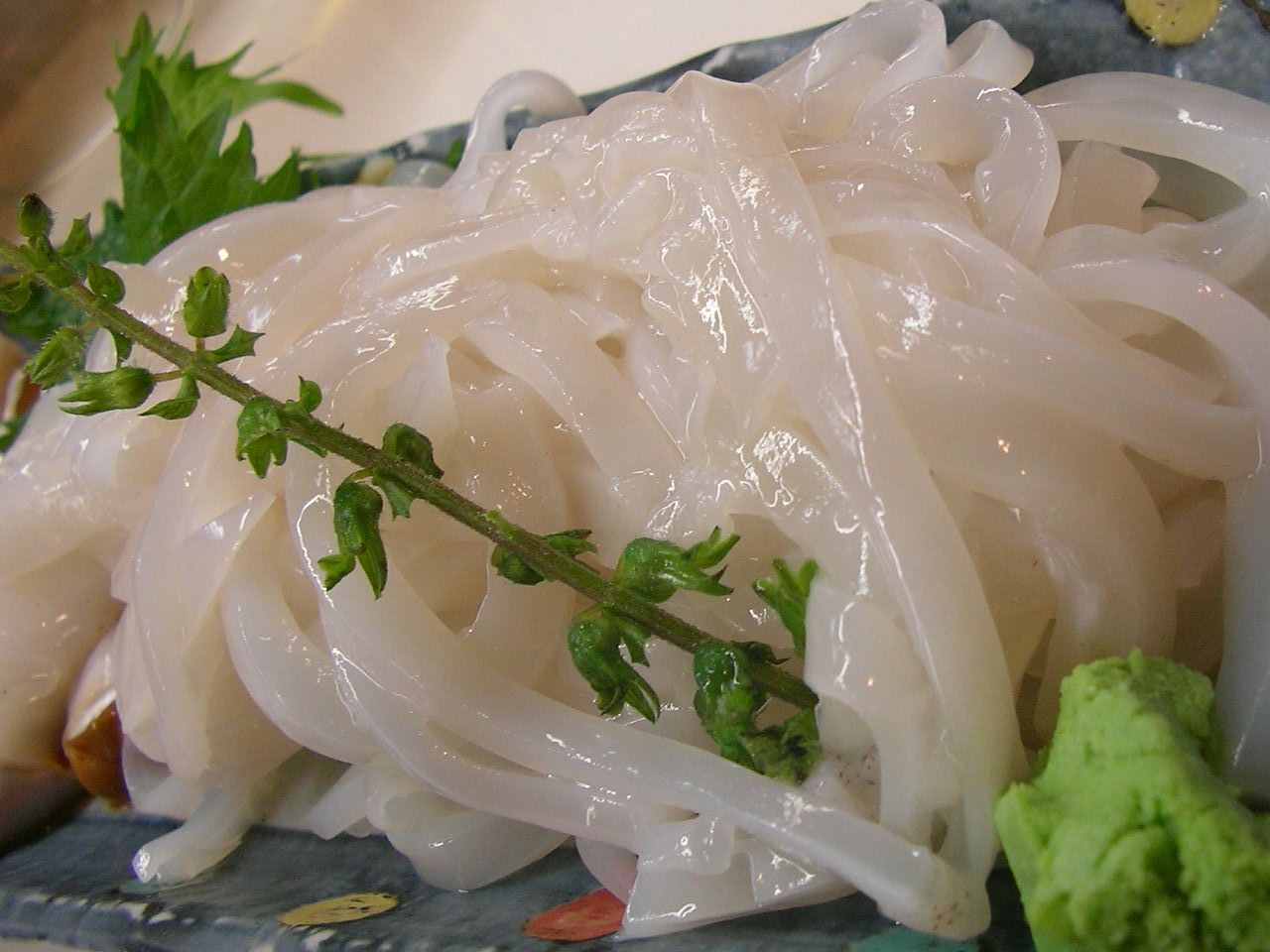
- Ika sōmen with wasabi, shiso flower stem and green shiso leaf. From a kaiseki restaurant
- Course: Side dish
- Place of origin: Japan
- Region or state: Hakodate, Hokkaido
- Associated cuisine: Japanese cuisine
- Main ingredients: Raw squid

Ika sōmen (イカそうめん, 烏賊素麺, いかソーメン; "squid noodles") refer to a type of sashimi that is made from raw squid cut into fine strips, vaguely resembling sōmen type noodles. They are typically served with grated ginger and soy sauce or a soy sauce-based mentsuyu sauce. They are slurped up, much in the way that noodles are eaten according to Japanese custom.

It is considered a specialty of Hokkaido, especially Hakodate, a fishing port where large catches of squid are hauled, though this regional notion has been challenged by availability in wider markets driven by commercialism.

== Nomenclature ==
The ika sōmen is not sashimi according to some sources, one such culinary reference making the comparison that while the squid is suited for the ika sōmen, the thicker-fleshed cuttlefish is more palatable for making into sashimi. However, it has also been pointed out that ika sōmen is synonymous with ito-zukuri or "thread cut", which is a technique in sashimi-slicing.

The name gained currency only in modern times. Hokkaido native and author Junichi Watanabe remarked in Kore wo tabe nakya—watashi no shokumotsushi ("Gotta eat this, my food history", 1995) that the term ika sōmen came into popular use only recently. In 1970, poet Kusumoto Kenkichi described a dish identical to ika sōmen ("a bowl (donburi) full of raw squid sliced like tokoroten noodles, with grated ginger and soy sauce") but mentioned that it went by the nickname umi no sōmen or "sōmen noodles of the sea". (Note: Note that umi sōmen is the traditional name for the eggs of the gastropod known as amefurashi (sea hares), a delicacy of Inaba Province (Tottori Prefecture). Cf. Tōson Shimazaki eating experience in the Uradome Coast, Tottori.)

== Preparation ==
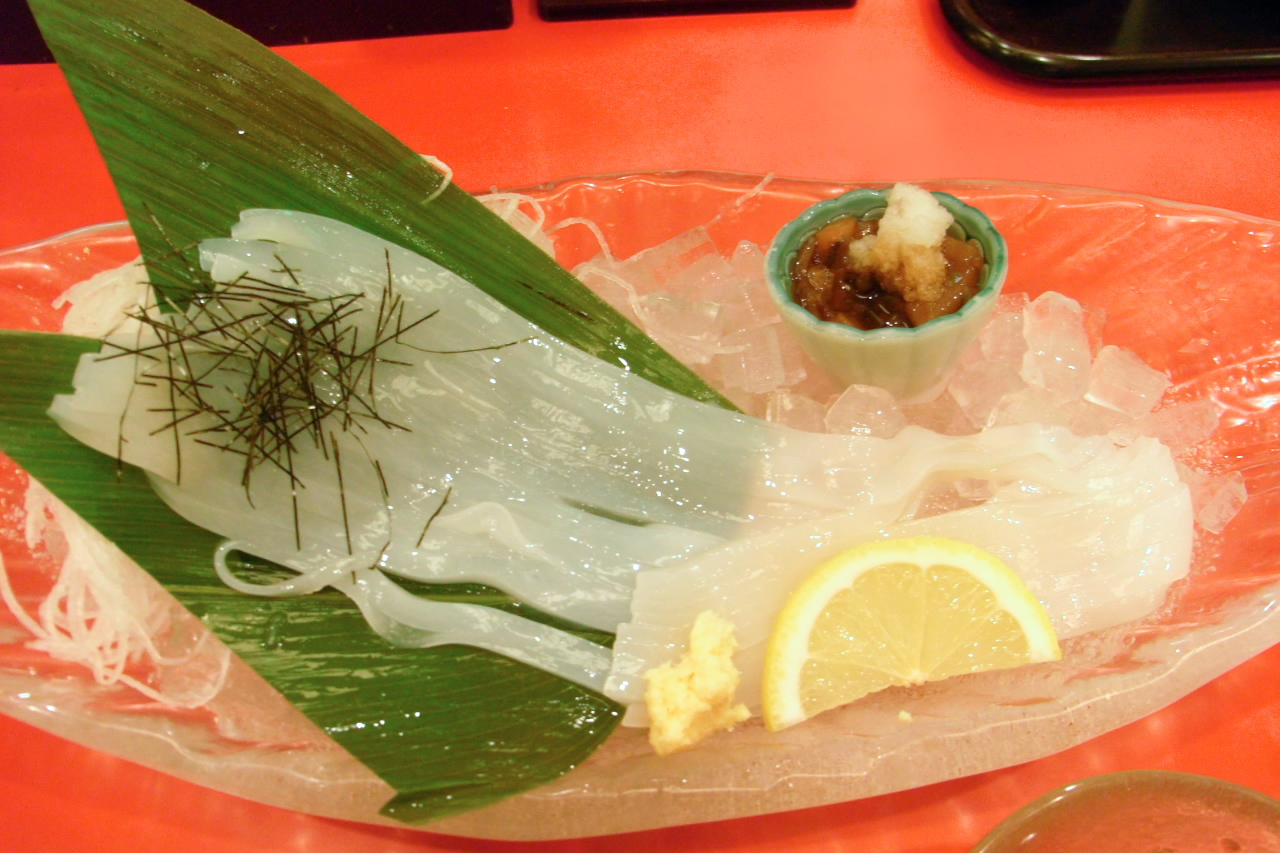
Ika sōmen made from raw spear squid, from a restaurant in New Chitose Airport

The squid's fillet is cut into half (or into thirds) and then into strips. Some cookbooks insist that the strips must be cut vertically along the "length of the squid along the grain" to prevent it from becoming overly chewy. The name suggests the strips resemble sōmen, i.e., as thin as vermicelli. Even though some sources take this literally, the description above likening it to "tokoroten" noodles suggest thicker strips, as do recipes that call for "5 mm (0.20 in) widths".

The typical way it is served is to have these "noodles" heaped in a bowl (donburi), accompanied by grated ginger and soy sauce, or a soy sauce-based noodle sauce, called mentsuyu. Lately, it may also be served on a flat dish even in Hakodate, Hokkaido, and eaten with wasabi and soy sauce, which is then little different from squid sashimi ito-zukuri style.

At port towns where the caught squid are brought ashore, the freshly caught squid are semi-translucent, have excellent texture, and are "sweet, especially the morning-caught squid shipped alive".

In Japan, the abundantly caught surume ika or Japanese flying squid, available from early summer onwards, is used to make this dish. In practice, other (more expensive) squid species are sometimes substituted, such as the yari ika (spear squid) or the aori ika (bigfin reef squid).

The ika sōmen has also become widely available prepacked in Japan.

As with uncooked seafood in general (see Sashimi#Safety), eating this dish made from raw untreated squid poses some risk of contracting anisakiasis, since the parasite when present in the animal infests the flesh of its body (mantle).

== See also ==
- Sashimi
- Japanese regional cuisine
