= Shiho Kokido =

Japanese voice actress from Tokyo

- 古城門志帆
- Born: December 20; Tokyo, Japan
- Occupation: Voice actress
- Years active: 2013–present
- Agent: Ken Production

Shiho Kokido (古城門志帆, Kokido Shiho; born December 20) is a Japanese voice actress from Tokyo. She is affiliated with Ken Production. Kokido's first leading role was in Go! Princess PreCure (2015) as Aroma, and since then she has starred as major characters in several titles.

== Filmography ==
=== Anime ===
2013

- Magi: The Labyrinth of Magic as Liliana, Sai Lin
- Noucome as Daiko Gondo

2014

- Majin Bone as young Luke/Shark
- Monster Retsuden Oreca Battle as Mimitoshishi
- Rail Wars! as Tsubatettsu

2015

- Brave Beats as Kotone Amamiya / Wink Beat
- Go! Princess PreCure as Aroma
- The Rolling Girls as Mii-tan

2016

- Digimon Universe: Appli Monsters as Torajirou Asuka
- Drifters as Olminu
- Poco's Udon World as Poco, Momo
- Sekkō Boys as Miki Ishimoto

2020

- Kakushigoto: My Dad's Secret Ambition as Yō Shiokoshi

2021

- Farewell, My Dear Cramer as Aya Shiratori

2025

- Hell Teacher: Jigoku Sensei Nube as Makoto Kurita

=== Dubbing ===
- A Series of Unfortunate Events as Klaus Baudelaire (Louis Hynes)
- Phoebe in Wonderland as Phoebe Lichten (Elle Fanning)
- The Powerpuff Girls (2016) as Princess Morbucks (Haley Mancini)
