= Jibu-ni =

Japanese meat stew dish

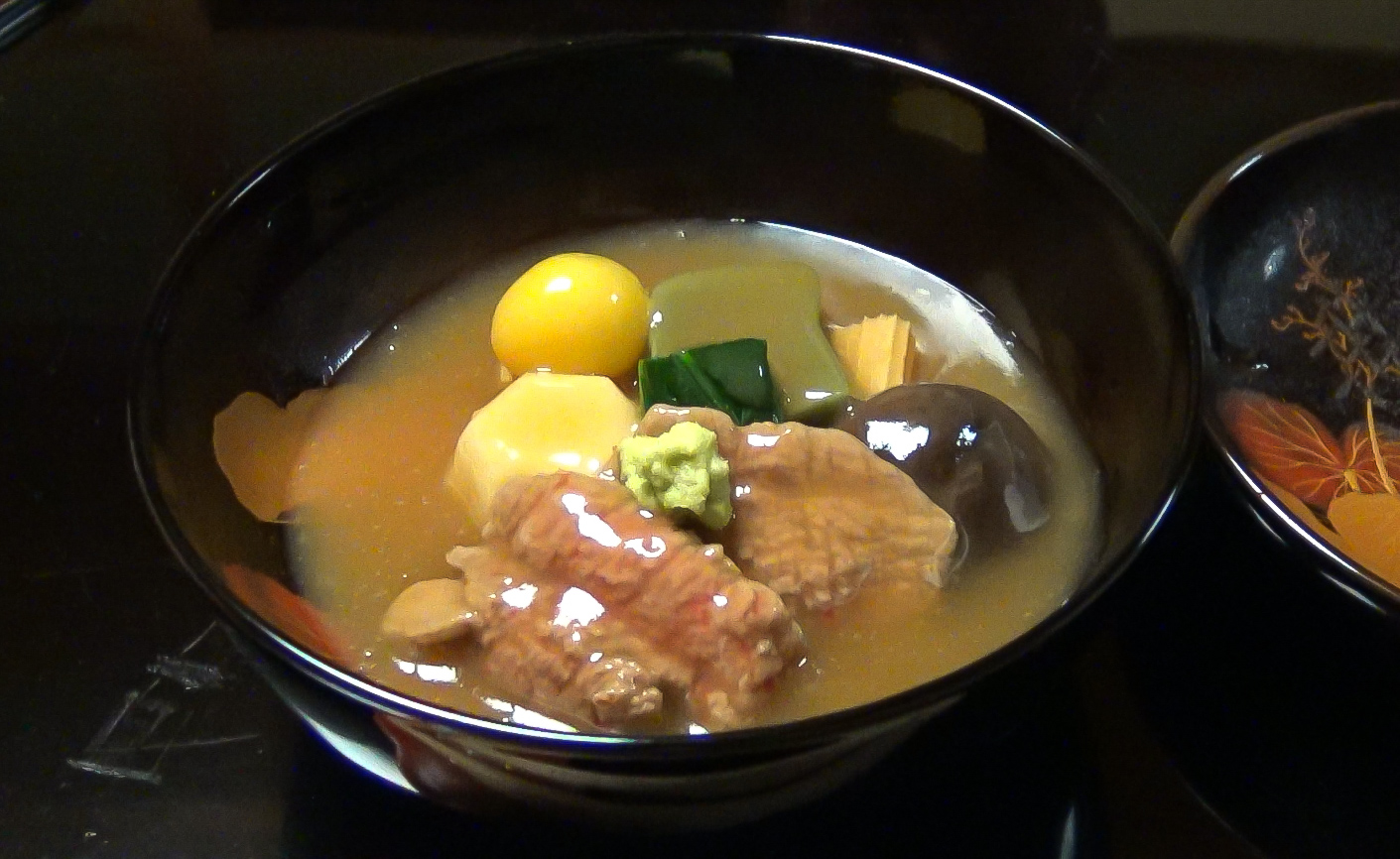
Jibu-ni

Jibu-ni (じぶ煮, 治部煮) is a Japanese dish that is part of the regional cuisine of Kanazawa and the surrounding Ishikawa region. It is a stew made from duck or chicken meat coated in flour, wheat gluten, vegetables, and mushrooms all simmered together in dashi stock. It is often served as part of kaiseki.
