= Digimon Universe: App Monsters =

Japanese anime series

- Cover of the first manga volume
- デジモンユニバース アプリモンスターズ
- Created by: Akiyoshi Hongo (concept); Toei Animation (story)
- Developed by: Yōichi Katō
- Directed by: Gō Koga
- Music by: Kōtarō Nakagawa
- Country of origin: Japan
- Original language: Japanese
- No. of episodes: 52 (list of episodes)

Production
- Producers: Masahiro Susagawa (TV Tokyo); Daichi Nagatomi
- Production companies: TV Tokyo; Dentsu; Toei Animation

Original release
- Network: TXN (TV Tokyo)
- Release: October 1, 2016 – September 30, 2017

Related
- Manga
- Written by: Akiyoshi Hongo
- Illustrated by: Naoki Akamine
- Published by: Shueisha
- Magazine: V Jump
- Original run: September 21, 2016 – August 21, 2017
- Volumes: 2
- Manga

Digimon Universe Appli Monsters: Appmon Gakuen
- Written by: Akiyoshi Hongo
- Illustrated by: Katsuki Hirose
- Published by: Shueisha
- Magazine: Saikyō Jump
- Original run: October 1, 2016 – August 4, 2017
- Video game
- Developer: Inti Creates
- Publisher: Bandai Namco Entertainment
- Genre: Role-playing game
- Platform: Nintendo 3DS
- Released: JP: December 1, 2016
- Digimon franchise
- Digimon Adventure; Digimon Adventure 02; Digimon Adventure tri.; Digimon Tamers; Digimon Frontier; Digimon Data Squad (Savers); Digimon Fusion (Xros Wars); Digimon Adventure (2020); Digimon Ghost Game; Digimon Beatbreak

Digimon Universe: App Monsters (Japanese: デジモンユニバース アプリモンスターズ, Hepburn: Dejimon Yunibāsu Apuri Monsutāzu) is a Japanese multimedia project created by Toei Animation, Bandai and Bandai Namco Entertainment, made in commemoration of Toei Animation's 60th anniversary. The series' theme revolves around technological singularity and artificial intelligence, a theme shared with the Appmons and the dangers of technology when used unwisely.

An anime television series, the seventh overall in the Digimon franchise, was produced by Toei Animation, directed by Gō Koga, written by Yōichi Katō, with character designs by Kenichi Ōnuki. It was broadcast for fifty-two episodes on all TXN stations in Japan from October 2016 to September 2017.

== Plot ==
In the year 2045, technology has finally evolved to a degree of prosperity for the world. The World Wide Web has become a world for "App Monsters" (アプリモンスターズ, Apurimonsutāzu) or "Appmons", artificially intelligent beings born within mobile apps.

The series focuses on Haru Shinkai, an ordinary Junior High Student. One day, he discovers an Appmon lurking in his smartphone, which introduced himself as Gatchmon. The duo become partners. Haru also learns from Gatchmon that the artificial intelligence Leviathan is creating viruses to turn all Appmons evil, and the two join forces to stop them.

As the series progresses, Haru gains the help of the rookie Japanese idol Eri Karan, the famous AppTuber Torajirou Asuka, the prodigy hacker Rei Katsura, who is in search for his younger brother that was kidnapped by Leviathan, and Haru's best friend Yūjin Ōzora, each one partnered with their own Appmon to help in the fight to defeat Leviathan and restore the balance between their two worlds.

== Characters ==
=== Haru Shinkai ===
Voiced by: Yumi Uchiyama

Haru Shinkai (新海 ハル, Shinkai Haru) is the male protagonist, a 13-year-old boy who likes reading and always saw himself as a secondary character, until he finds the AppliDrive and joins Gatchmon in his fight to stop Leviathan from taking over the world. His AppliDrive's color is red, later replaced by a red and gold AppliDrive DUO. Gatchmon (ガッチモン, Gatchimon) is Haru's Standard Grade partner Appmon, that is derived from a search app. He likes to look cool and his search function allows him to learn many things, including other people's secrets and the weak point of his enemies. He is voiced by Kokoro Kikuchi.

=== Eri Karan ===
Voiced by: Umeka Shōji

14 year old Eri Karan (花嵐 エリ, Karan Eri) is a member of the idol group "AppliYama 470". Cheerful and lively on the outside, she is actually very lonely. Her AppliDrive's color is blue, but is later replaced by a blue and gold AppliDrive DUO. She has a tendency to argue with Astra, due to their conflicting egos. Dokamon (ドカモン, Dokamon) is Eri's Standard Grade partner robot-like Appmon that was derived from an action game app. He has a strong and loyal attitude towards Eri, despite her habit of neglecting him and bossing him around. He is voiced by Motoko Kumai.

=== Torajirou Asuka ===
Voiced by: Shiho Kokido

Torajirou Asuka (飛鳥 虎次郎, Asuka Torajirō) is an 11 year old free-spirited half-British, half-Japanese boy and a famous "Apptuber", who uploads videos to the site "Apptube" under the alias "Astra". He comes from a wealthy and traditional family and only spends 30 minutes per day making videos for Apptube, as he also intends to inherit his father's tea shop business. His AppliDrive's color is yellow, but is later replaced by a yellow and gold AppliDrive DUO. Musimon (ミュージモン, Myūjimon) is Torajirou's Standard Grade partner Rabbit-like Appmon which was derived from a music app, who likes to go with the flow, just like his partner. He is voiced by Nao Tamura.

=== Rei Katsura ===
Voiced by: Toshiyuki Toyonaga

14 year old Rei Katsura (桂 レイ, Katsura Rei) is a mysterious hacker whose younger brother was kidnapped by Leviathan's followers. In spite of the fact that he is fighting Leviathan to rescue him, Rei refuses to cooperate with Haru and the others until they join forces to defeat Mienumon and he accompanies the group to the Deep Web. His AppliDrive's color is black, but is later replaced by a black and gold AppliDrive DUO. Hackmon (ハックモン, Hakkumon) is Rei's Standard Grade partner Appmon with hacking abilities. He is voiced by Daisuke Sakaguchi.

=== Yujin Ozora ===
Voiced by: Makoto Furukawa

Yujin Ozora (大空 勇仁, Ōzora Yūjin) is a 13-year-old boy. Yujin is Haru's childhood friend and a hot-blooded guy who is good with sports and is popular with the girls. His AppliDrive DUO's color is purple and white. It is later revealed that he is actually an android named YJ-14, that was created by Leviathan for intelligence gathering, and that the woman who appeared as his mother is actually a researcher of L Corp who created his robotic body. After Leviathan's body is destroyed, it takes over Yujin's body and gives Haru two choices: either let both Leviathan and Yujin die or let humanity be enslaved forever. Haru is about to choose stopping Leviathan, but Yujin takes back control of his body and makes that decision himself, dying in the process. Offmon (オフモン, Ofumon) is Yujin's Standard Grade partner Appmon, derived from an offline game app. He is voiced by Yū Shimamura.

== Production ==
Digimon Universe: App Monsters was developed as a contemporary reinterpretation of Digimon, reflecting the growing familiarity of children with smartphones and applications. Bandai proposed the Appmon Chip as the basis for the project, and Yōichi Katō participated in its planning before work on the television anime began. The planning document included the slogan "de-Digital Monster-ify". Series director Gō Koga explained that he accepted the project on the understanding that it would explore new ideas rather than repeat previous installments. He described this approach as inheriting the pioneering spirit of Digimon Adventure. Koga subsequently clarified that departing from established conventions did not mean opposing Digimon: the staff could retain successful elements from earlier works while changing those they considered less suited to the contemporary setting. Producer Daichi Nagatomi explained that the "Digimon Universe" title reflected an ambition to develop Digimon as a lasting brand that could accommodate different creative approaches and connect generations of viewers.

Artificial intelligence became a central subject during development, linking the story to technologies increasingly present in everyday life. Hiromi Seki, who had independently considered AI as a basis for a new Digimon series, recommended films and television works that helped Yōichi Katō develop his understanding of the subject. The staff explored what distinguishes humans from AI, what makes human life meaningful, and how humanity might coexist with intelligence surpassing its own. Kenji Watanabe also prompted discussion about whether an AI could truly evolve without departing from its ethical rules. Katō explained that the team wanted to explore AI beyond the familiar premise of a hostile intelligence threatening humanity, depicting varied relationships with humans without prescribing a single definitive model for how AI should behave. This emphasis also informed Haru Shinkai's characterization: Katō wanted a protagonist whose kindness and consideration for others would guide his actions, while showing that kindness also required the strength to face difficulties.

The use of 3DCG for Appmon fusion and evolution sequences was a deliberate artistic choice. Gō Koga explained that the team wanted to express the Appmon's nature as data-based lifeforms by representing their very essence as data. They therefore chose visibly three-dimensional CGI with a sense of physical texture and solidity, rather than rendering it to resemble cel animation. Although the resulting models would stand out against the animated backgrounds, Koga intended this distinction to convey the Appmon's evolution into Super Appmon. Daichi Nagatomi added that Appmon inhabit the Internet and differ from organisms native to the real world, making this tactile quality particularly appropriate for their evolved forms. Koga emphasized that allowing the CGI to look recognizably like CGI reflected the pioneering spirit he considered necessary for a new incarnation of Digimon.

Discussing the initial response, Nagatomi estimated that approximately 70% of the reactions received were skeptical and 30% supportive. He also recalled receiving numerous comments after the first cour from viewers who had doubted Appmon but recognized Digimon's qualities in it.

== Media ==
=== Anime ===
The anime adaptation of the series began airing on all TXN stations in Japan on October 1, 2016, replacing Time Travel Girl on its original timeslot, and aired until September 30, 2017. The series's opening theme from episodes 1 to 25 is "DiVE" by Amatsuki and from episodes 26 to 52, "Gatchen!" by SymaG. The ending theme from episodes 1 to 13 is "Aoi Honoo Syndrome" (青い炎シンドローム, Aoi honō shindorōmu; "Blue Flame Syndrome") by Riho Iida, from episodes 14 to 25, "Ai" (アイ; "Eye") by Ami Wajima, from episodes 26 to 38, "Little Pi" by Ange☆Reve and from episodes 39 to 52, "Perfect World" (パーフェクトワールド, Pāfekutowārudo) by Traffic Light.

=== Manga ===
A manga series adaptation by Naoki Akamine and was serialized in Shueisha's V Jump magazine from September 21, 2016, to August 21, 2017. Another manga series by Katsuki Hirose, titled Digimon Universe Appli Monsters: Appmon Gakuen (デジモンユニバース アプリモンスターズ アプモン学園, Dejimon Yunibāsu Apuri Monsutāzu Apumon Gakuen), was serialized in Shueisha's Saikyō Jump magazine from October 1, 2016, to August 4, 2017.

== Reception ==
The series placed 12th on the 2018 Tokyo Anime Award Festival's Anime Fan Award.
