= Ami Wajima =

Japanese singer

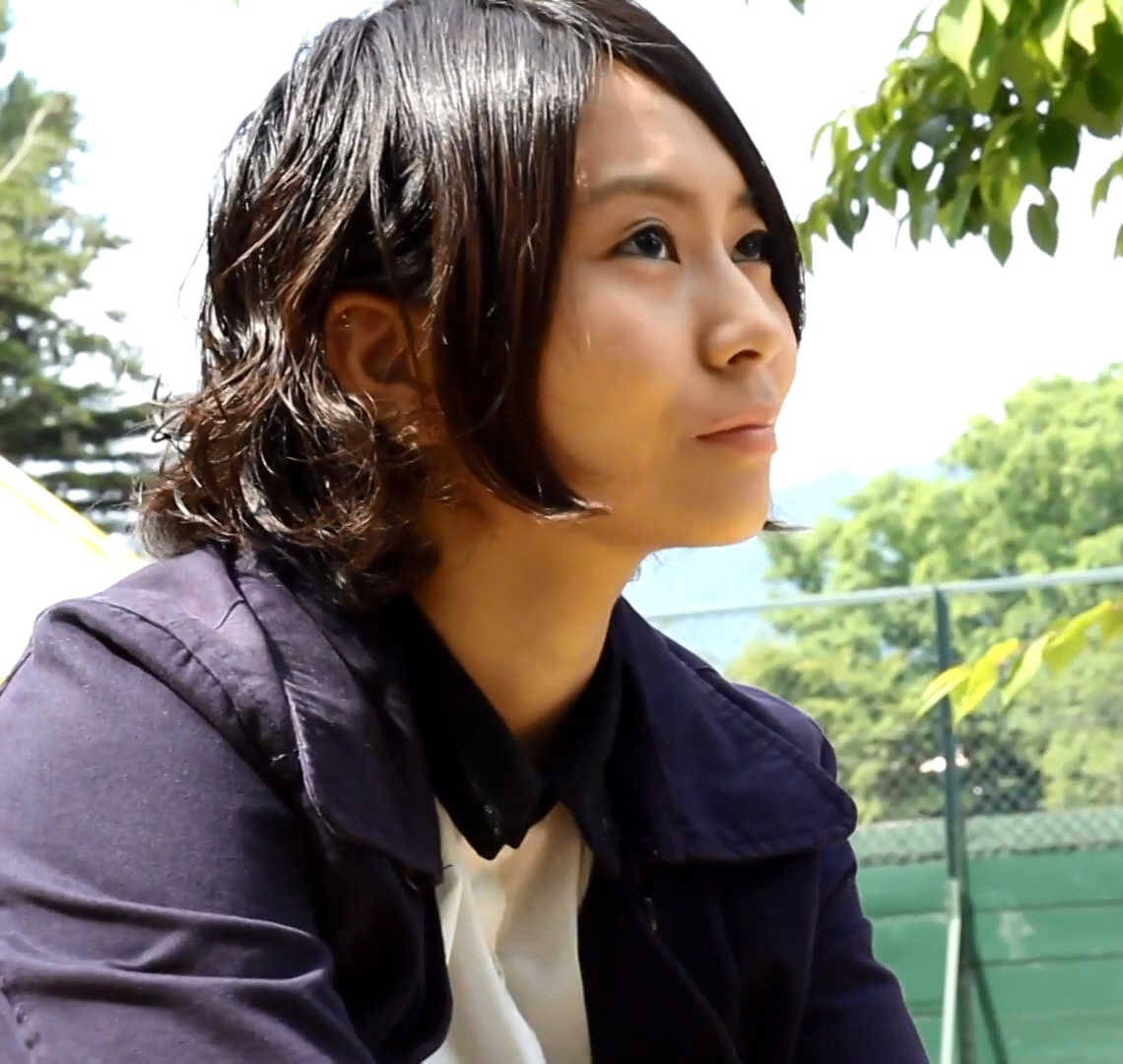

Background information
- Born: December 29, 1998 (age 27); Kutchan, Hokkaido, Japan
- Origin: Japan
- Genres: J-Pop
- Years active: 2016 – 2017, 2018 – present
- Label: Pony Canyon
- Website: amiwajima.com

Ami Wajima (和島あみ, Wajima Ami; born December 29, 1998) is a singer from Kutchan, Hokkaido who is signed to Pony Canyon. After passing an audition held by the Japanese entertainment agency Horipro, she debuted in May 2016 with her first single "Gensō Drive", the title track of which was used as the opening theme to the Japanese anime television series The Lost Village. She released her first album I Am in February 2017.

Wajima's music has been used in The Lost Village, Kuromukuro, and Digimon Universe: Appli Monsters. She has also performed in China, the Philippines, Singapore, and Indonesia. In July 2017, her management announced that she would put her career on hiatus for health reasons. She resumed her music activities in March 2018.

== Biography ==
Wajima was born in Kutchan, Hokkaido on December 29, 1998. From an early age, she loved to sing; however, her voice was frequently mocked during her elementary years. Due to bullying, she stopped going to school after her first semester of middle school. After listening to the music of Akina Nakamori, she regained confidence, and after her original school merged with another school, she eventually resumed her schooling. While she was studying in a high school in Sapporo, she attended the P's Voice Artist School in Hokkaido, and she worked part-time to support her studies. She also became interested in anime music and decided that she wanted to become an anison singer. At the urging of her family and friends, she decided to participate in an audition held by the talent agency Horipro and record label Pony Canyon. Although she passed the initial screening, she nearly decided to withdraw from the competition, as the final judging was to be held in Tokyo and Osaka, which were far from Hokkaido. With the support of her father, she decided to push through with her application, and she went on to win the audition grand prize, beating more than 10,000 other applicants. Following her winning the audition, she was offered a contract with Pony Canyon.

Wajima made her major debut in May 2016 with the release of her first single "Gensō Drive" (幻想ドライブ, Fantasy Drive), the title track of which was used as the opening theme to the anime television series The Lost Village; the single peaked at number 43 on the Oricon weekly charts. She later made her first overseas appearance at the Bilibili Macro Link event in Shanghai, China in July 2016. She released her second single "Eien Loop" (永遠ループ, Eternal Loop) on August 10, 2016; the title track is used as the second ending of the 2016 anime television series Kuromukuro; the single peaked at 102 on the Oricon weekly charts. She made an appearance at Animax Carnival Philippines in October 2016, and at Anime Festival Asia Singapore in November 2016. She also made an appearance at Animax Musix 2016 in Yokohama. She held a birthday event for her fans on December 29, 2016. Her first album I Am was released on February 22, 2017; the album includes the song "Ai", which was used as the ending theme to the anime television series Digimon Universe: Appli Monsters. I Am peaked at 220 on the Oricon weekly charts.

On July 11, 2017, Wajima's management announced that she would put her career on hiatus due to poor health. Her upcoming appearances, including an appearance at Anime Festival Asia Indonesia, a series of duet concerts with artists Haruko Momoi and Faylan, and a solo concert planned for December 2017, were cancelled.

In March 2018, Wajima's management announced that she would resume her music activities with a solo concert in May of that year. This was followed by an appearance at C3 AFA Indonesia 2018. Her third single, a cover of the song "Kowarekake no Radio" (壊れかけのRadio, Broken Radio) by Hideaki Tokunaga, was released in October 2018; the title track is used as the ending theme to the anime series The Girl in Twilight.

== Discography ==
Singles

- Gensō Drive (幻想ドライブ) (2016)
- Eien Loop (永遠ループ) (2016)
- Kowarekake no Radio (壊れかけのRadio) (2017)

Albums

- I Am (2017)
