= Shoyumame =

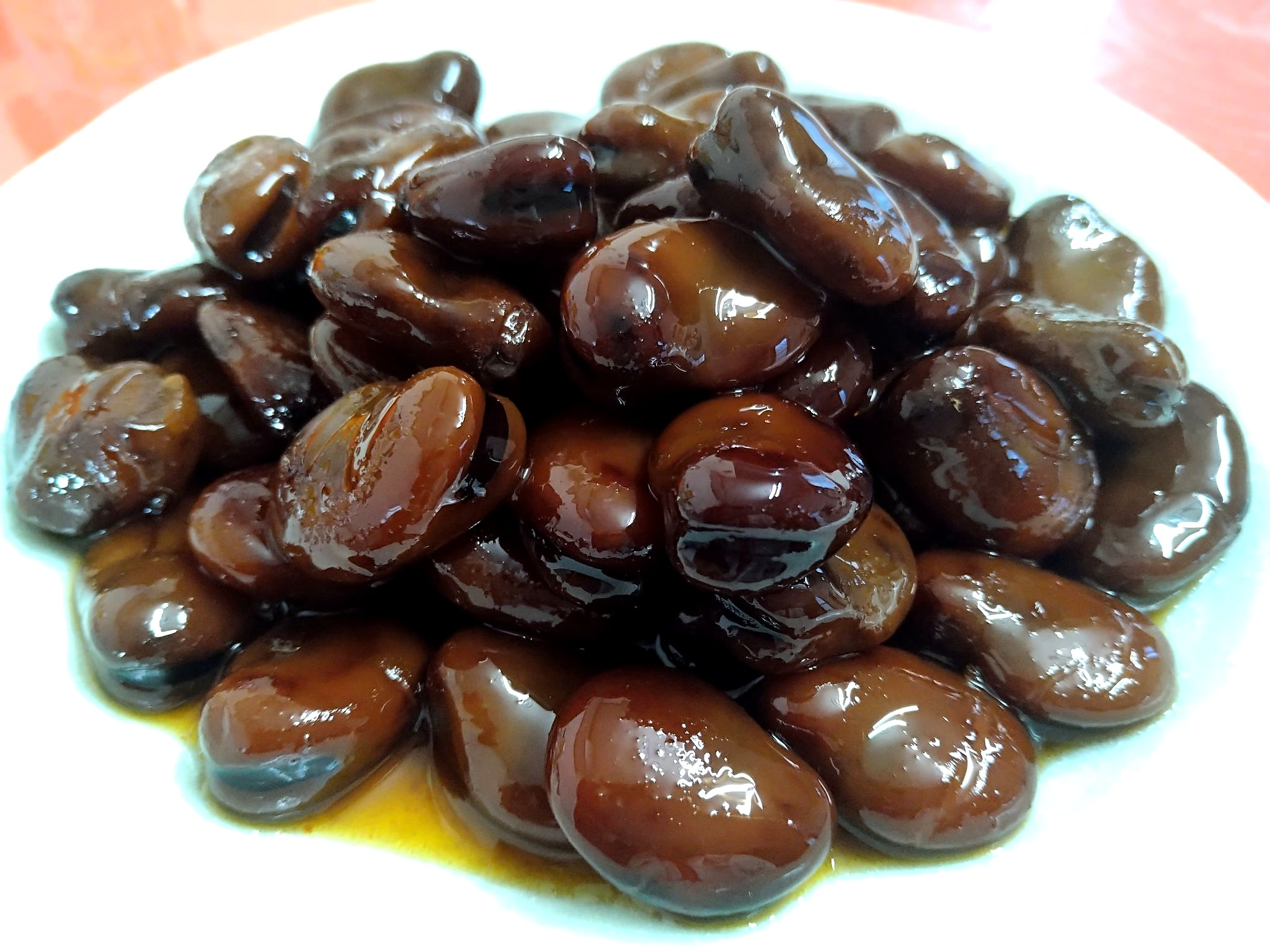
A picture of Shoyumame

Shoyumame (しょうゆ豆) is a regional cuisine of the Kagawa prefecture of Japan. Shoyumame consists of parched broad beans left overnight in a marinade consisting primarily of soy sauce and sugar, with mirin and sake usually included in the marinade. It is commonly served alongside lunch or dinner, or as an accompaniment to alcohol. Although similar in appearance, shoyumame should not be confused with shoyunomi—a regional dish of Nagano, Niigata, Yamagata and Kagoshima prefectures, which consists of steamed black beans that have been fermented in soy sauce with rice malt.
