= Shūhei =

- Gender: Male

Origin
- Origin: Japanese
- Meaning: Different meanings depending on the kanji used

Shūhei, Shuhei or Shuuhei (written: 周平, 修平, 秀平, 脩平 or シュウヘイ in katakana) is a masculine Japanese given name. Notable people with the name include:

- Shuhei Akasaki (赤﨑 秀平; born 1991), Japanese footballer
- Shuhei Aoyama (青山 周平; born 1984), Japanese motorcycle racer
- Shuhei Fujioka (potter) (born 1947), Japanese potter
- Shuhei Fujisawa (藤沢 周平; 1927–1997), Japanese writer
- Shuhei Fukuda (福田 秀平; born 1989), Japanese baseball player
- Shuhei Hotta (堀田 秀平; born 1989), Japanese footballer
- Shuhei Kuji (久慈 修平; born 1987), Japanese ice hockey player
- Mainoumi Shuhei (舞の海 秀平; born 1968), Japanese sumo wrestler
- Shuhei Matsuhashi (松橋 周平; born 1993), Japanese rugby union player
- Shuhei Nakamoto (中本 修平; born 1957), Japanese automotive engineer
- Shuhei Nakamura (中村 修平; born 1981), Japanese Magic: The Gathering player
- Shuhei Naruse (鳴瀬 シュウヘイ), Japanese musician and composer
- Shuhei Nishida (西田 修平; 1910–1997), Japanese pole vaulter
- Shuhei Otsuki (大槻 周平; born 1989), Japanese footballer
- Shūhei Sakaguchi (阪口 周平; born 1977), Japanese voice actor
- Shuhei Sasahara (笹原 脩平; born 1996), Japanese footballer
- Shuhei Tada (多田 修平; born 1996), Japanese sprinter
- Shuhei Takada (髙田 周平; born 1985), Japanese baseball player
- Shuhei Takahashi (高橋 周平; born 1994), Japanese baseball player
- Shuhei Taniguchi (谷口 周平; born 1976), Japanese professional wrestler
- Shuhei Terada (寺田 周平; born 1975), Japanese footballer
- Shuhei Uchida (内田 修平; born 1989), Japanese Go player
- Shuhei Yoshida (吉田 修平), Japanese businessman

== Fictional characters ==
- Shuhei Hisagi, a character from the manga series Bleach
