= Donabe =

Japanese clay pot

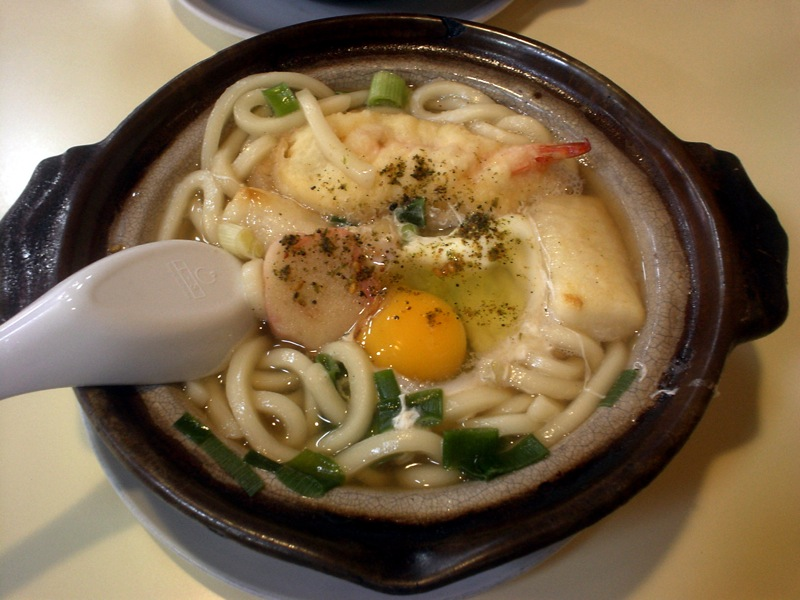
Various ingredients in nabeyaki udon (pot-cooked noodle) using a donabe

Donabe (Japanese: 土鍋, literally "earthenware pot") are pots made out of a special clay for use over an open flame in Japanese cuisine, and in the case of semi-stoneware Banko ware of high petalite content. (Note: According to 萬古陶磁器卸商業協同組合 (Banko Tōjiki Oroshi Shōgyō Kyōdō Kumiai) wholesalers of Banko ware pottery, they claim to ship close to 80% of donabe in the wholesales market, and reasons that the high content of lithium, or petalite, in the pottery clay reaches up to 40-50% of the volume. They say the clay keeps their donabe popular for the excellent heat resilience against direct flame such as gas cooking stove and charcoal fire, or even when being boiled dry.) Often, the food is cooked at the table on a gas burner for various nabemono dishes such as shabu-shabu and dishes served simmering including nabeyaki udon. They are sized by sun, one of the Japanese units of measurement.

The donabe is usually glazed on the inside (Note: A Shigaraki ware potter had introduced silica coat applied on the inside of donabe as to replace fluoropolymer coating which he was not satisfied but wore down after years of scrubbing with cooking and washing tools. He claims that silica hardens the inside surface of the pot, which makes it easier to fry and grill foods in donabe with less burn in the bottom.) and porous on the outside. While the material is similar to earthenware or stoneware, donabe can be used over an open flame as well as in an oven if three precautions are taken. First, the outside of the donabe should be dry before use, as moisture within the clay will expand in the heat and may chip or crack the pot. Secondly, the pot should be heated gradually to reduce the possibility of cracks due to heat stress. Third, the pot should never be left over the flame while empty.

Donabe is a traditional cooking vessel. It is made from a clay that is porous and coarse. In the area around Iga, Iga-yaki (Iga-style) donabe, have been made since 1832; Iga-yaki pottery in general dates back to the 7th century and is highly valued. It became particularly popular for donabe during the Edo Period. The highest-quality donabe can take two weeks to make. There are multiple styles of donabe made for the preparation of different dishes. Donabe can be used over an open flame, and food is often served out of the donabe.

A culture surrounding donabe developed called "nabe o kakomu", which means "surrounding the pot" or a communal meal. The concept has been featured repeatedly in the media and in donabe cookbooks.

With use, donabe develop a patina of crackling of the interior glaze called kannyu. This patina is valued as a sign of character.

If properly treated, these pots should last for decades and a few special ones have survived for centuries. When a new donabe is obtained, one should let the donabe boil water for hours and dry before using it for cooking. Other sources suggest that the user should simply fill the donabe with water and let it sit overnight. This process should be repeated if the donabe has been unused for a long time.

In old ryoutei of Kyoto, decades-old donabe would be stored and only used for special guests. Young donabe would be used for preparing lunch menus and food for cooks, to age them for this purpose.

Donabe is produced by potters of Banko ware, Iga ware, Shigaraki ware, and Mashiko ware.

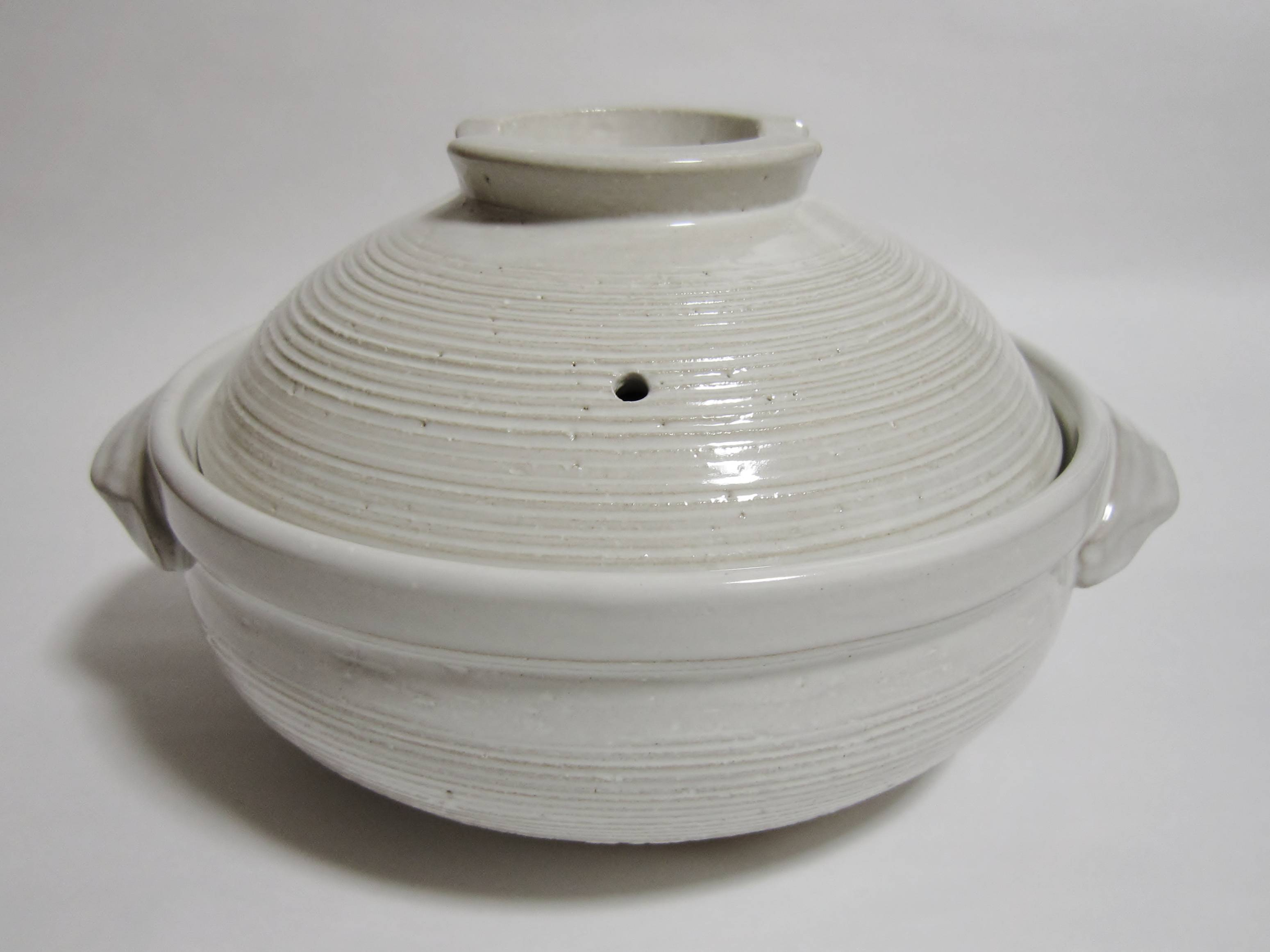

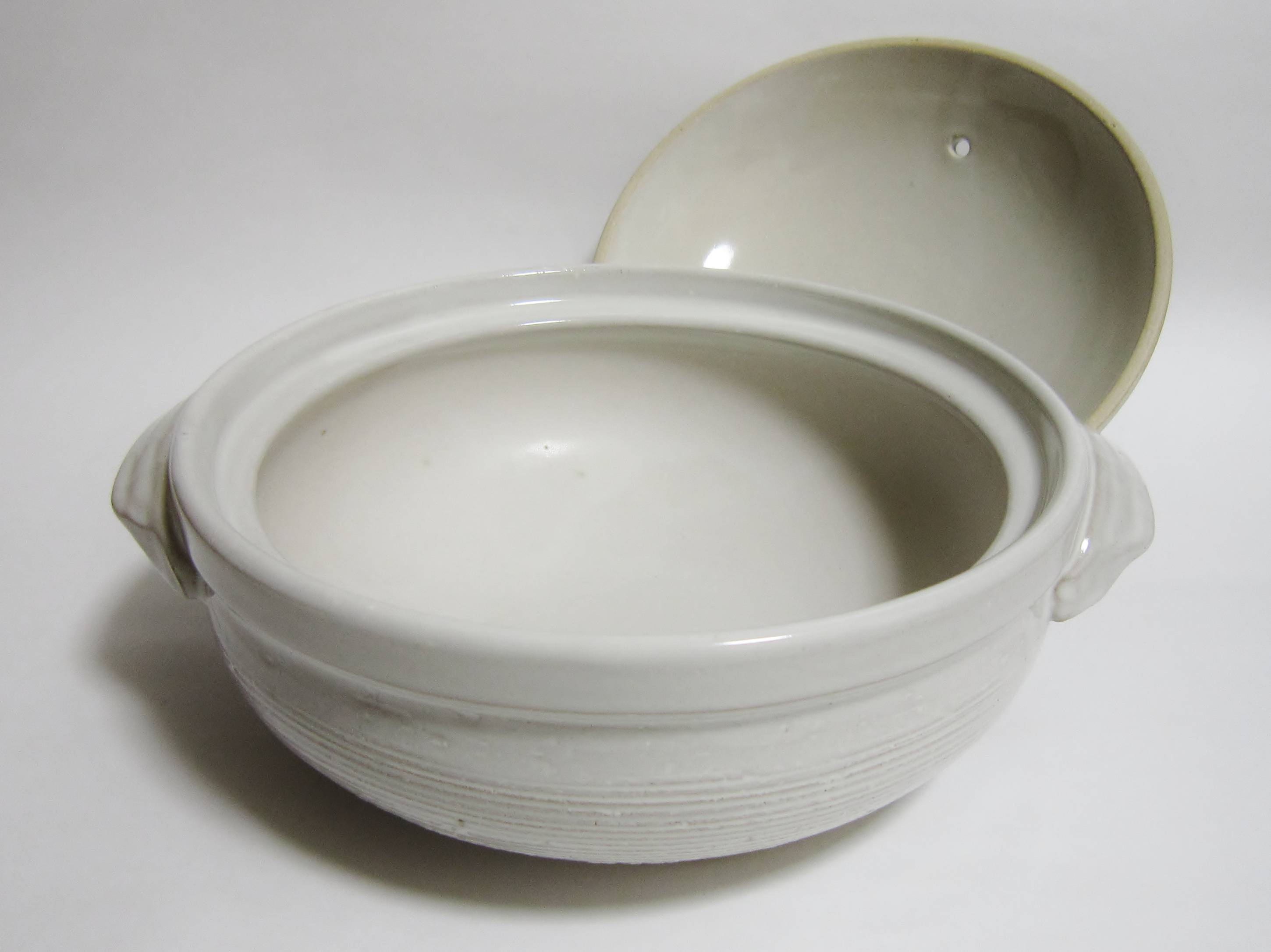

The pots are made by kneading clay, then forming and trimming the formed vessels. They are partially dried and then knobs and handles applied. After another period of drying, they are fired, glazed, and fired again.

== See also ==
- Clay pot cooking
- List of Japanese cooking utensils
