= Iga ware =

Style of Japanese pottery

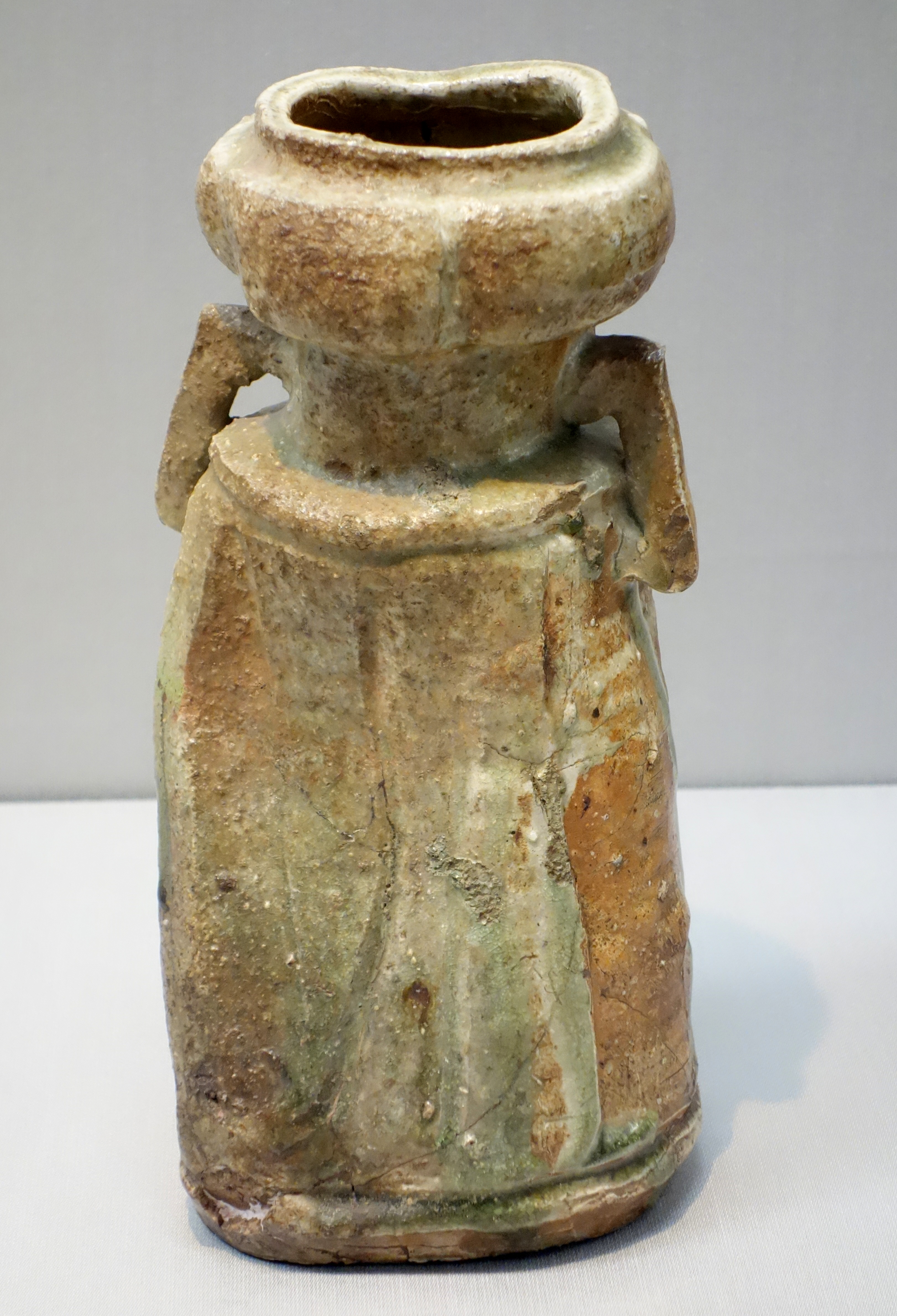
Iga ware flower vase with "ear" lugs, 17th century, Edo period

Iga ware (伊賀焼, Iga-yaki) is a style of Japanese pottery traditionally produced in Iga, Mie, former Iga Province, central Japan.

== History ==
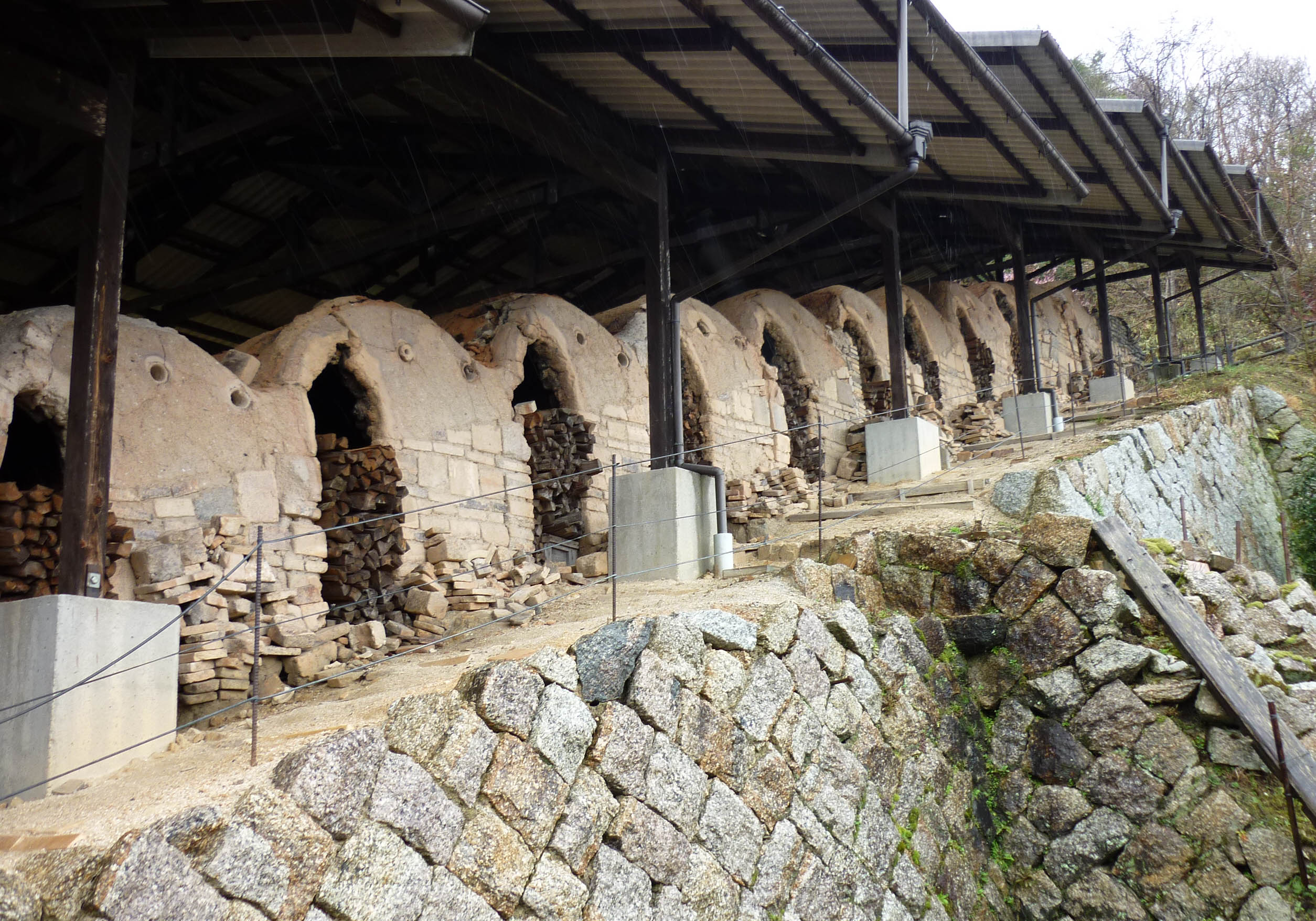
Climbing Kiln (noborigama) in Nagatanien, which was used until the mid-1960s

Iga ware's origins are believed to date to the second half of the 7th century and 8th century CE. The area has long produced a clay known for its high resistance to fire. In the early phase it did not differ from nearby Shigaraki ware.

The kilns are thought to have been established during the Keichō era (1596–1615) under the rule of Lords Tsutsui Sadatsugu (1562–1615) and later Tōdō Takatora (1556–1630) and Tōdō Takatsugu (1602–1676) of Iga Province. The most well-known kilns were at Makiyama and Marubashira, in the Ayama district of Iga city.

Historically, in a Japanese tea ceremony room, vases used to be made out of cut bamboo in order to match the ambiance of the room. Precious vases were offered as gifts to feudal daimyō lords. Starting in the late 16th century Momoyama period, Iga ware water vases with characteristic "ear" lugs appeared. The ear lugs added prestige to a vessel and thus became the popular norm. Since then the ears have become a mark of not only Iga flower vessels but also mizusashi water jars. They were used as Japanese tea utensils under master Sen no Rikyu and others. Old Iga ware, which is known as Ko-Iga, generally reflects wabi-sabi aesthetics with a rustic appearance and purposefully deformed shapes, given extra character by the addition of "ear" lugs (katamimi) and intentional gouges and dents (herame). Many pieces are finished with the classic, glass-like bidoro glaze formed by ash. A number of pieces from this period have been registered by the government. The mizusashi called "Broken Pouch" (破袋, yabure-bukuro) has been registered as an Important Cultural Property.

Kishimoto Kennin (b. 1934) is an artist who makes Oribe and Shino ware; it is, however, his Iga ware that is considered some of his most outstanding work. Tanimoto Kei (谷本景) (b. 1948) and Tanimoto Yoh (谷本洋) (b. 1958) are traditional artists who specialise in Iga ware water jars and vases. Other artists are Fujioka Shuhei (藤岡周平) (b. 1947) who studied in the 1970s under master potter Tanimoto Mitsuo, Takemura Osamu, and Hasu Yoshitaka (蓮善隆) (b. 1949). Furutani Michio (古谷道生) (1946-2000) was an artist who made works not only in Iga but also Shigaraki ware, which has similarities. He was succeeded by his son Furutani Kazuya (古谷様和也) (b. 1976).

Modern Iga ware is known for earthen pots with a distinctive shape used in kitchens and households. One of the known kilns is the Iga Mono kiln, which has been in operation since the Edo period. Also well-known is the Doraku kiln (土楽窯, Doraku-gama) in Marubashira, which has been in operation since seven generations and specialises in the production of donabe pots. One of the artists who works at Doraku is Fukumori Masatake (福森雅武).

== Characteristics ==
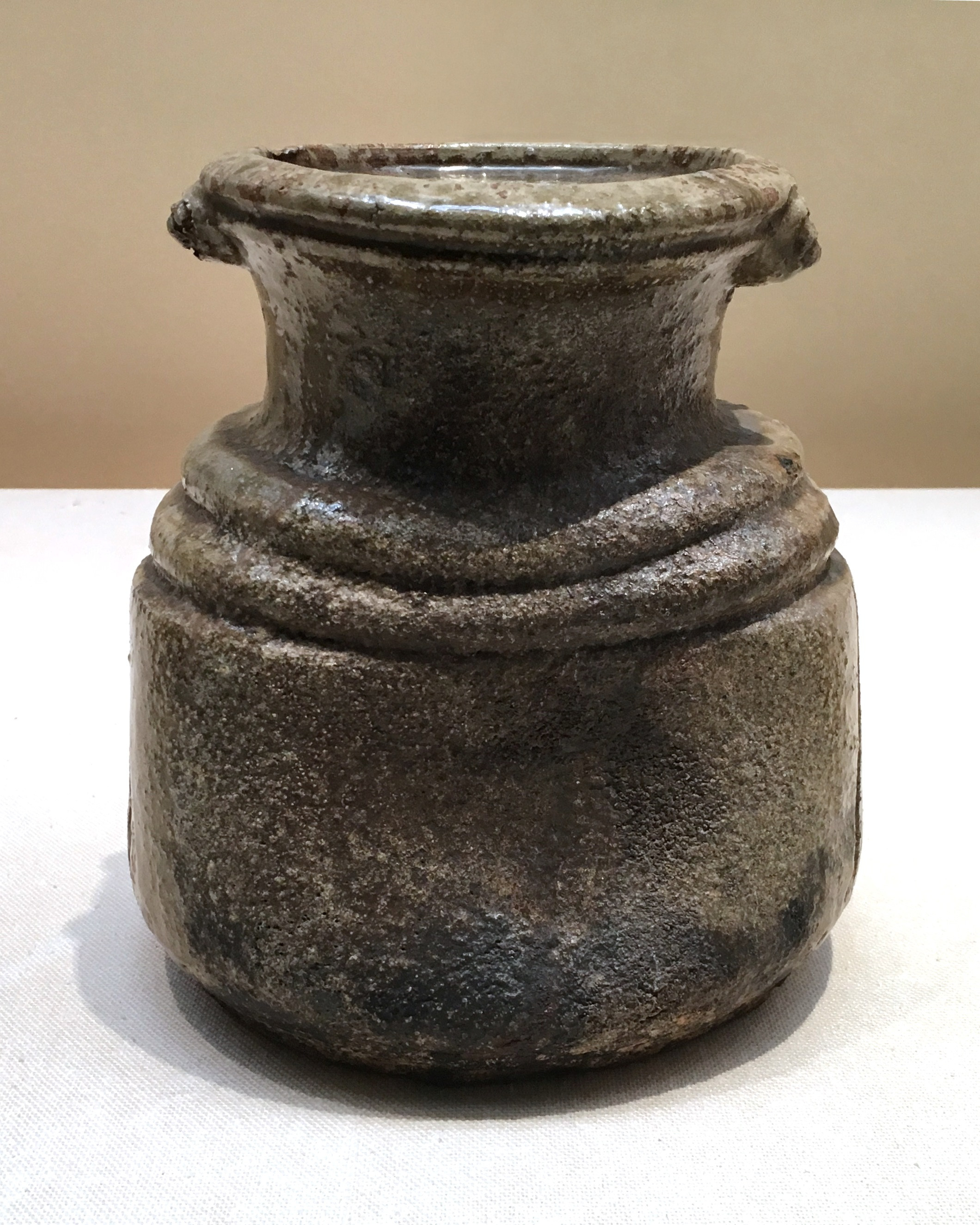
Fresh-water mizusashi container, with two decorative grains. Momoyama period, 17th century

Iga ware uses local clay which is extremely resistant to heat, reacts well to repeated firing, and is fired over three days in a kiln dug into the ground.

The clay tends to have a high level of hardness and is created on a pottery wheel. The potter delicately uses a spatula to give curvature. This distinctive curve lets the flames lick over the round edge. Furthermore, tiny pebbles in the clay give it additional surface texture.

The lugs on an Iga ware vase are called "ears" (耳付, mimitsuki). Vases tend to be made out of rough clay, sometimes with tiny white stones added. In the past these were kneaded by hand, which gave it a distorted form and thus character, but later production by wheel also developed. The ear lugs at the end of the production are what define the quality of a vase. They are shaped and formed to balance the vessel; they express the strength and energy of the piece.

Iga ware does not use applied glaze. Instead it is fired at a very high temperature in a kiln causing it to crystallize in a reddish hue, often with brown-grey scorch marks caused by log ashes called koge, and a translucent green ash glaze from the burning wood forms. This occurs when firewood ash melts at 1400 Celsius. Since they are free of impurities, a clear jade translucent feldspathic glass called biidoro, after the Portuguese word for glass vidro, results. Sometimes the biidoro glass coagulates to form a globule called a "dragonfly eye." The clay's durability means it can be fired multiple times without cracking, sometimes up to three times. The ash glaze builds up in layers and produces a translucence. It does not form in modern gas-fired kilns.

Modern artists like Tsuneoka Mitsuoki (恒岡光興) (b. 1939) have developed a glaze that produces the same colours as the natural jade green ash wood glaze when fired in a gas kiln. This is sprayed on the pottery to make a base coat, and then poured with more glaze in layers. The thicker the coat is the darker green the glaze that will result.

Iga pots have a high level of functionality for everyday use. A donabe pot has high heat capacity retention due to the quality of the clay and the thick walls.
