= Instant-boiled mutton =

Hot pot dish from Beijing, China

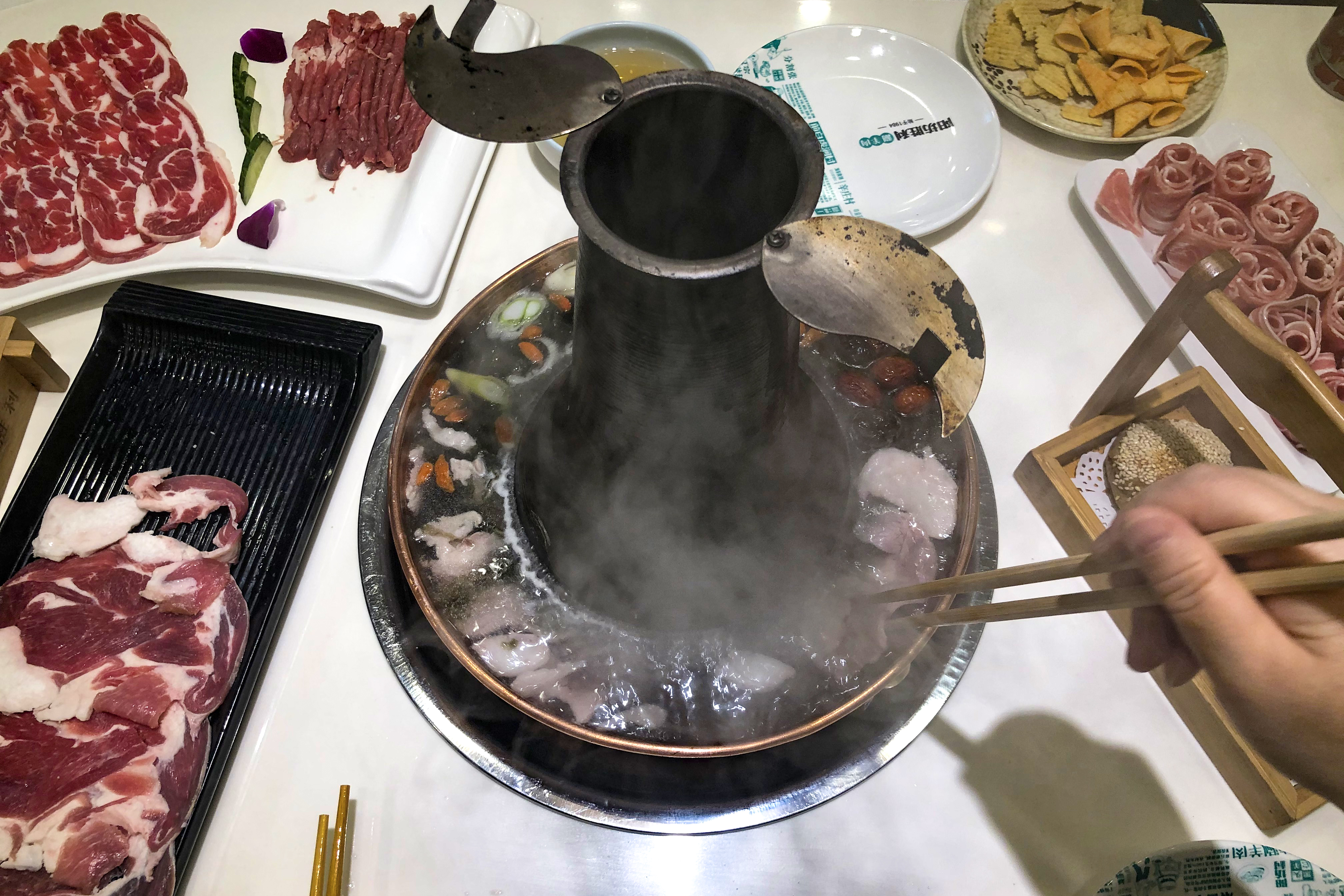
Dipping sliced mutton into a hot pot in Yangfang, Beijing

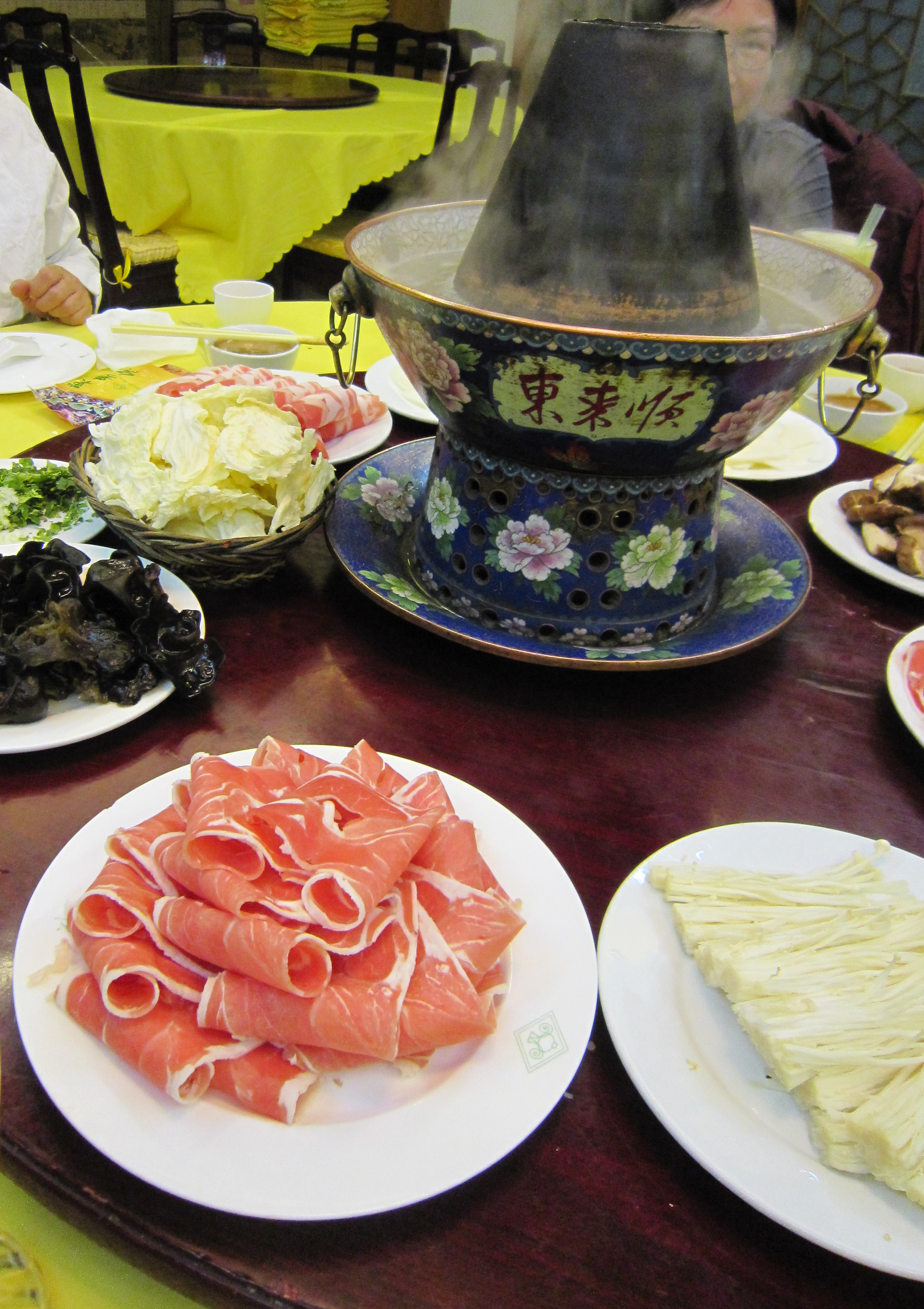
Instant-boiled mutton being served in Donglaishun, Wangfujing main branch, Beijing

Instant-boiled mutton (Chinese: 涮羊肉; pinyin: shuàn yángròu, also known or shuanyangrou, or dip-boil mutton) is a Chinese hot pot dish popular in Beijing cuisine. Traditionally, Chinese people have eaten it inside the home during cold winter weather, but in recent times, instant-boiled mutton has been eaten year-round. It is also served in restaurants.

Mutton slice often uses different cuts from the back (e.g. shangnao, sancha, etc.) and rear legs (e.g. modang). The tail of the lamb is used to prepare the soup base.

== History ==
While a popular legend attributes the dish to the Yuan Dynasty, the story has little historical backing and the practice of eating thinly sliced meat cooked quickly in boiling broth in a style resembling today's hot pot was already established before then. The story claims that at one point during a battle, Kublai Khan had a sudden craving for stewed mutton. However, the enemy's troops were approaching. To satisfy Kublai Khan's desire, a chef quickly cut off a dozen thin mutton slices and put them in boiling water. He removed them as soon as the lamb changed color and put them into a bowl with salt. Kublai Khan finished the mutton quickly and returned to the battle, which he won. At the victory banquet, Kublai Khan requested that the chef make this lamb dish again and named it shuanyangrou (涮羊肉) or instant-boiled mutton.

A notable early account comes from the Song dynasty book Shan Jia Qinggong (山家清供) by scholar Lin Hong, who described a similar cooking method both made by himself in his hometown Quanzhou and also at a banquet in present-day Hangzhou. Inspired by the sight of the meat swirling in the bubbling broth, which he likened to "waves surging over snowy rivers and winds turning evening clouds", Lin composed a poem and named the dish Bo Xia Gong (拨霞供). Lin explicitly noted that "mutton can also be used."

However, it was only during the Qing Dynasty when multiple written records exist of a dish named shuanyangrou as a popular dish in Beijing. The dish shabu-shabu was inspired by this dish in 1952, but without mutton as the Japanese favored beef.

== Cooking and eating method ==
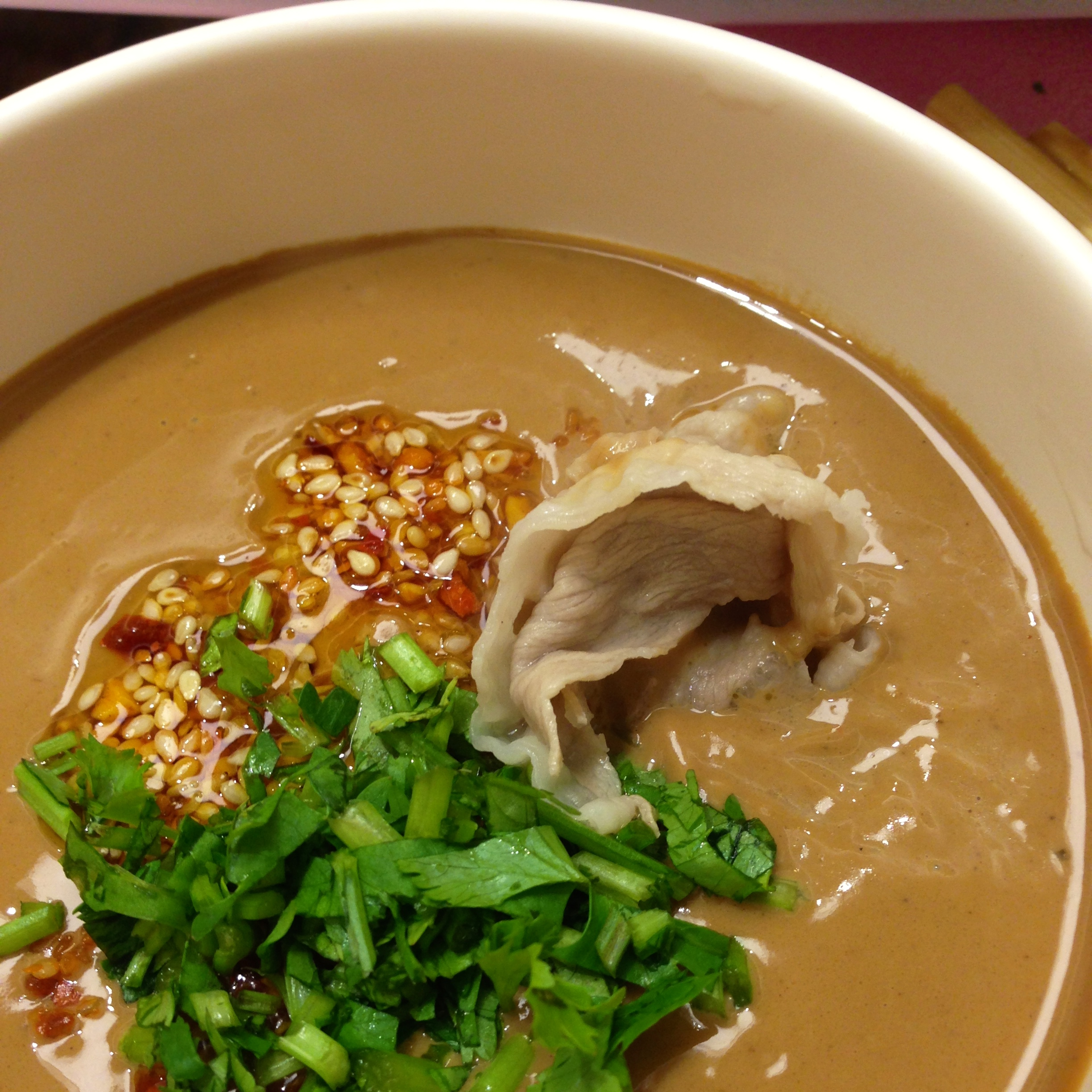
Freshly cooked mutton slice in a sesame sauce dip

Unlike Chengdu or Sichuan hot-pot, Beijing-styled mutton hot-pot is cooked with a tongguo, a bronze donut-shaped pot, in a boiling clear broth. Tofu, Chinese cabbage, bean sprouts, and vermicelli are normally included in the hot-pot. Lamb is pre-sliced paper-thin into unbroken pieces and served on the table. Eaters pick up some pre-sliced raw lamb using chopsticks, put it in the boiling hot-pot, and remove it as soon as the lamb changes color. Each person has a small bowl to hold sauce for the cooked lamb; the sauce is normally a mixture of sesame sauce, chili oil, leeks, and more.

== See also ==
- Shabu-shabu
- List of lamb dishes
