= Donglaishun =

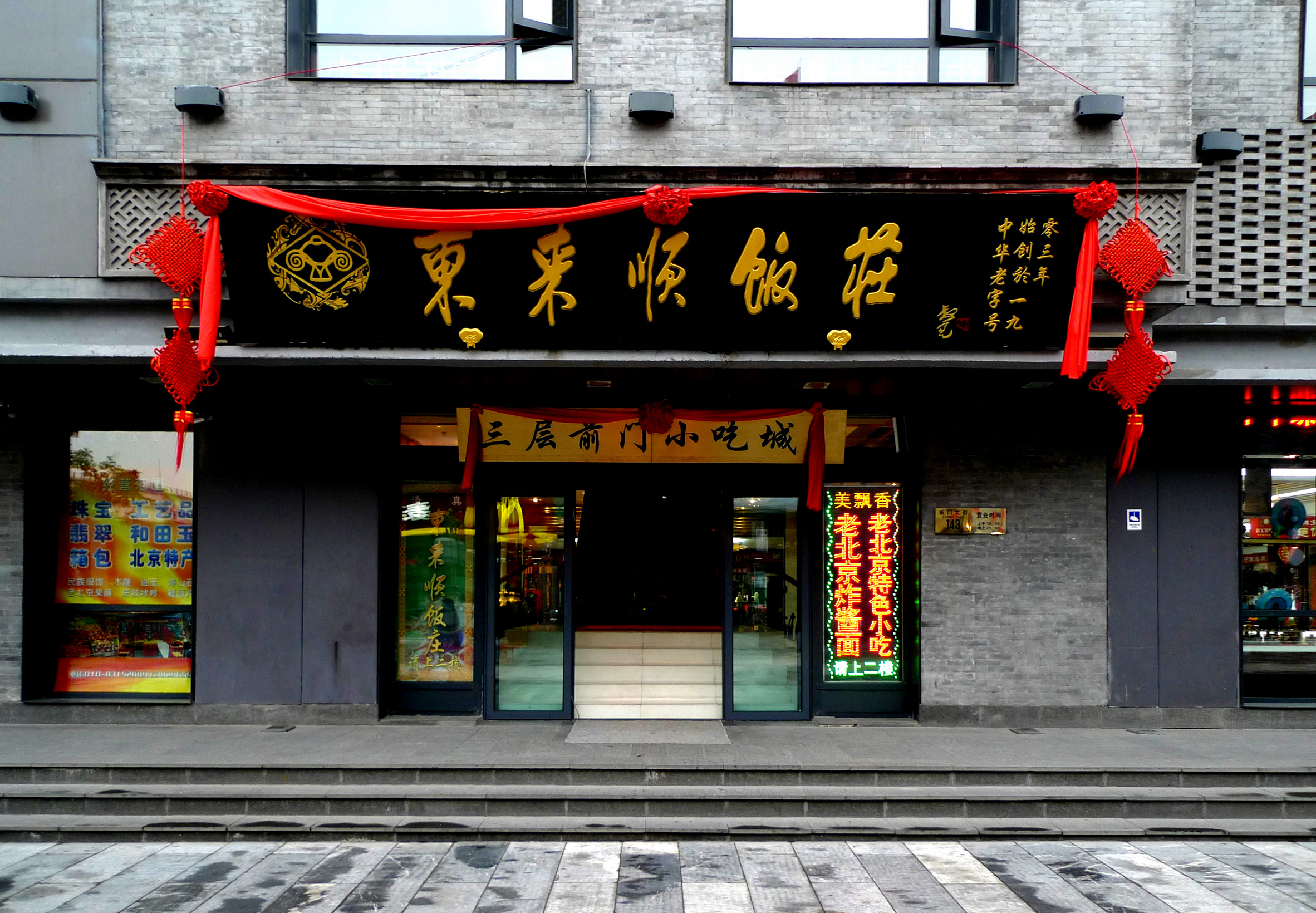
A branch of Donglaishun Restaurant located on Qianmen Street, Dongcheng District, Beijing

Donglaishun Restaurant (东来顺饭庄) is a Time-honored Brand founded in Beijing, China, in 1903, specializing in Chinese Islamic cuisine.

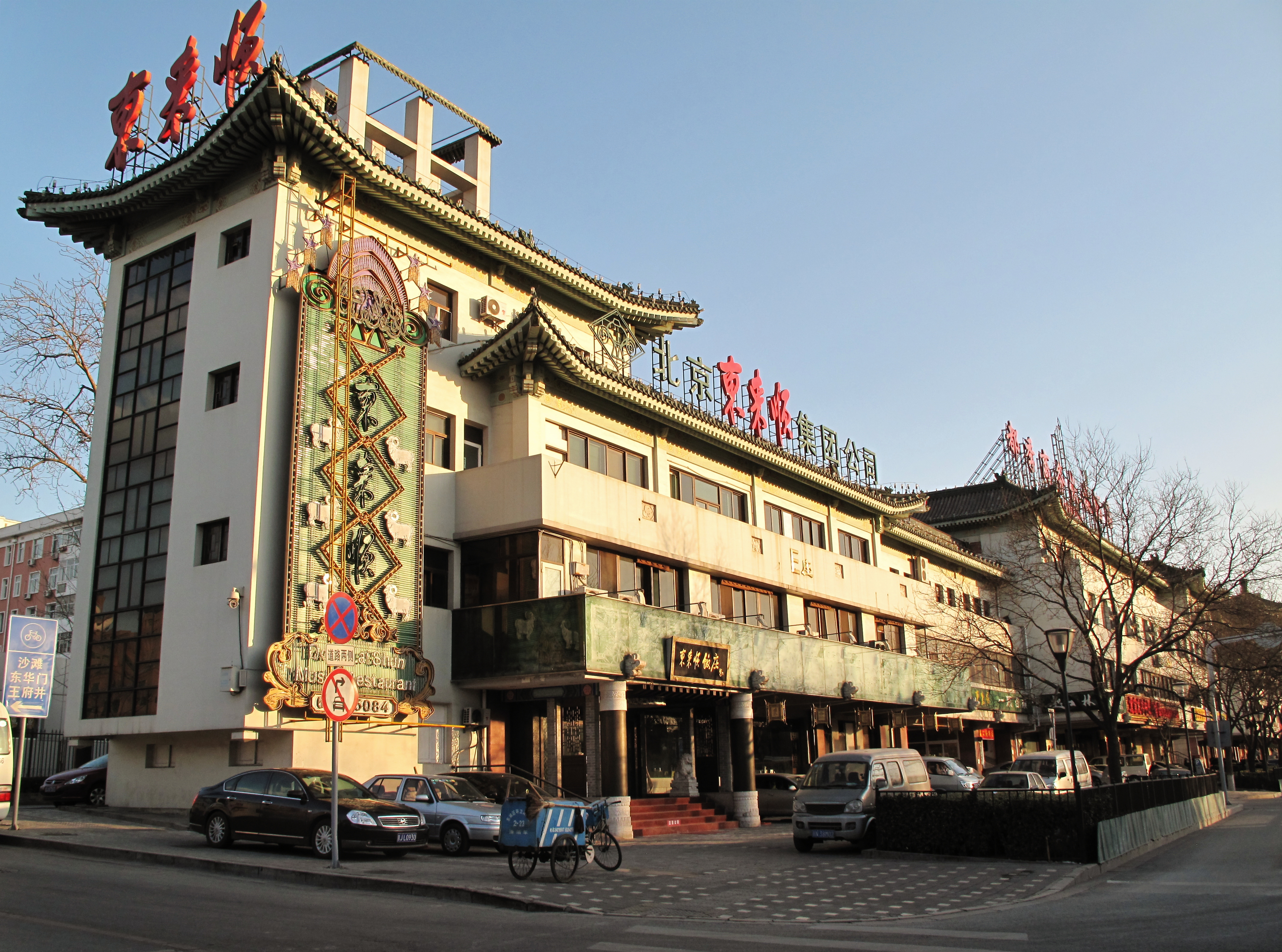
Another branch located on Nanheyan Street, Dongcheng District, Beijing

== History ==
The predecessor of Donglaishun was a porridge stall run by Ding Deshan, a native Cangzhou, in Dong'an Market during the Qing period.

In 1912, a fire broke out in Dong'an Market, and the porridge stall was destroyed. Eunuch Wei Yan stepped in and financially supported Ding Deshan to rebuild three tiled houses, which he then named "Donglaishun Mutton Restaurant" (东来顺羊肉馆). Initially, they only served mutton soup and offal, but introduced their signature dish, instant-boiled mutton (涮羊肉), as the restaurant received increasing popularity among diners in the later years.

As one of the best known Halal restaurants in Beijing, Donglaishun was officially recognized by the Ministry of Commerce of the People's Republic of China as a Time-honored Brand in 2006.

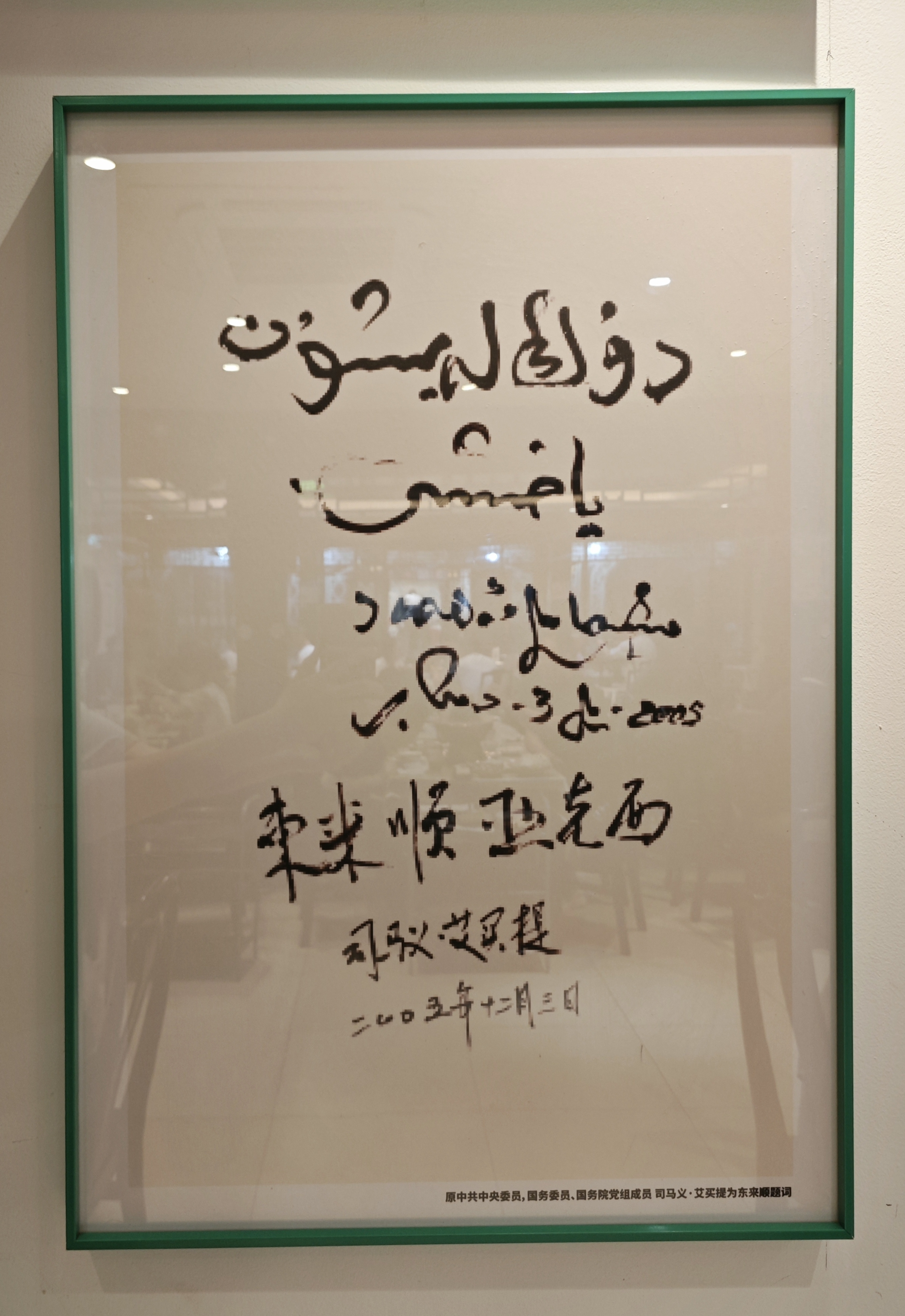
A "Yaxsi" (Uyghur: very good) comment left by Isma'il Ehmet
