= Hand drill (hieroglyph) =

Egyptian hieroglyph

U25 U24
Hand drill
in hieroglyphs

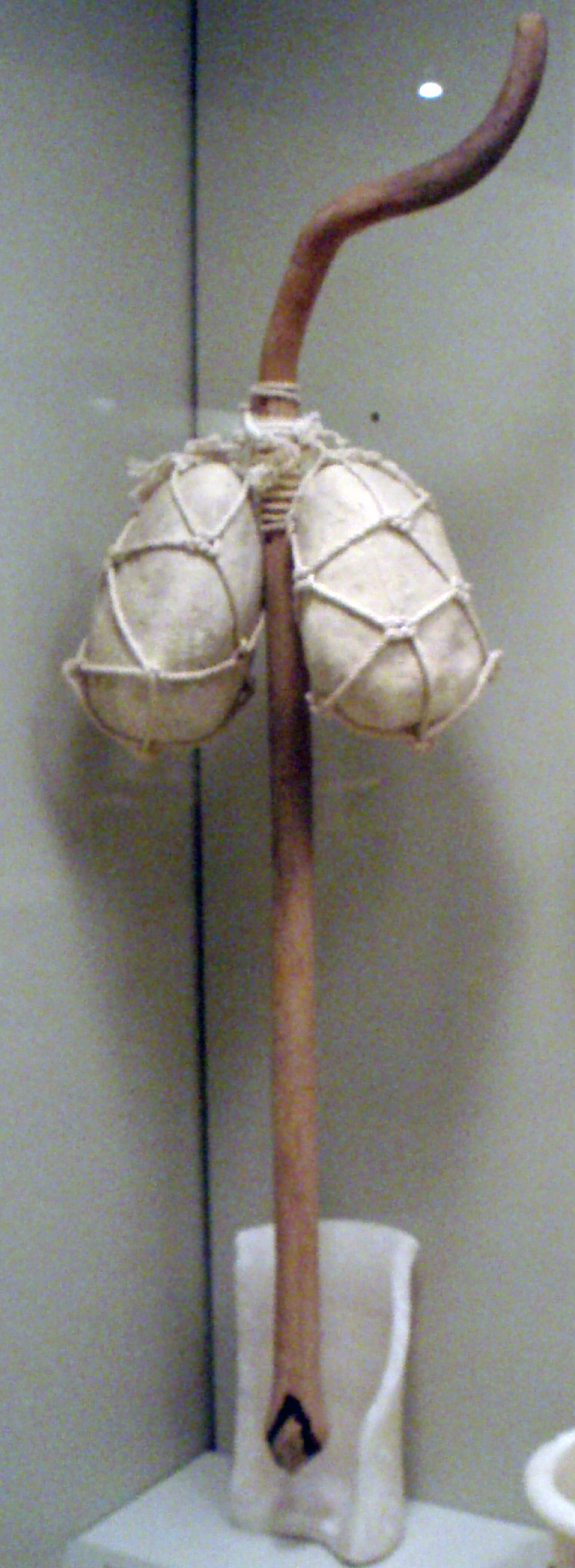
Hand drill-(reconstructed).

The Hand drill is a hieroglyph, (and tool), used in ancient Egypt from the earliest dynasties. As a hieroglyph, it can also be used as a determinative for words related to the profession of vase, bowl, pot-making, etc., typically from fine-grained, colorful rare stone, for example unguent jars. The size of drills was small-to-large, small for small unguent jars, and large for more massive, grain-storing pottery. The original jars found in tombs were more often used for ceremonial usages, presumably the reason they are found as grave goods or tomb offerings.

== Hand drill hieroglyph and tool explanation ==
The hand drill was a vertical type of weighted, and counterbalanced boring bar, (used today in horizontal lathe-work boring, for example: rifle tubes). The hieroglyph shows the weights used as pictured on temple reliefs; the weight of the stones does the tool work, and the artisan simply supplies the rotational motion of the tool, for boring the hole.

Of note: with the weighted device, the Egyptians were performing a lathe operation long before the invention. Instead of the lathe-(massive metal: weight and forces) doing the work, essentially the Egyptians were using a form of a vertical lathe-using gravity-weights, with the boring bar doing the cutting.

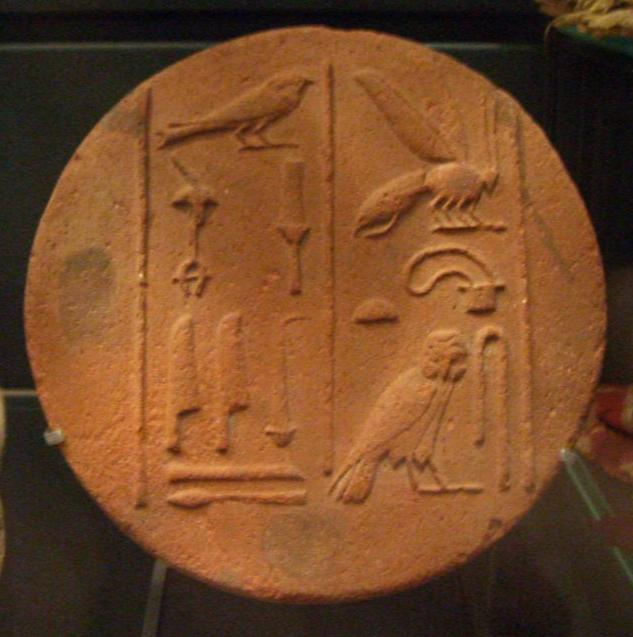
Base of Ancient Egypt type Old Kingdom funerary cone,
in finest condition.
Raised Bas relief, archaic-type hieroglyphs,
between vertical registers.

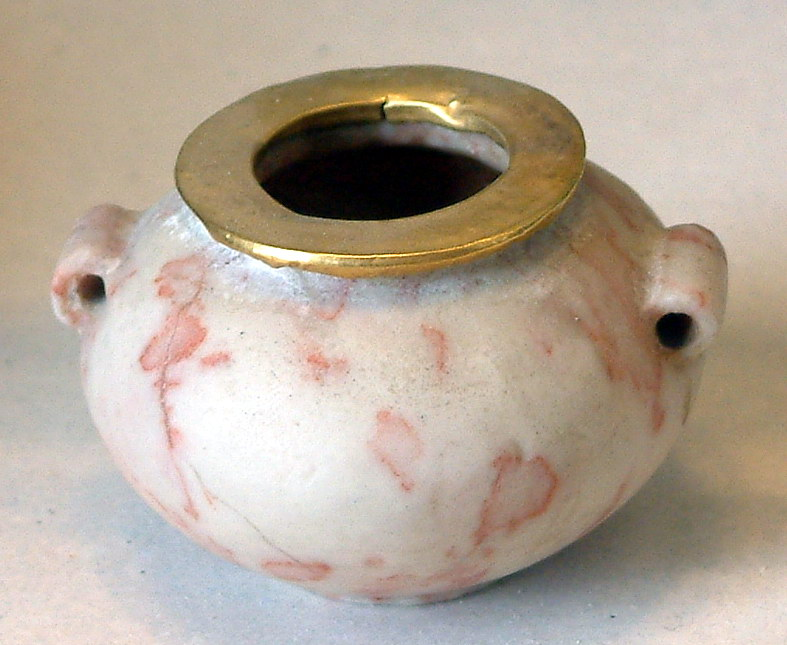
Small, drilled stone vase, with 2-lugs for suspension, Fourth to Third millennium BC

== See also ==
- Gardiner's Sign List#U. Agriculture, Crafts, and Professions
- List of Egyptian hieroglyphs
