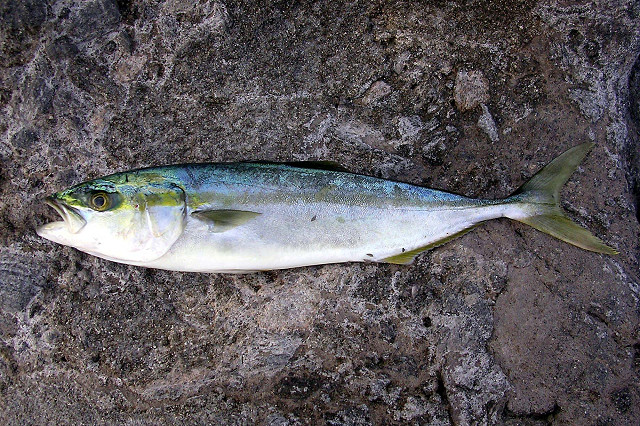

Conservation status
- Least Concern (IUCN 3.1)

Scientific classification
- Kingdom: Animalia
- Phylum: Chordata
- Class: Actinopterygii
- Division: Teleostei
- Order: Carangiformes
- Suborder: Carangoidei
- Family: Carangidae
- Genus: Seriola
- Species: S. quinqueradiata

Binomial name
- Seriola quinqueradiata Temminck & Schlegel, 1845

Synonyms
- Seriola sparta Jenkins, 1903

= Japanese amberjack =

Species of fish

Global aquaculture production of Japanese amberjack (Seriola quinqueradiata) in thousand tonnes from 1950 to 2022, as reported by the FAO

The Japanese amberjack or yellowtail, Seriola quinqueradiata, is a species of jack fish in the family Carangidae, native to the northwest Pacific Ocean. It is known as shiyu (鰤魚) in China, bang'eo (방어) in Korea, and buri (鰤) or hamachi (魬) in Japan.

Although it is frequently listed on menus as "yellowtail tuna", it is a fish of an entirely different family, the Carangidae, rather than the family Scombridae that includes tunas, mackerels, and bonitos.

== Description ==
Japanese amberjack usually grows to around 1 meter in length, though some can reach 1.5 meters. They have a characteristic yellow band that runs horizontally along the length of the body, as well as a yellow tail, hence their name.

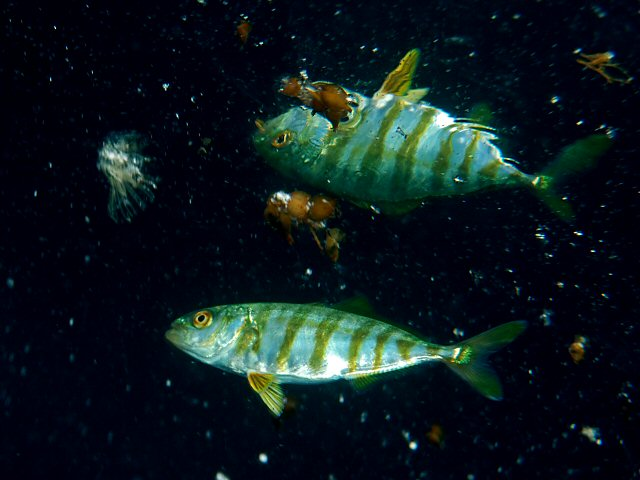
Juvenile Japanese amberjack

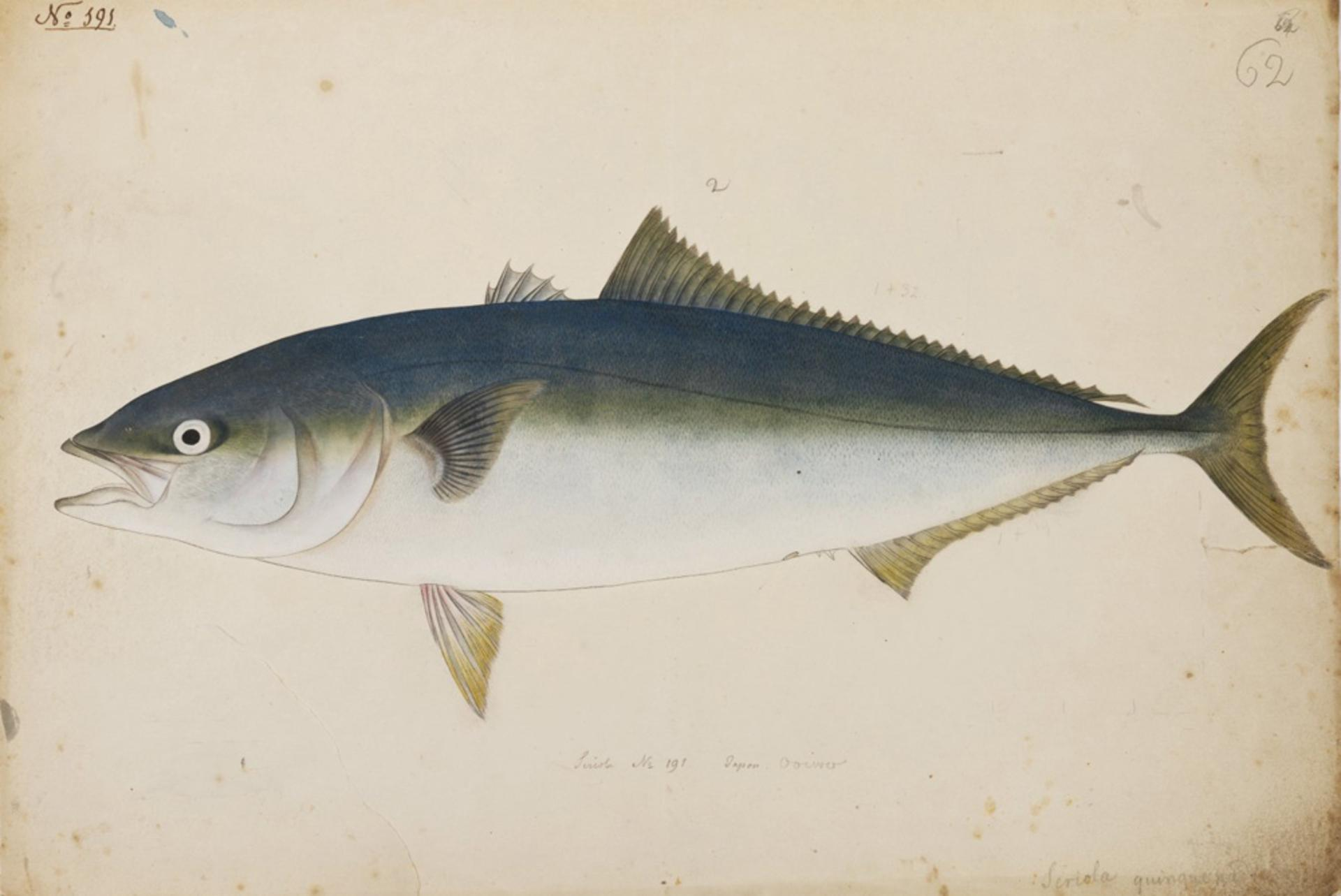
Japanese amberjack, painting by Kawahara Keiga (川原慶賀), 1823–1829

== As food ==
The fish is highly appreciated in Japan, where it is called hamachi or buri. They are eaten either cooked or raw and are a seasonal favourite in the colder months when the meat has a higher fat content. Amberjack is typically thought of as a winter delicacy of Toyama and the Hokuriku region.

Some of the fish consumed are caught wild, but a substantial amount is farmed (about 120,000 tonnes per year). To populate the pens, every May, workers fish for the small wild fry (called mojako), which can be found under floating seaweed. They scoop out the seaweed together with the mojako and put the mojako in cages in the sea.

The small fry grow until they reach 10 to 50 grams in mass; the fry are called inada in eastern Japan (Kantō). They are then sold to aquaculturists, who grow them until they reach 3 kilograms (youth, called hamachi) or 5 kilograms (adult, called buri).

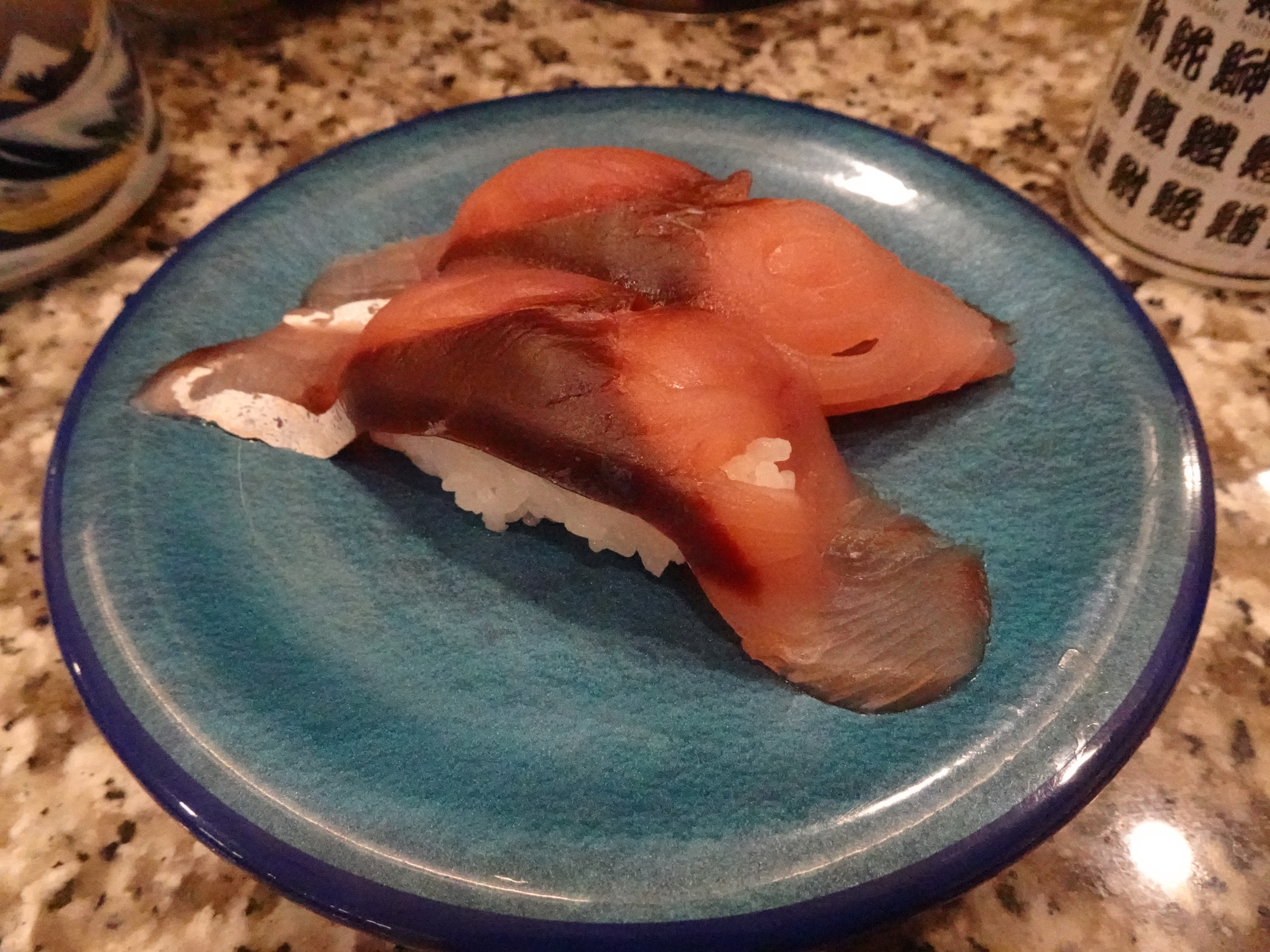
Nigirizushi with raw amberjack

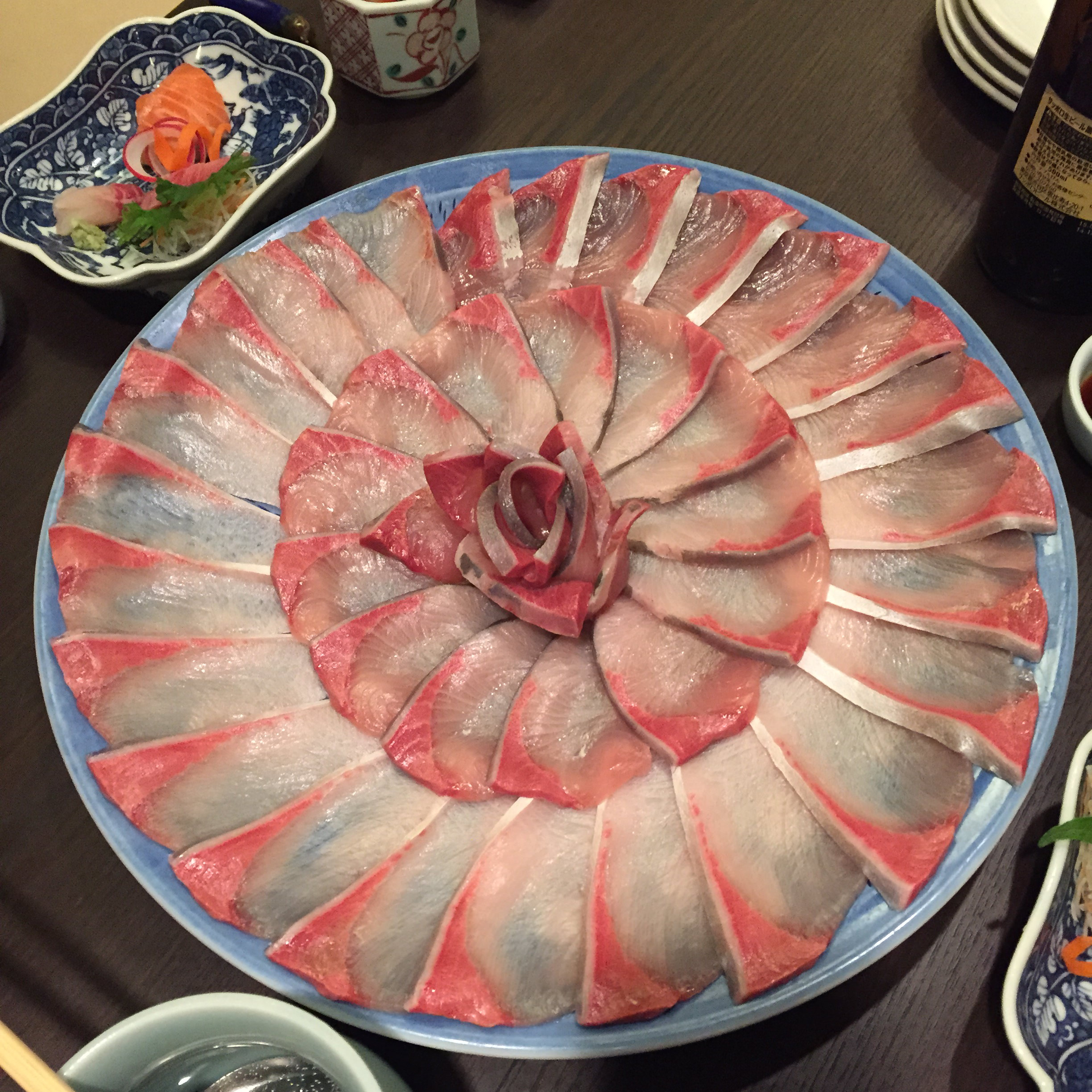
Plate of amberjack shabu-shabu

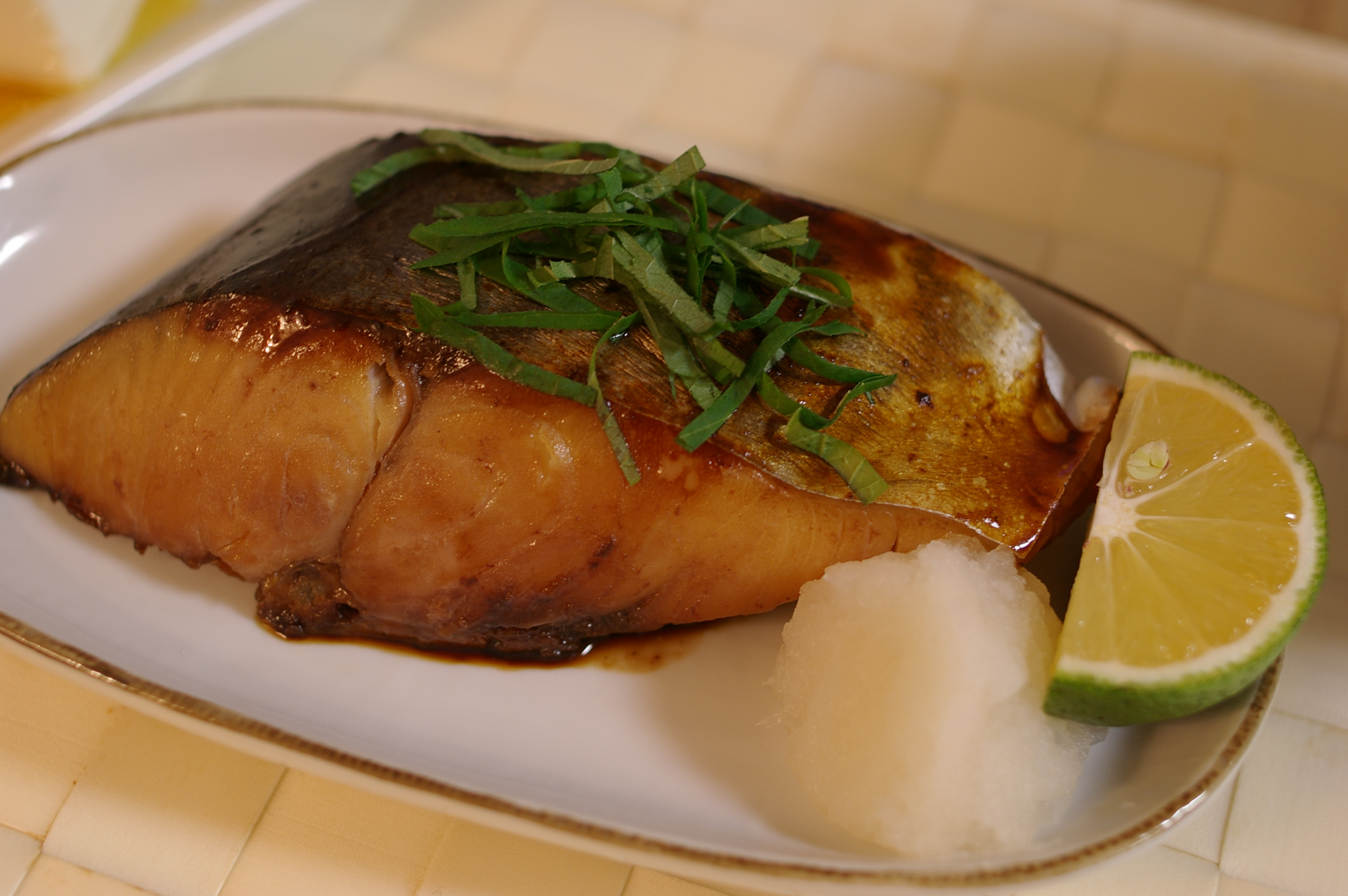
Teriyaki amberjack

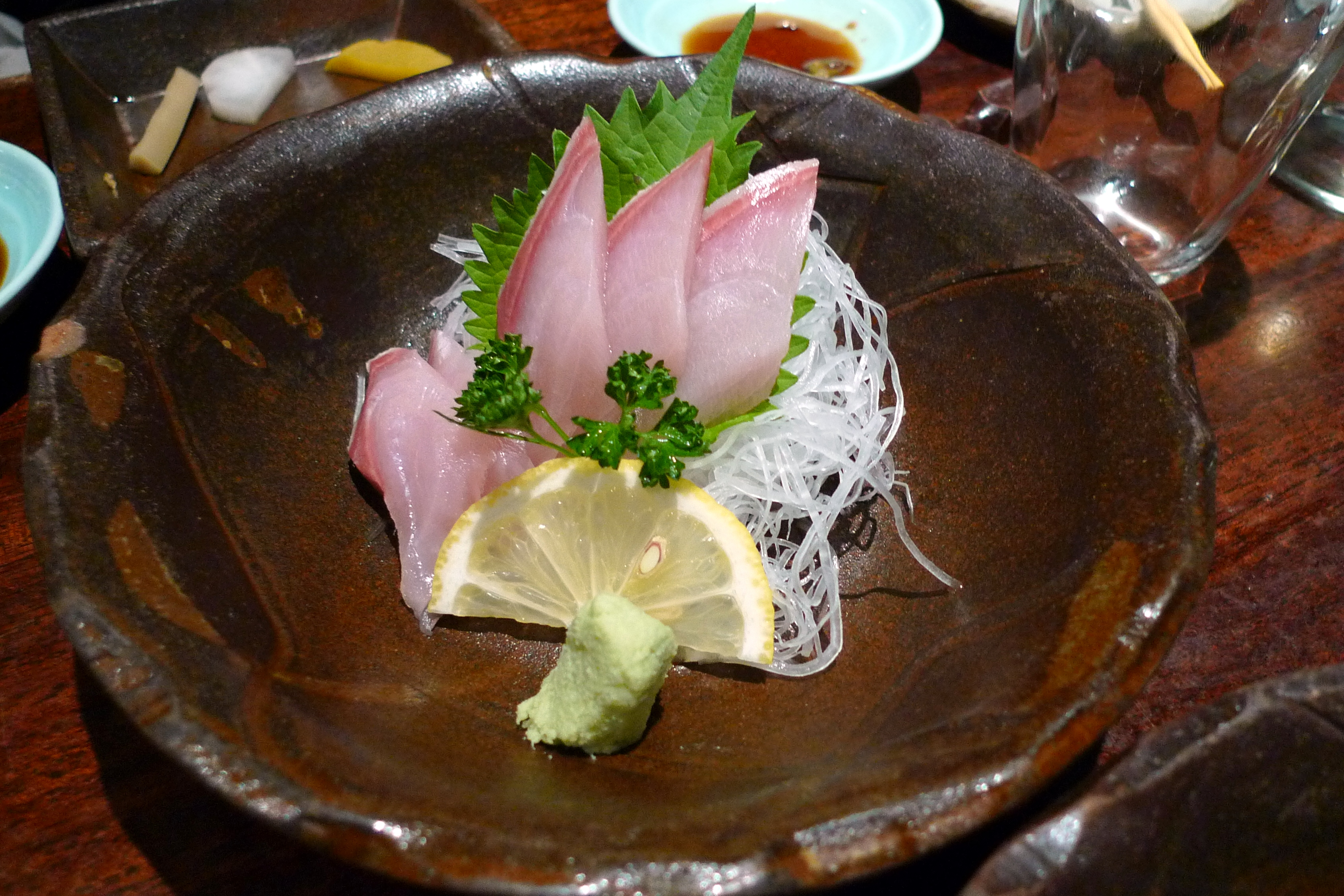
Amberjack sashimi

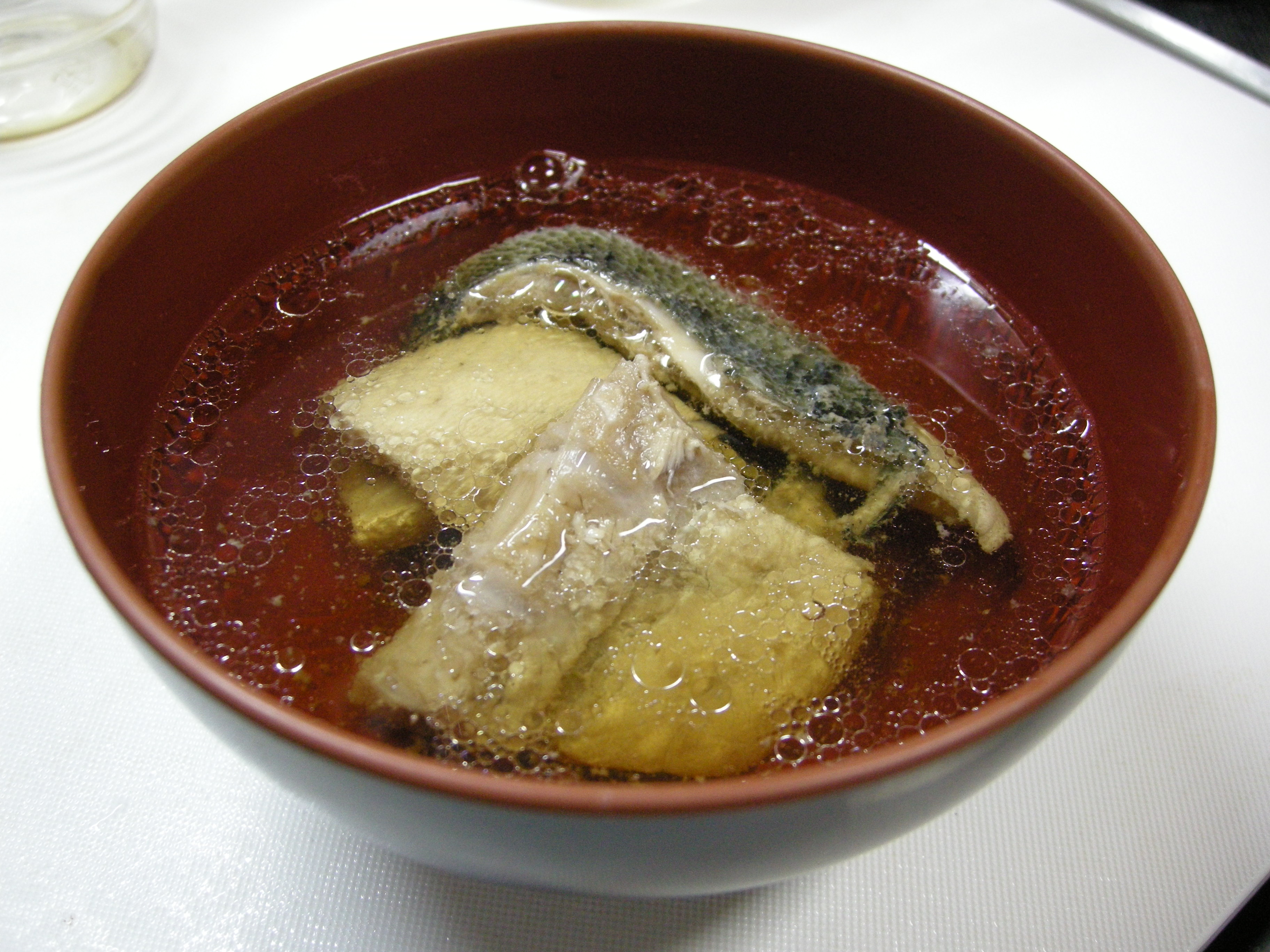
Suimono (clear soup) with amberjack

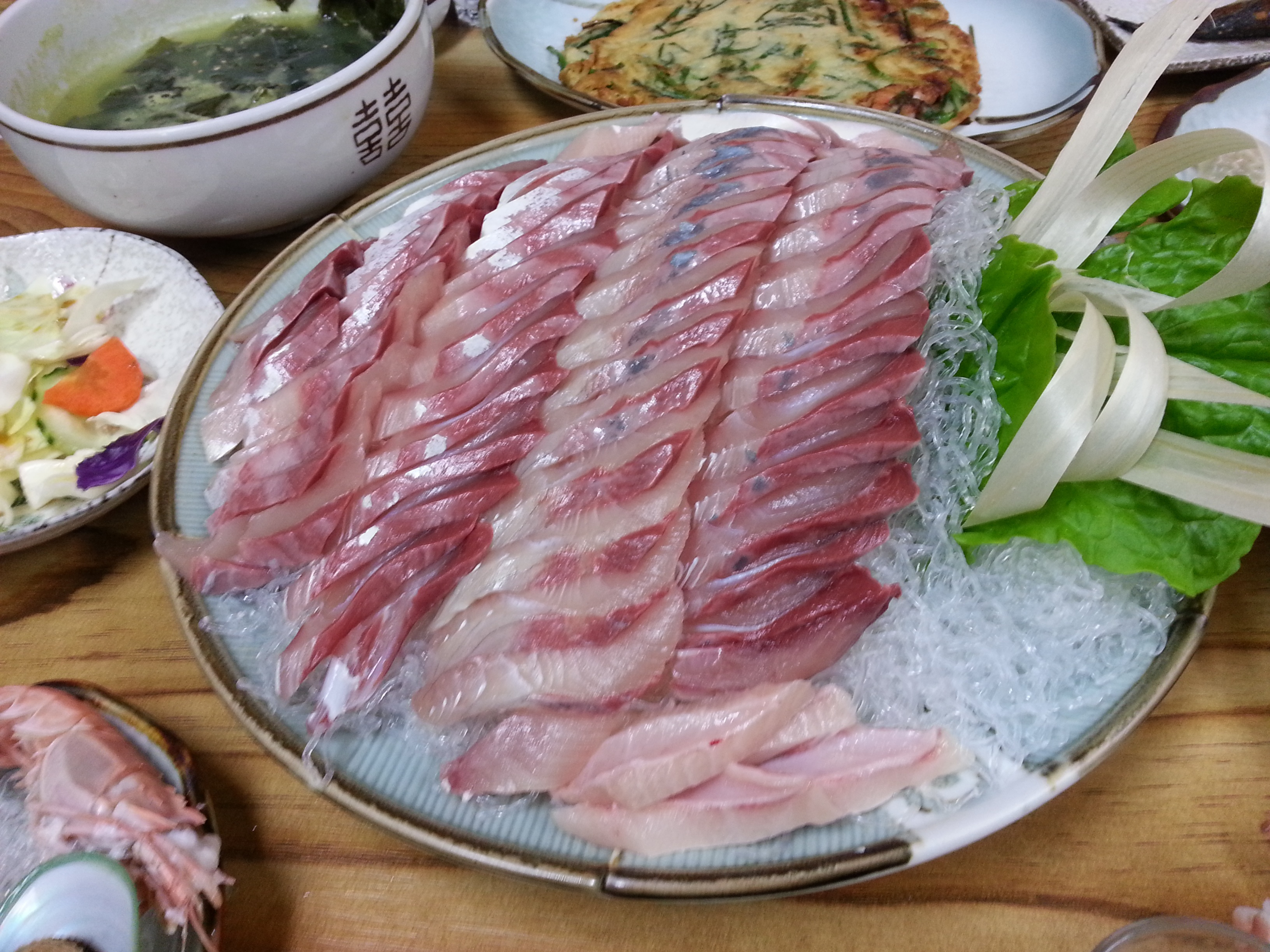
Korean bangeo-hoe, or raw amberjack
