= Lug (knob) =

Protuberance, handle or extrusion on the side of a container

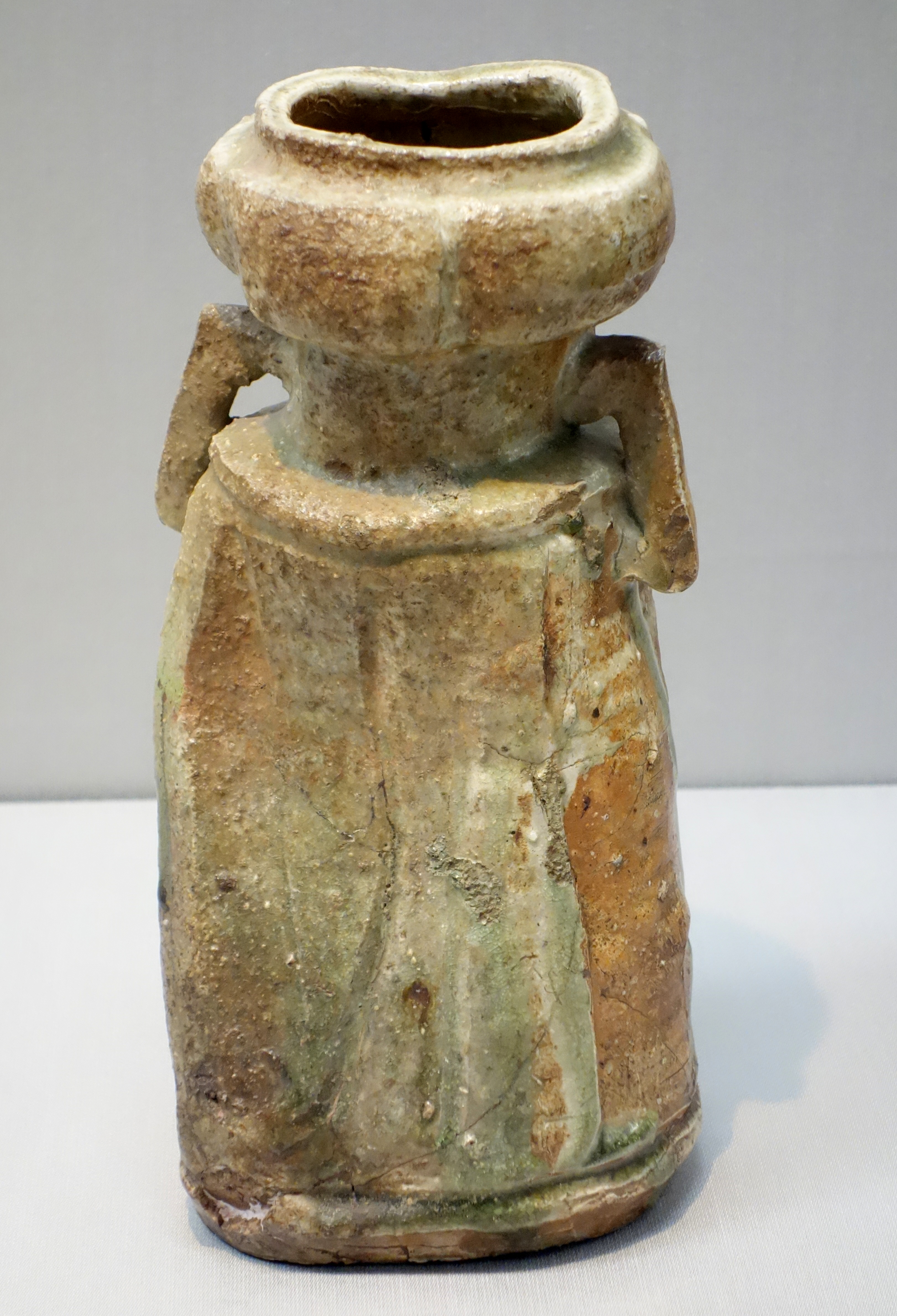
Iga ware flower vase with "ear" lugs, 17th century, Edo period

A lug is a typically flattened protuberance, a handle or extrusion located on the side of a ceramics, jug, glass, vase, or other container. They are sometimes found on prehistoric ceramics and stone containers, such as on pots from ancient Egypt, Hembury ware, claw beakers, and boar spears.

A lug may also only be shaped as a lip for suspension–(no hole). In Ancient Egypt, lugs contained a hole for suspension, with 2– or 3–lugged vessels most common.

In Roman times, lugs were on some types of column-sections to aid in construction. After slung by rope into position with a crane, the lugs were then masoned off.

In Japan, Iga ware vases with lugs on each side are called "ears" and are an important feature.

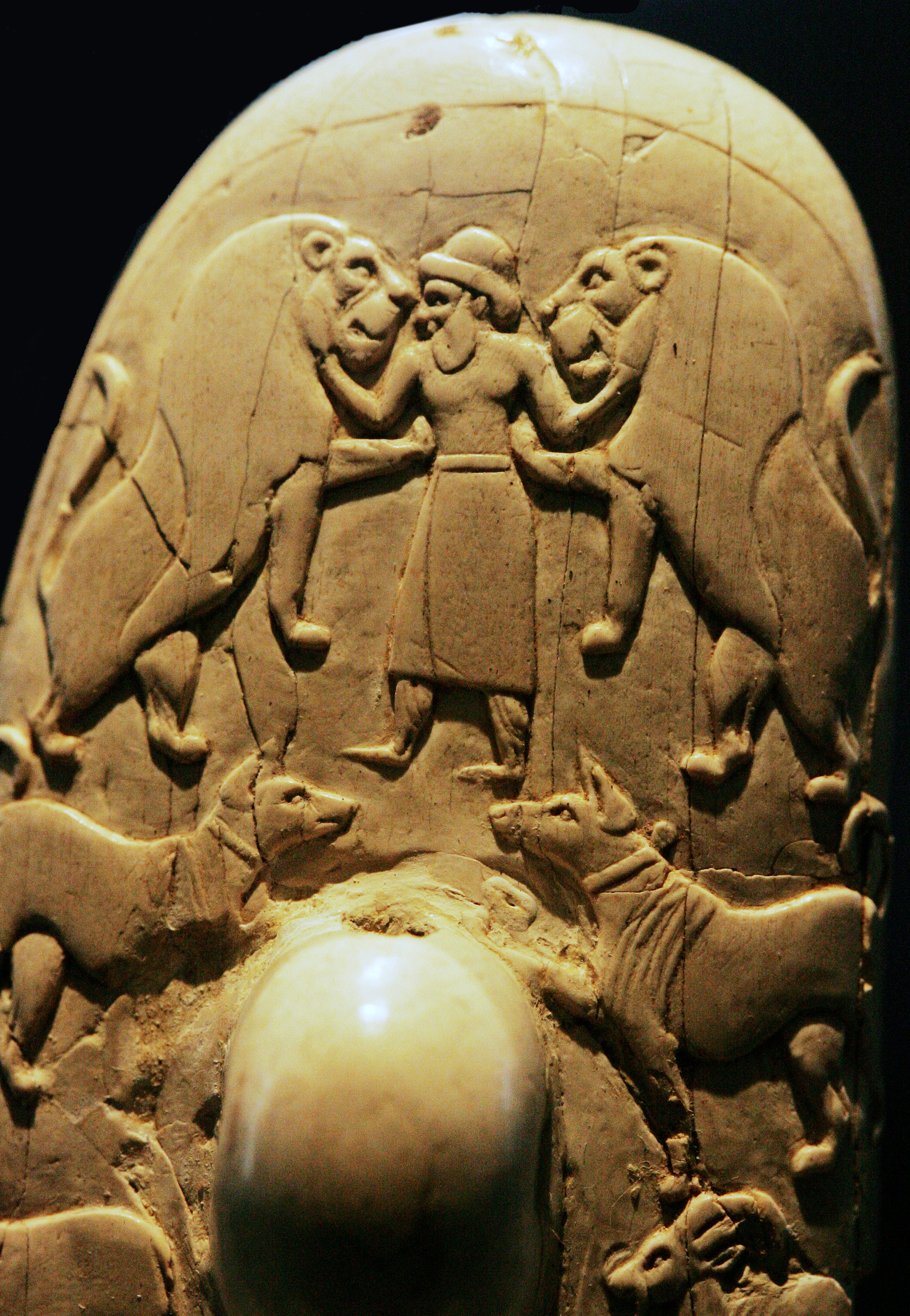
Single suspension lug (knob), vertical hole, of the Gebel el-Arak Knife

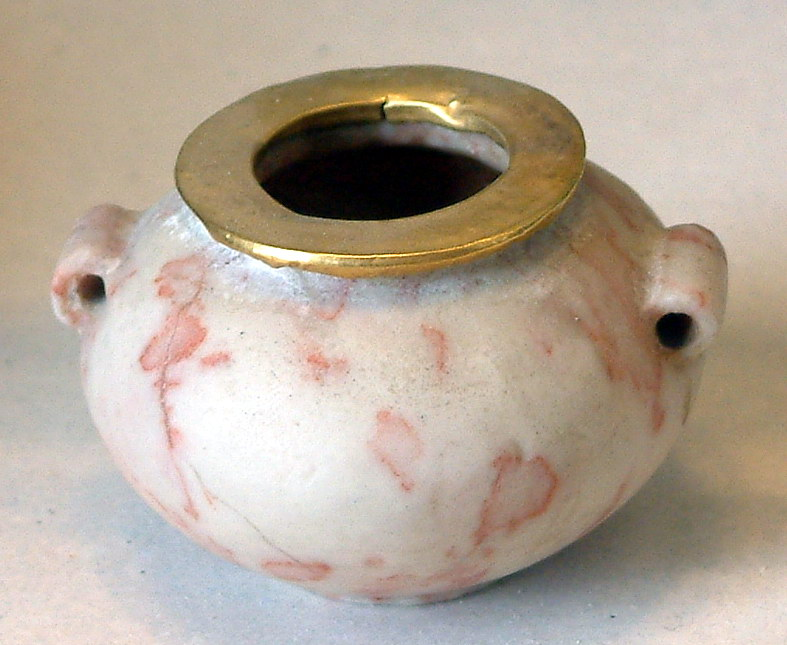
Ancient Egyptian lugged and drilled pot of marble stone (3rd millennium BCE)

== See also ==
- Package handle
