= Shabu-shabu =

Japanese hotpot dish

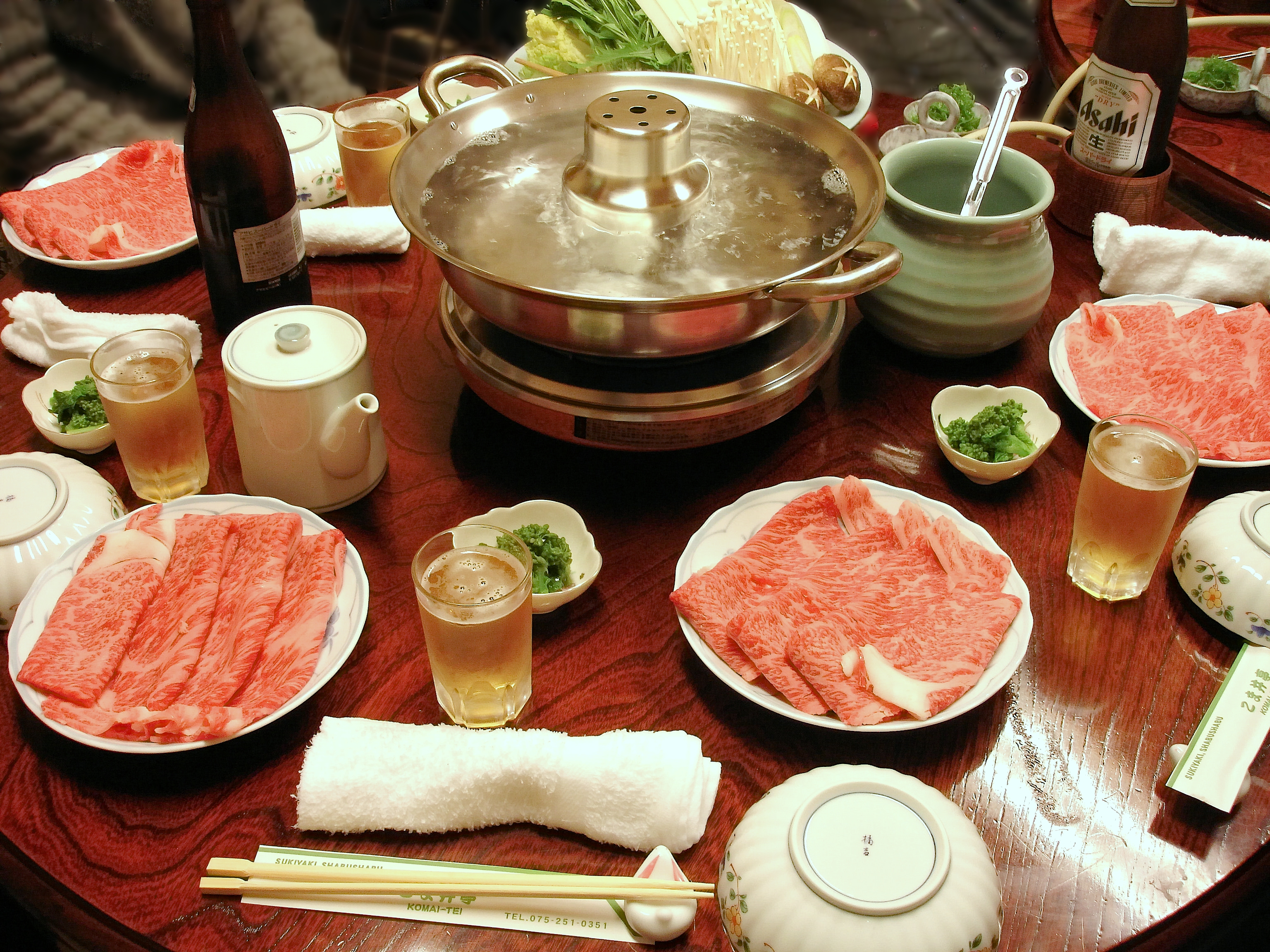
- Type: Hot pot
- Place of origin: Japan
- Region or state: Osaka
- Main ingredients: Meat, vegetables, tofu
- Variations: Shuan yangrou

Shabu-shabu (Japanese: しゃぶしゃぶ, romanized: shabushabu) is a Japanese nabemono hotpot dish of thinly sliced meat and vegetables boiled in water and served with dipping sauces. The term is onomatopoeic, derived from the sound – "swish swish" – emitted when the ingredients are stirred in the cooking pot. The food is cooked piece by piece by the diner at the table. Shabu-shabu is generally more savory and less sweet than sukiyaki, another hot pot dish.

== History ==
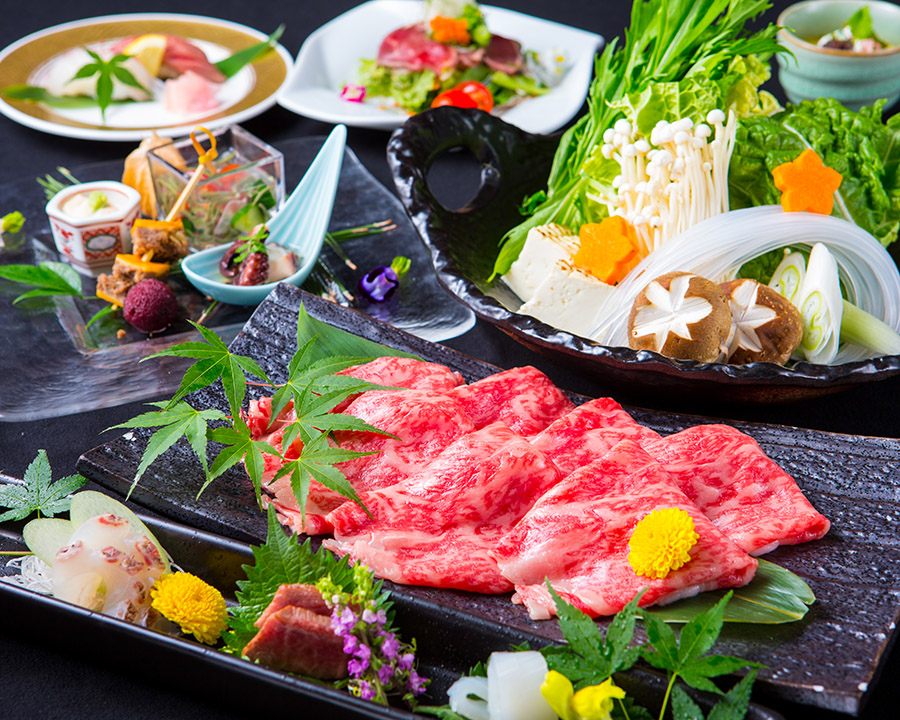
Thinly sliced meat and vegetables are typical shabu-shabu ingredients

Shabu-shabu was invented in Japan in the 20th century with the opening of the restaurant Suehiro in Osaka, where the name was also invented. The president of the restaurant, Chūichi Miyake, registered the name as a trademark in 1952. Shabu-shabu became more and more popular in the Kansai region and in 1955 it was also added to the menu of restaurants in Tokyo and then spread throughout Japan.

There are two common theories about the origin of shabu-shabu. The first is that it comes from the Inner Mongolian hot pot known as instant-boiled mutton (shuàn yángròu), which was introduced to Japan after World War II by Japanese who had lived in Beijing. Both dishes are prepared by briefly swirling thin slices of meat in boiling broth, then eaten with sauce.

The other theory is that shabu-shabu originates from Japanese mizutaki hot pot, which is a popular type of nabemono. Mizutaki has various ingredients and versions but is always based on dashi or water without additional flavourings.

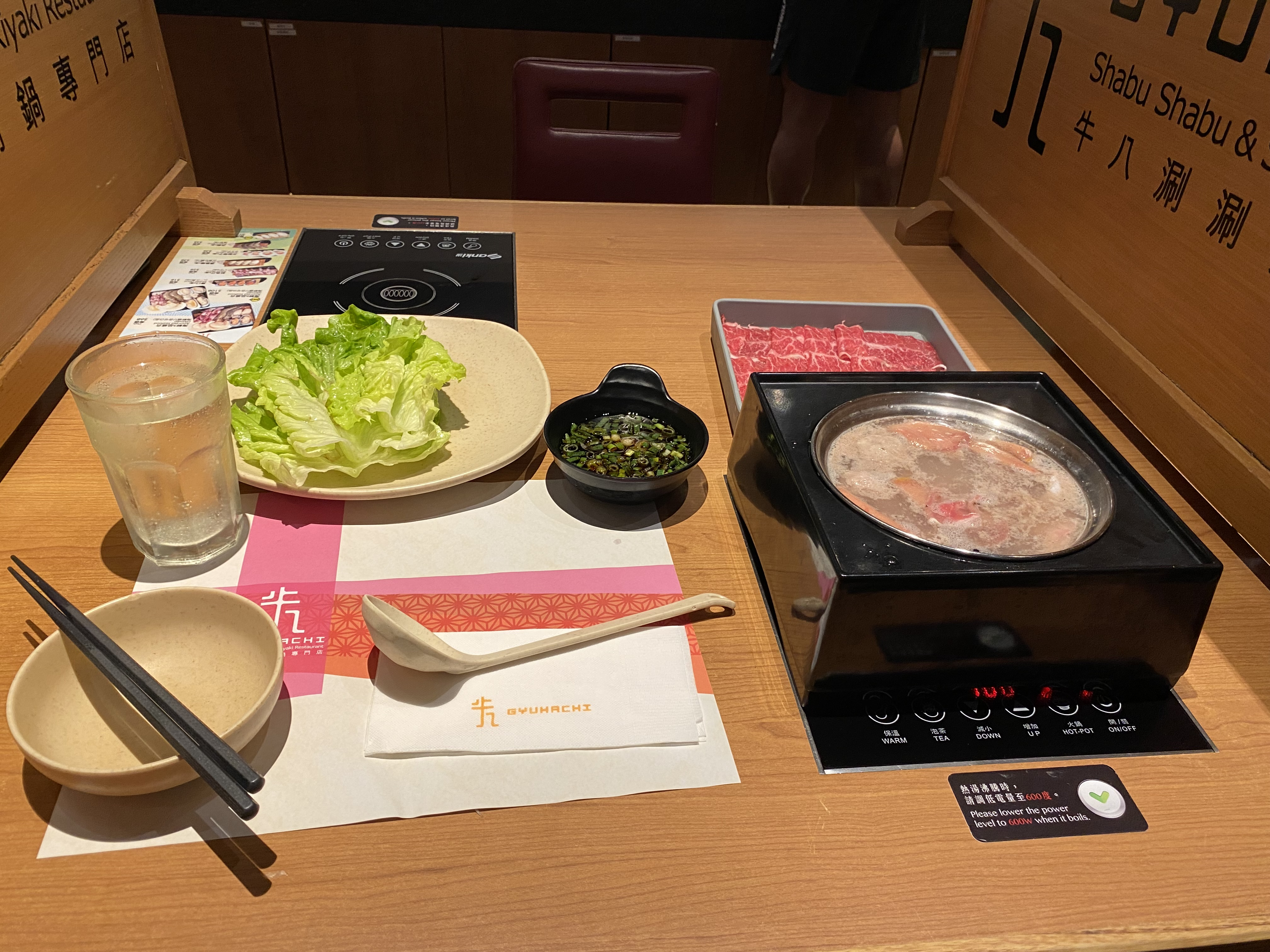
Private shabu-shabu restaurant in Tsim Sha Tsui, Hong Kong

Compared with other Japanese hot-pot dishes such as sukiyaki, shabu-shabu is infrequently cooked at home in Japan. However, sukiyaki and shabu-shabu are both popular in many parts of Japan, and also in Japantowns in countries such as the United States and Canada. It is also popular in Taiwan and South Korea.

== Preparation ==
The dish is usually made with thinly sliced beef, but some versions use pork, crab, chicken, lamb, duck, or lobster. Most often, ribeye steak is used, but less tender cuts, such as top sirloin, are also common. A more expensive breed of cattle, such as Wagyu, may also be used. It is usually served with tofu and vegetables, including Chinese cabbage, chrysanthemum leaves, nori (edible seaweed), onions, carrots, and shiitake and enokitake mushrooms. In some places, udon, mochi, or harusame noodles may also be served.

The dish is prepared by submerging a thin slice of meat or a piece of vegetable in a pot of boiling water or dashi (broth) made with konbu (kelp) and stirring it. Normally, the raw meat is dipped into the hot stock for just a few seconds, as the pieces are sliced paper thin so they will cook quickly. Putting all meat into the pot at one time may result in overcooking the meat. Cooked meat and vegetables are usually dipped in ponzu or goma (sesame seed) sauce before eating, and served with a bowl of steamed white rice.

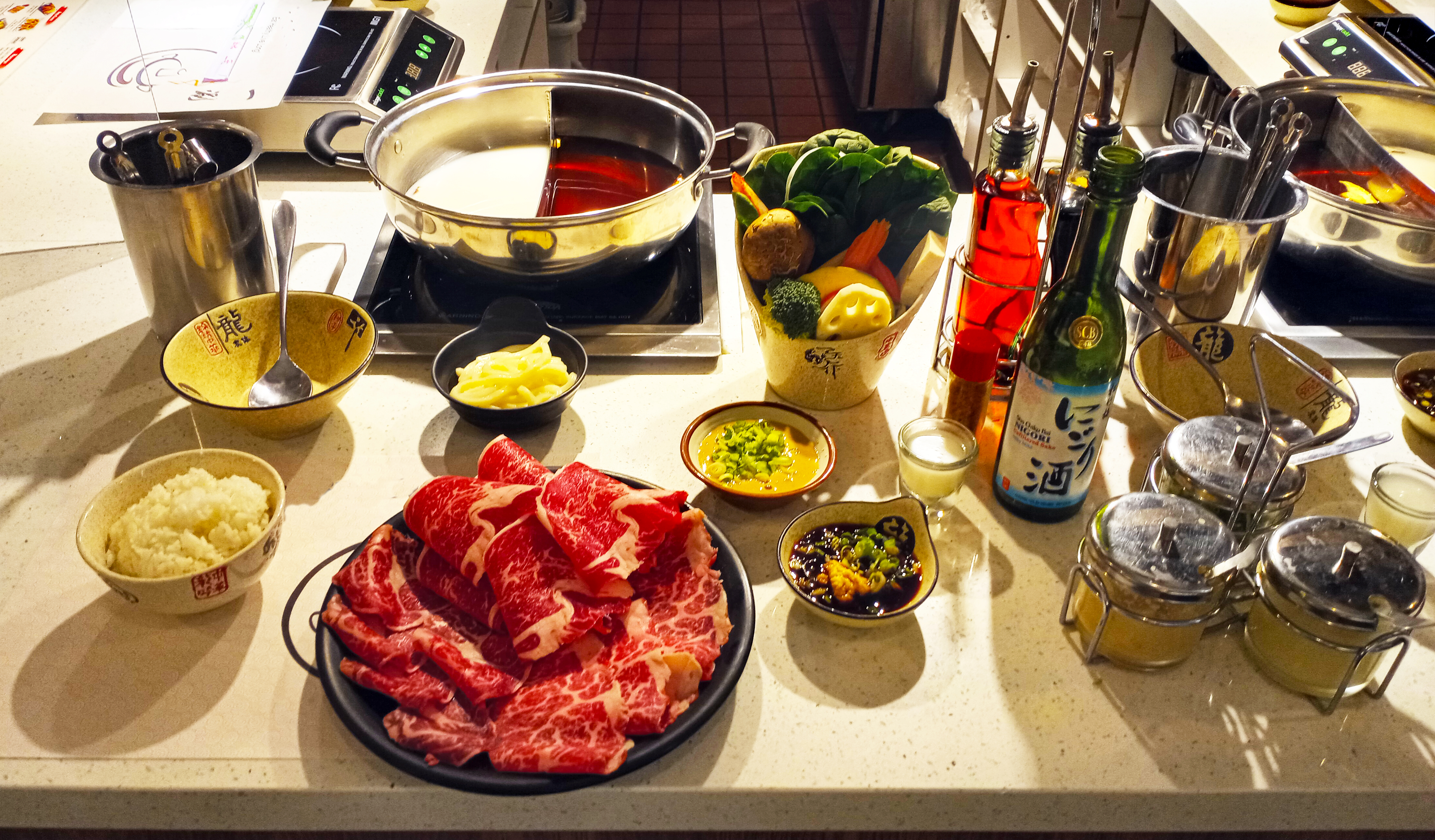
Sliced meat with sauces and two types of broth

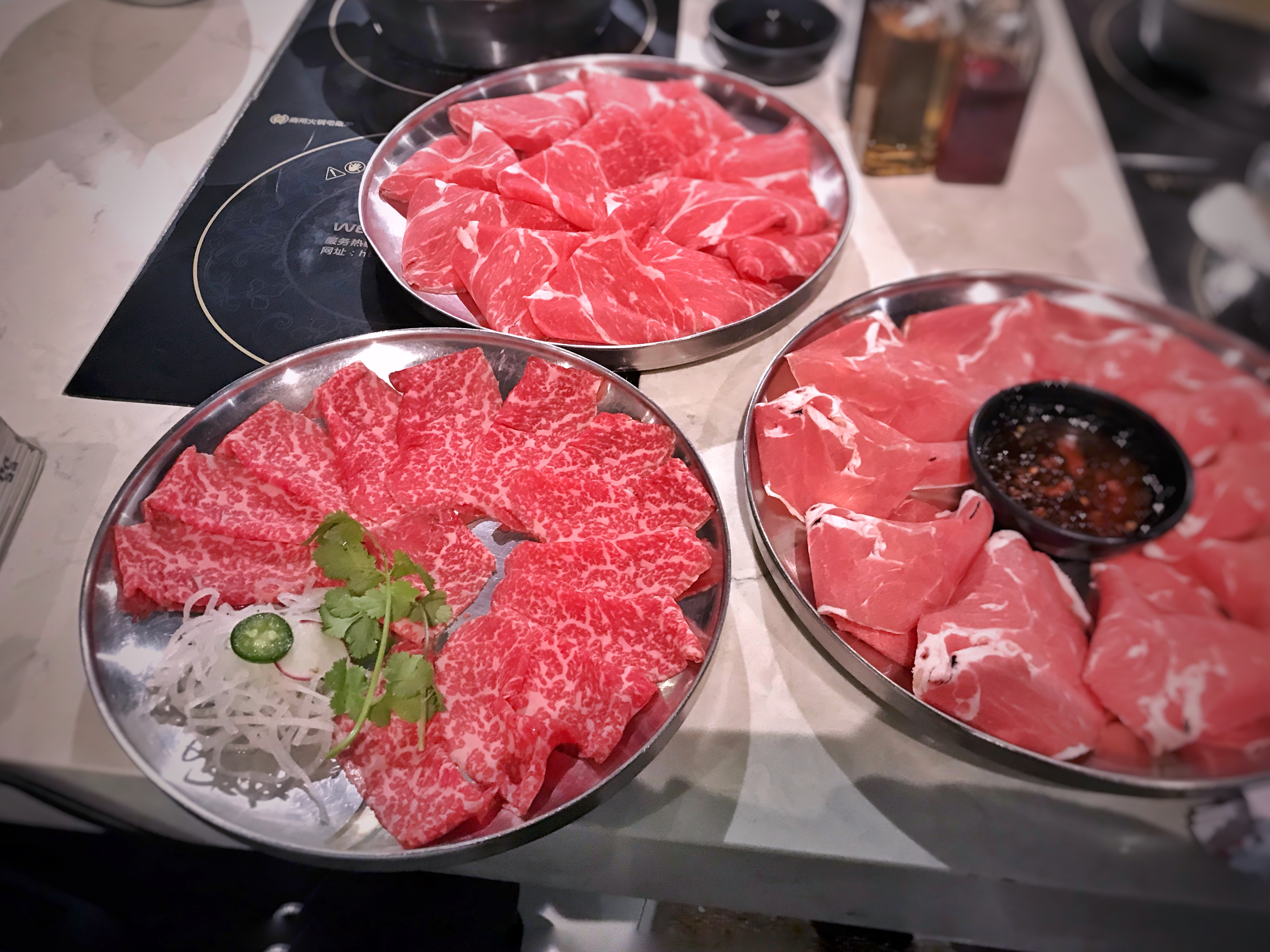
Sliced meats

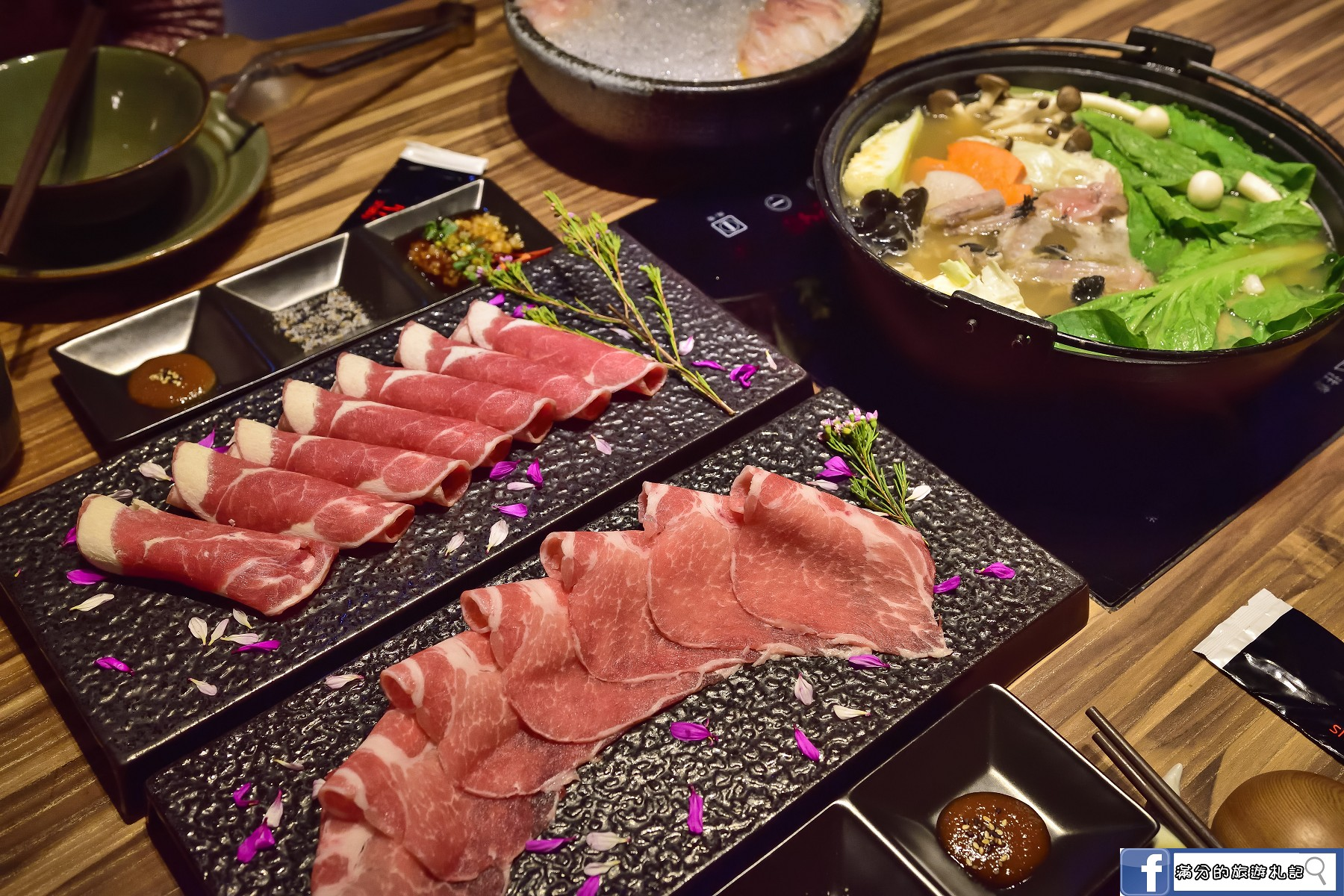
Meat and vegetable broth

=== General order to put ingredients into the pot ===
1. "shabu-shabu" some meat (the meat juices will add some flavor to the soup)
2. add ingredients which need some time to cook such as carrots, shiitake mushrooms, Chinese cabbage, etc.
3. add ingredients which are fast to cook such as tofu, green onions, mizuna and Chinese cabbage leaves.

Once the meat/fish and vegetables have been eaten, the soup stock will remain in the pot. The leftover broth from the pot can be customarily combined with rice, ramen or udon and the resulting dish is usually eaten last and called shime in Japan.

The variation with rice is also called zosui. When the cooked meat is served cold, it is called rei-shabu, which is often sold in convenience stores and supermarkets in Japan.

== Sauces and dippings ==
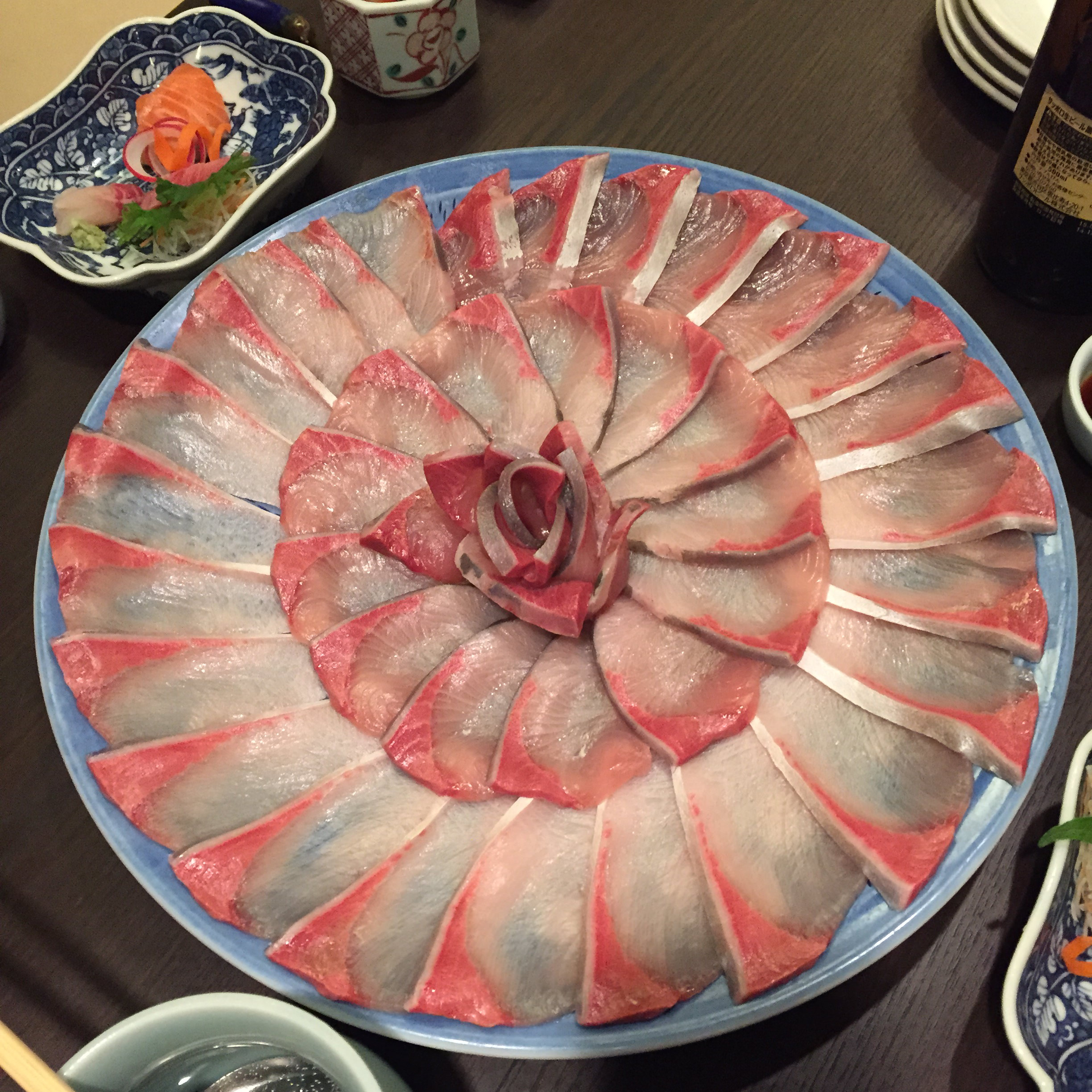
Raw yellowtail (buri) slices

A variety of sauces can be used to dip the meat and vegetables, including ponzu sauce and sesame sauce. Restaurants usually provide soy sauce, sesame paste, ponzu and several other condiment options, such as spring onions and Japanese pickled carrots, so customers can make the sauce according to their own preferences.

== Variations across Japan ==
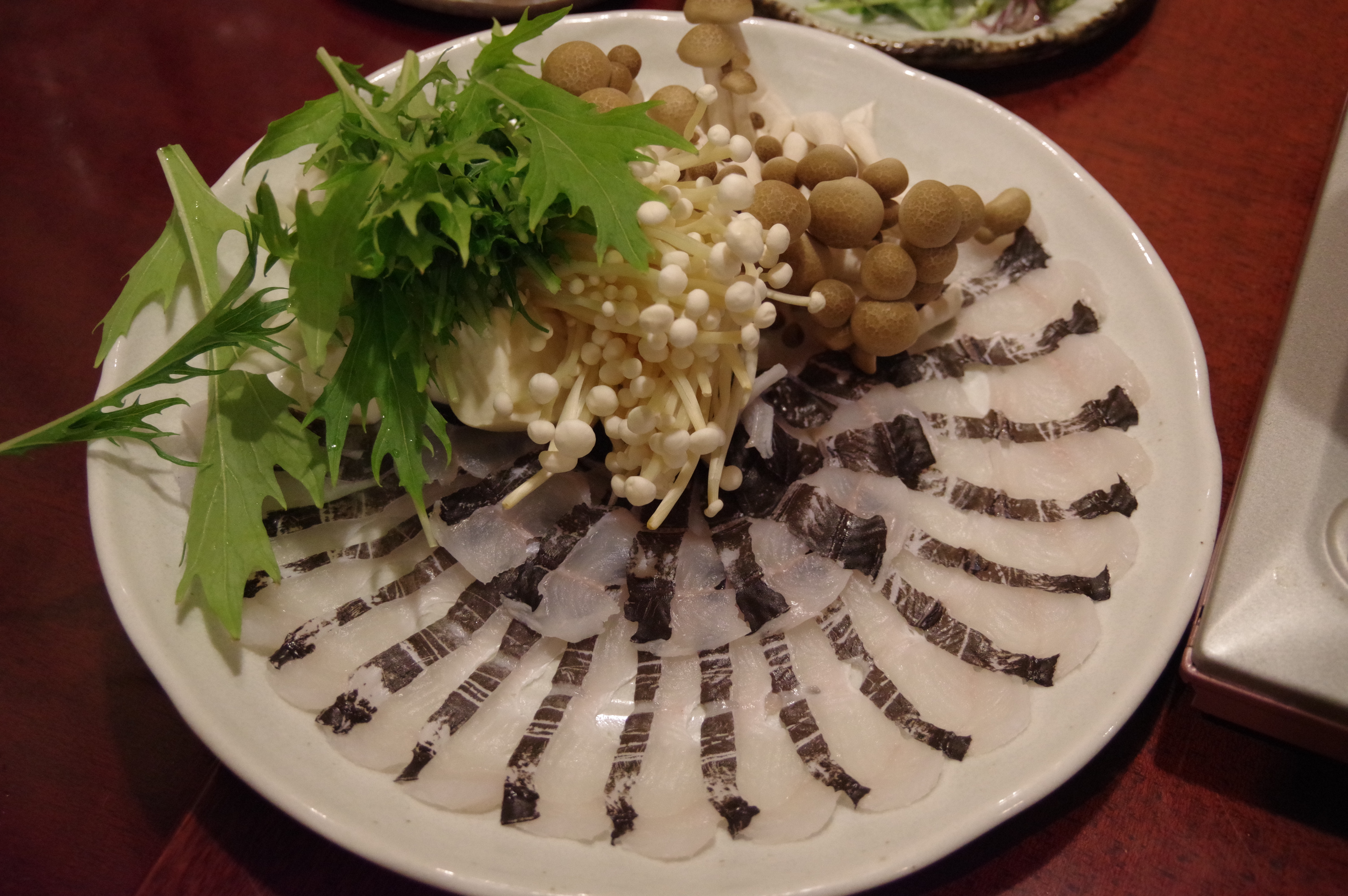
Raw conger eel slices

Beef, pork or chicken is usually used for shabu-shabu, but variations using fish are also available. Some fish used are yellowtail (buri), greater amberjack (kanpachi), or red seabream (tai). Octopus and crab are also used. For vegetables, lettuce or sliced daikon radish can be used instead of Chinese cabbage.

Regional ingredients include:

- Tōhoku: Kelp (Wakame no Shabu-shabu)
- Kansai: Daggertooth pike conger (Hamo-Shabu)
- Toyama: Yellowtail (Buri-Shabu)
- Hokkaido: Octopus (Tako-Shabu)
- Kagoshima: Kurobuta pork (Kurobuta-Shabu)
- Nagoya: Nagoya Cochin, a famous Japanese chicken breed (Tori-Shabu)

== See also ==
- List of Japanese soups and stews
- Oden
