= Shuhei Fujioka =

Japanese potter (born 1947)

Shuhei Fujioka (藤岡周平, Fujioka Shuhei) (b. 1947) is a Japanese potter known for his Iga ware.

== Biography ==
Born 1947 in the city of Matsuyama of Ehime prefecture, Shuhei Fujioka graduated from Ritsumeikan University in 1970. Being introduced through the Aichi Prefectural Pottery Practitioner School, master potter Mitsuo Tanimoto took him as his apprentice. In 1975, Fujioka built his kiln and opened his practice in Ueno, Mie prefecture.

His pottery has been shown in Japan, New York, and at many group galleries. His work is also on permanent exhibition at the Asian Art Museum in San Francisco, the Brooklyn Museum, the Contemporary Art Museum Ise, the Crueger Collection in Germany and the Gitter-Yelen Collection, New Orleans.
