= Shuhei Takada =

Japanese baseball player (born 1985)

Shuhei Takada 髙田 周平
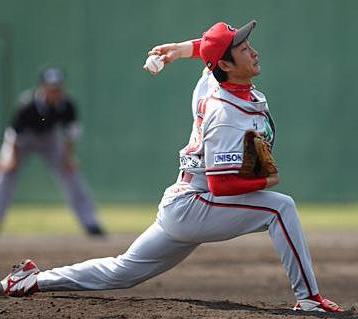
- Shuhei Takada

Shinano Grandserows – No. 19
- Pitcher
- Born: June 3, 1985 (age 40); Nishinomiya, Hyōgo, Japan
- Bats: Left Throws: Left

Teams
- Hanshin Tigers (2010–2011)

Shuhei Takada (髙田 周平, Takada Shuhei; born June 3, 1985 in Hyōgo, Japan) ("Shoo-Hey") is a Japanese left-handed pitcher for the Shinano Grandserows. He previously played for the Soka University, which has advanced to the semifinal of the All Japan University Baseball Championship Series 2005, the Grandserows, and the Hanshin Tigers.

== Pitches ==
Takada possesses numerous pitches in his repertoire: a four-seam fastball that ranges from 82-86 mph (132–138 km/h) with some abnormal movement, a changeup in the high 70s (113–117 km/h), a curveball at about 75 (120 km/h), a slider at about 78 (125 km/h), a forkball, and a sinker. Additionally, he is good at pick-off.

== Statistics (Baseball Challenge League) ==
Yr	Club	#	G	CG	SHO	無 四 球	W	L	SV	Pct	B	IP	H	HR	BB	HBP	SO	WP	BK	R	ER	ERA
2008	Shinano	32	24	6	1	1	4	8	0	.333	590	141.2	117	2	52	9	85	5	1	52	36	2.29
2009	Shinano	32	27	5	2	0	7	9	2	.438	548	127.0	121	8	38	12	119	7	0	53	42	2.98
Career			51	11	3	1	11	17	2	.393	1138	268.2	238	10	90	21	204	12	1	105	78	2.61

== Related links ==
- Baseball Challenge League
- Shinano Grandserows
- Shikoku-Kyūshū Island League
