= Malubianbian =

Chinese hot pot restaurant chain

- Simplified Chinese: 马路边边
- Traditional Chinese: 馬路邊邊
- Literal meaning: Side of the road (refers to hot pot establishments on side streets)
Transcriptions
Standard Mandarin
- Hanyu Pinyin: Mǎlù Biān Biān

Malubianbian (Chinese: 马路边边) is a Chinese hot pot chain. The company's headquarters is in Chengdu, Sichuan.

It was established in 2016. By 2021 the number of locations both in and outside China exceeded 1,000.

It opened its Los Angeles location in November 2019.

By 2021 it established its location in Houston. The decor of the Houston location is intended to give the imagery of street food establishments in Chengdu.
