= Nam chim =

Thai sauce

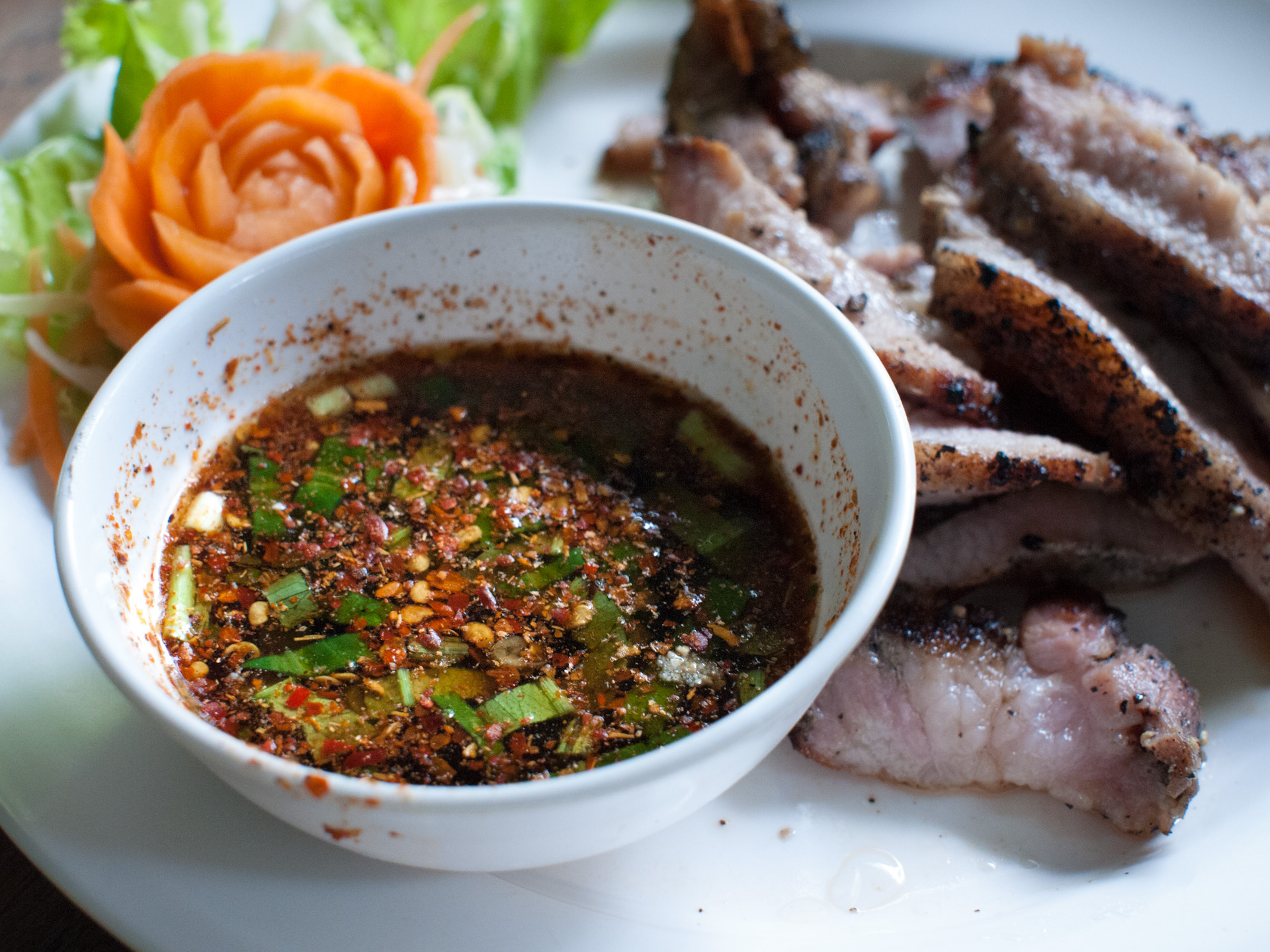
- Nam chim chaeo
- Type: Dip
- Place of origin: Thailand
- Region or state: Southeast Asia
- Created by: Thai people

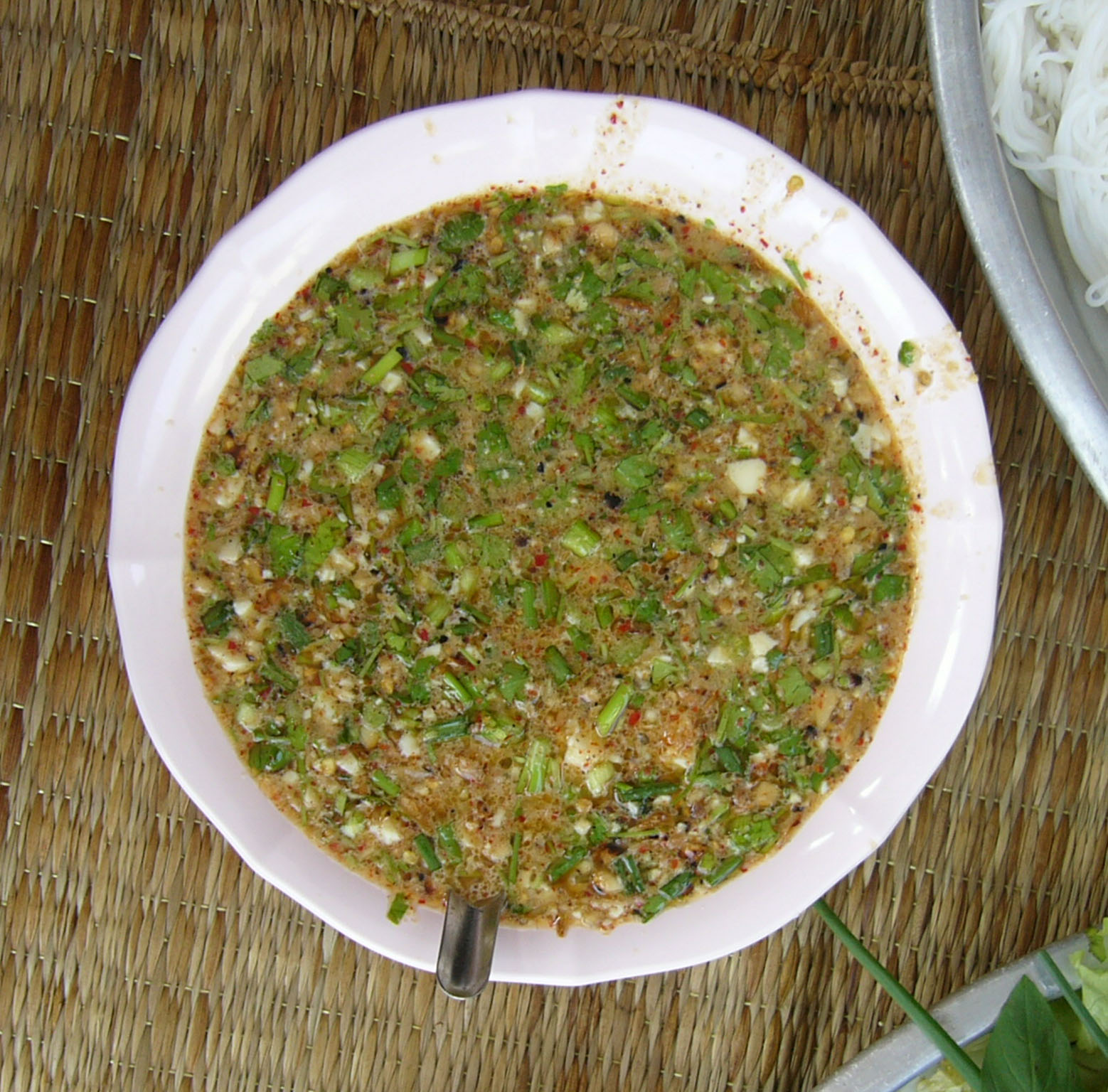
Nam chim paesa

Nam chim or nam jim (Thai: น้ำจิ้ม, IPA: [ná(ː)m tɕîm]) is Thai for "dipping sauce". It can refer to a wide variety of dipping sauces in Thai cuisine, with many of them a combination of salty, sweet, spicy and sour.

Nam chim tend to be more watery in consistency than nam phrik (Thai chili pastes). Although Sriracha sauce is commonly known as sot Sriracha in Thailand (sot is the Thai pronunciation of the English word sauce), it is sometimes called nam chim Sriracha or nam phrik Sriracha.

A more-or-less generic and basic nam chim is used for grilled or steamed seafood. This sauce contains garlic, fish sauce, sugar, lime juice, and bird's eye chilies. Variations on this basic recipe find their use as a dipping sauce with and as an integral part of many dishes. Many of the ingredients in a nam chim are finely chopped or pounded in a mortar and pestle or, non-traditionally, ground in a blender.

== History ==
The history of nam chim can be traced back to the Ayutthaya period of Thailand's history. French diplomat Simon de la Loubère, who visited Siam during the mid-Ayutthaya period, described the use of plain sauces with spices, garlic, chibols, or sweet herbs, as well as a fermented shrimp paste called kapi, which was commonly used to enhance the flavor of dishes. Many types of nam chim used in different dishes are mentioned in various cookbooks, including Mae Khrua Hua Pa (1908–1909) by Lady Plean Phatsakorawong, and "Nang Suea Kap Khao Son Luklan Kap Pholmai Khong Wang Lae Khanom" (1876-1961) by Mrs. Kleep Mahitorn. These early dipping sauces evolved over time, with various regional variations and styles emerging, resulting in countless unique blends of flavors and ingredients found in today's nam chim.

== Variants ==
Popular dipping sauces in Thailand are:

- Nam chim kai (Thai: น้ำจิ้มไก่), sweet chili sauce, is a very common all-around chili dipping sauce with the consistency of a thick syrup. It is medium-spicy and very sweet, normally referred to as "sweet Thai chili sauce" in English. It is often used as a dipping sauce for grilled chicken (kai yang). It can be used as a generic chili sauce for other dishes. It forms the base of a few other types of nam chim, such as nam chim thot man pla ("dipping sauce for deep-fried fish cakes").
- Nam chim chaeo (Thai: น้ำจิ้มแจ่ว), using ground dry-roasted glutinous rice, is most often eaten with mu yang (or mu ping) (grilled pork) or kai yang (grilled chicken).
- Nam chim sate (Thai: น้ำจิ้มสะเต๊ะ) is the Thai version of peanut sauce; it is eaten with Thai satay.
- Achat (Thai: อาจาด) is the Thai version of the Malay/Indonesian acar timun (cucumber pickles). The Thai variety consists of fresh chopped cucumber, spring onion and chili, mixed with vinegar. It is usually served with nam chim sate as a dip for satay.
- Nam chim suki (Thai: น้ำจิ้มสุกี้) is eaten with Thai suki (the Thai version of the Chinese hot pot) and mu kratha. The main ingredients are chili sauce, chili, garlic and sesame seeds.
- Nam chim taochiao (Thai: น้ำจิ้มเต้าเจี้ยว), containing yellow soybean paste (taochiao), is eaten with khao man kai.
- Nam chim thale (Thai: น้ำจิ้มทะเล), a basic dipping sauce made with garlic, fish sauce, lime juice, sugar and chilis, is usually eaten with grilled or steamed seafood.
- Nam chim thot man (Thai: น้ำจิ้มทอดมัน), served as a dip with thot man pla (fried fish cakes), is similar to nam chim kai but with chopped cucumber, crushed peanut and coriander (cilantro) leaves. For thot man kung or pu (fried prawn or crab cakes), however, a very sweet plum sauce is provided.
- Nam chim paesa (Thai: น้ำจิ้มแป๊ะซะ) is served as a sauce for steamed fish wrapped in steamed cabbage leaves.

== See also ==
- List of Thai ingredients
- List of Thai dishes
- List of condiments
- List of dips
- List of sauces
