= Sukiyaki =

Japanese hot pot dish

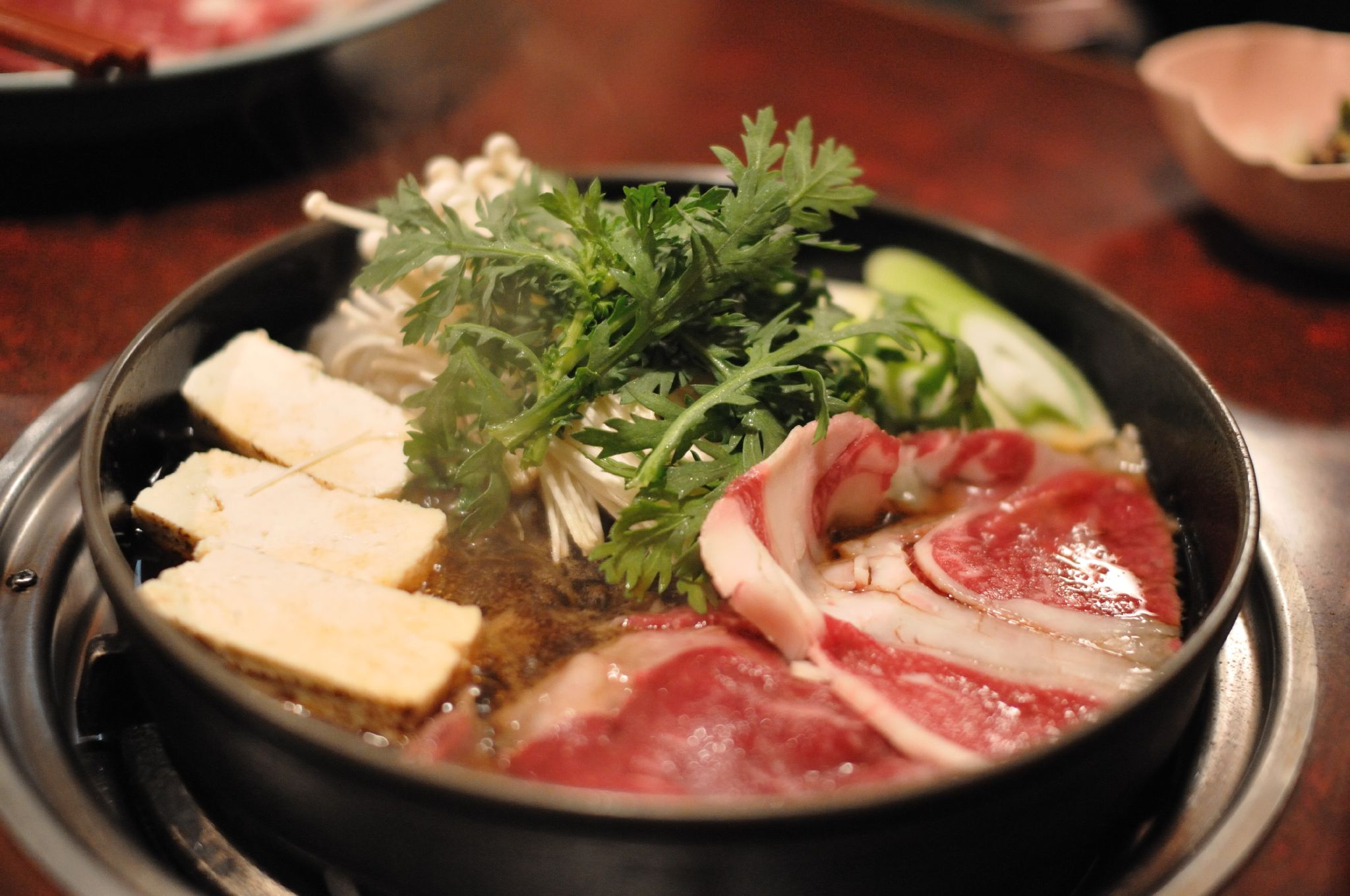
- Type: Hot pot
- Place of origin: Japan
- Region or state: East Asia
- Main ingredients: Meat (usually thinly sliced beef), vegetables, soy sauce, sugar, and mirin

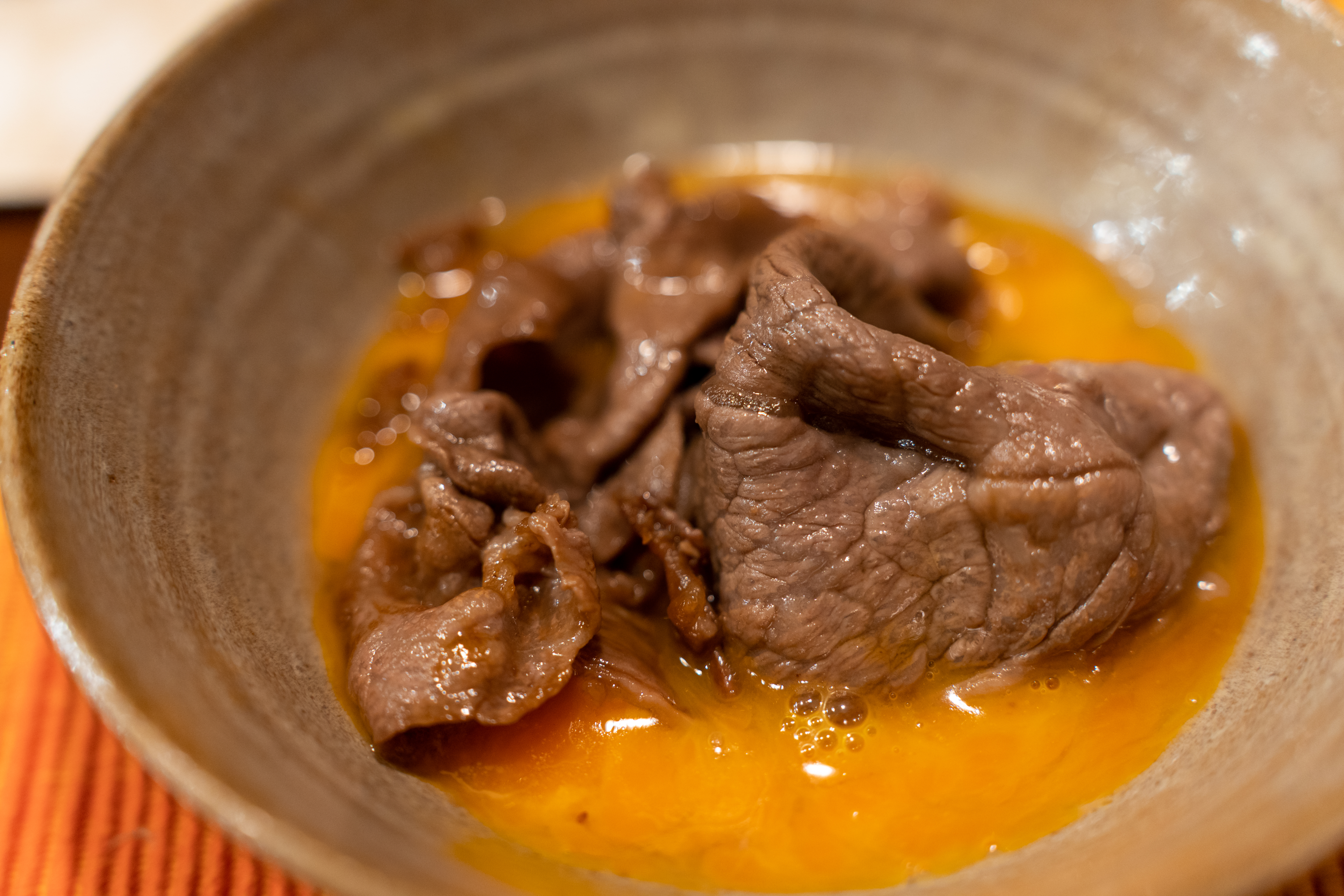
Sukiyaki beef in raw egg

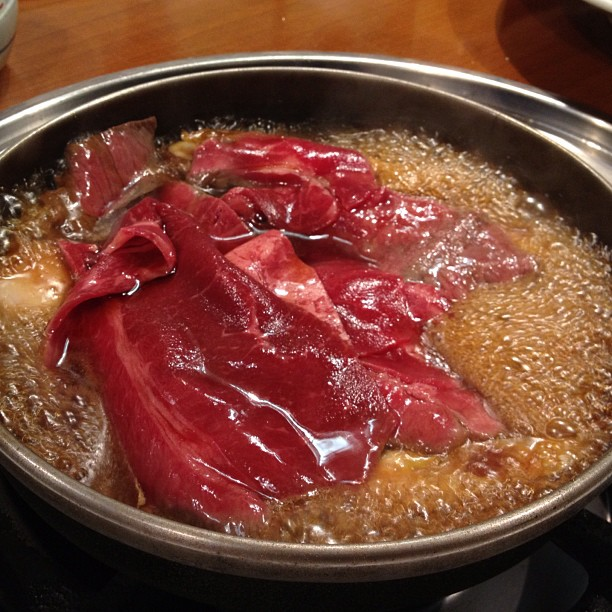
Sliced cuts of beef in soy sauce-based hotpot

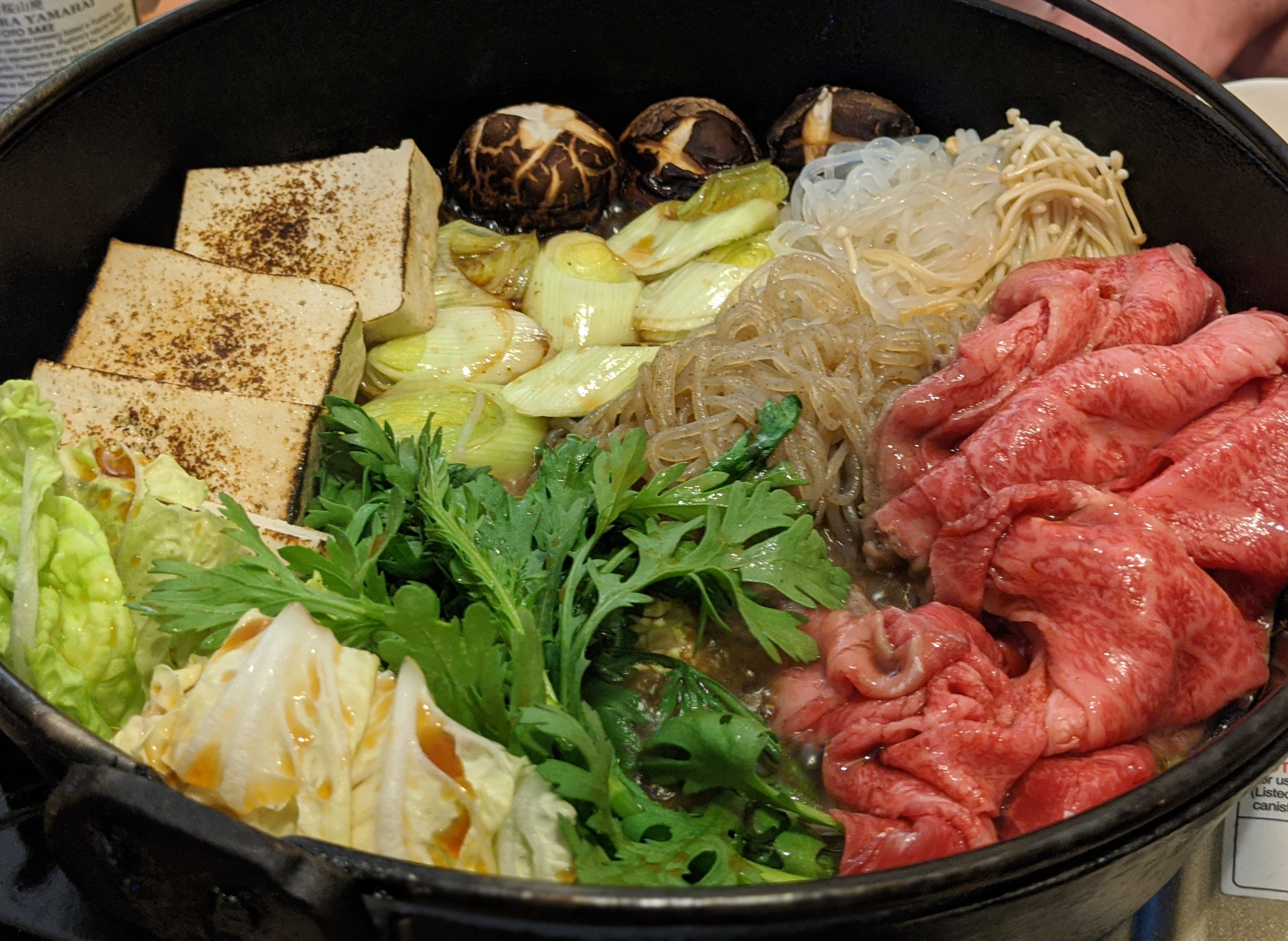
Ingredients of sukiyaki

Sukiyaki (鋤焼; or more commonly すき焼き; [sɯ̥kijaki]) is a Japanese dish that is prepared and served in the nabemono (Japanese hot pot) style.

It consists of meat (usually thinly sliced beef) which is slowly cooked or simmered at the table, alongside vegetables and other ingredients, in a shallow iron pot in a mixture of soy sauce, sugar, and mirin. The ingredients are usually dipped in a small bowl of raw, beaten eggs after being cooked in the pot, and then eaten.

Generally sukiyaki is a winter dish and it is commonly found at bōnenkai, Japanese year-end parties.

== Ingredients ==
Thinly sliced beef is usually used for sukiyaki, although in the past, in certain parts of the country (notably Hokkaido and Niigata) pork was also popular.

Popular ingredients cooked with the beef are:

- Tofu (usually seared firm tofu).
- Negi (a type of scallion).
- Leafy vegetables, such as Chinese cabbage and shungiku (garland chrysanthemum leaves).
- Mushrooms, such as shiitake and enokitake.
- Glass noodles made out of konnyaku or corm, such as ito konnyaku, or shirataki noodles.

Boiled wheat udon or mochi (rice-cakes) are sometimes added, usually at the end to soak up the broth.

== Preparation ==
Sukiyaki is a one-pot dish (nabemono) that was developed during the Meiji era. Different regions have different ways of preparing sukiyaki. There are two main styles, the Kanto style from eastern Japan and Kansai style from western Japan.

In the Kanto style, warishita (a mixture of sake, soy sauce, sugar, mirin and dashi) is poured and heated in a pot, then meat, vegetables and other ingredients are added and simmered together. In Kansai-style sukiyaki, meat is heated in the pot first. When the meat is almost cooked, sugar, sake and soy sauce are added, then vegetables and other ingredients are added last.

The vegetables and meat used are different between the two styles. Because beef was expensive in the past, the use of pork was common in northern and eastern regions. Other ingredients added to modern sukiyaki include chicken (tori-suki), fish (uo-suki or oki-suki), udon noodles (udon-suki), negi, shiitake mushrooms, shirataki and slightly grilled tofu. In both styles, raw eggs are used as a dipping sauce and steamed rice with black sesame seeds is served.

== Etymology ==
One theory for the origin of the name is that it derives from the words suki (鋤), which means spade, and yaki (焼き), which is the verb "to grill". During the Edo period (1603–1868), farmers used suki to cook things like fish and tofu. However, sukiyaki became a traditional Japanese dish during the Meiji era (1868–1912). Another theory is that the name comes from the word sukimi (剥き身), which means "thinly sliced meat". The spade derivation is doubted by some, who note that the name sukiyaki may not have entered Japanese until the Taishō era and that the dish was previously known as gyūnabe.

== History ==
Buddhism was introduced to Japan during the Asuka period. At that time, killing animals was against Buddhist law. Also eating beef was prohibited since cattle were considered work animals. However, people could eat meat under some special circumstances, such as when they were sick, or at special events, like bōnenkai, the year-end drinking party. During the Edo period, eating game, such as boar and duck, was common and not forbidden. In the 1860s, when Japan opened its ports to foreign merchants, foreigners who came to Japan introduced the culture of eating meat and new cooking styles. Cows, milk, meat, and eggs became widely used, and sukiyaki was a popular way to serve them. At first, cattle were imported from neighboring countries like Korea and China as the demand for beef increased. Sukiyaki possibly originated and became popular in the Kansai region. Following the 1923 Great Kantō earthquake, many beef restaurants in Tokyo were closed and many people in Kantō temporarily moved to the Osaka area. While the people of Kantō were in Osaka, they got accustomed to the Kansai style of sukiyaki, and when they returned to Kantō, they introduced the Kansai sukiyaki style, where it has since become popular. Beef is the primary ingredient in today's sukiyaki.

Sukiyaki became prominent in U.S. Japanese restaurants by the 1930s. In 1959, food writer for the New York Times Craig Claiborne wrote that the dish was among the four most requested recipes the newspaper had received over the previous year.

In 1978 W.L. Taitte stated in Texas Monthly that sukiyaki was "the most famous but hardly the most characteristic Japanese dish." By the 1980s, in the U.S., sukiyaki was becoming obscure as sushi became more prominent.

== In popular culture ==
The 1961 song "Ue wo Muite Arukō" was given the alternative title "Sukiyaki" so that it could be short and recognizably Japanese in English-speaking countries. Despite the title, the lyrics have no connection to sukiyaki.

Swedish comedian and singer Povel Ramel wrote a song, the "Sukiyaki Syndrome", wherein the restaurant customer wants sukiyaki. There are a number of variations, each with a description so long that by the time he orders any of them, the restaurant has run out.

== Related dishes ==
- Shabu-shabu is similar, but whereas sukiyaki is considered sweeter, shabu-shabu is more savory. Shabu-shabu meat is even more thinly sliced and the individual slices of meat are cooked by dipping them into simmering liquid at the table, while sukiyaki is cooked in a more casserole style.
- Sukiyaki in Laos takes the form of a bowl of bean thread noodles, various vegetables, thinly sliced beef and other meats or seafood, sukiyaki sauce, and a raw egg in beef broth. The sukiyaki sauce is made from coconut, fermented tofu, tahini, peanut butter, sugar, garlic, lime, and spices.
- Thai suki or Thai sukiyaki is a very popular hotpot dish in Thailand and its vicinity.
- Hotpot
- Fondue Bourguignonne and fondue chinoise

== See also ==
- List of Japanese soups and stews
- Gyūdon
