= Chim chum =

Southeast Asian street food

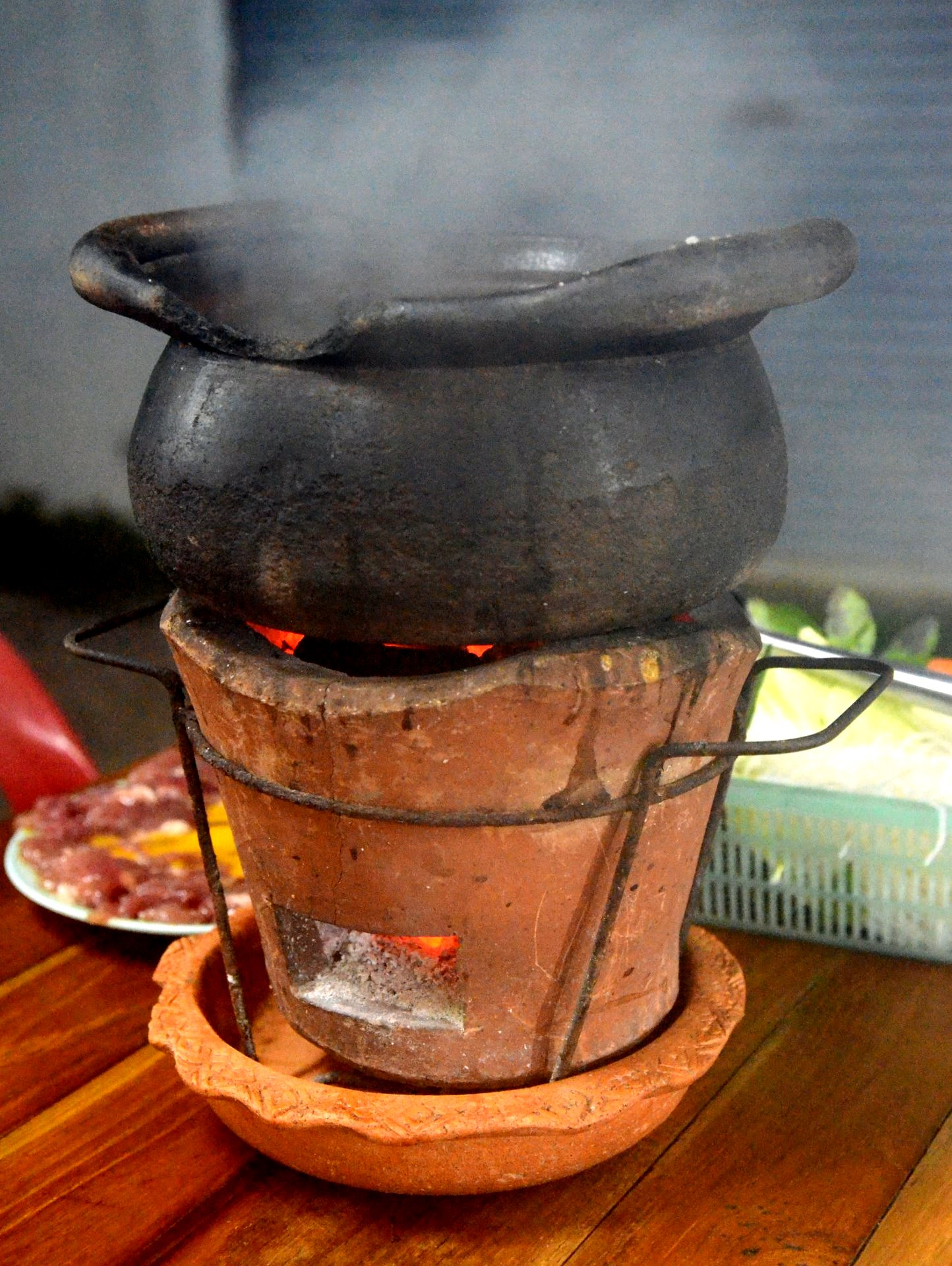
- Chim chum
- Region or state: Southeast Asia
- Associated cuisine: Thailand, Laos
- Main ingredients: Pork, chicken, herbs, vegetables

Chim chum (Thai: จิ้มจุ่ม, pronounced [tɕîm tɕùm]; Northeastern Thai: แจ่วฮ้อน, pronounced [tɕɛ́w hɔ̂ːn]) is a Southeast Asian street food, popular especially in Thailand. It is traditionally made with chicken or pork and fresh herbs such as galangal, sweet basil, lemongrass and kaffir lime leaves, cooked in a small clay pot on a charcoal stove. It is often served with nam chim.

An earthenware pot on a tabletop brazier cooks broth with vegetables and herbs. Thai northeastern people call this dish chaeo hon (แจ่วฮ้อน)

== Etymology ==
In Thai chim means to dip in, and chum means to dunk something into liquid.

== Description ==
Traditionally, chim chum is served inside an earthenware pot. The broth fills with an abundance of herbs that are boiled with fuel from heated charcoal, giving an aromatic sense of herbs in the soup. The pieces are dipped into dipping sauces for additional flavor. The dish is always served with fresh vegetables and meat along with vermicelli and dipping sauce. Additionally, the dish is ready to eat at a gentle boiling temperature. After that the consumers can put all the ingredients into the pot. Chim chum can be prepared and eaten at home or in a restaurant.

== Origin ==
The origin of this dish comes from Isan, the northeastern part of Thailand where it is locally called Jaew Hon. In the Isan language, Jaew means sauce and Hon means hot describing the flavourful sauce that is mixed with hot broth. The broth in Jaew Hon is still very aromatic and contains a lot of herbs like the more modern Chim chum but with a few additional ingredients. It is darker, usually made by mixing Jaew which is a flavourful sauce made with blended roasted aromatic ingredients and bone broth. This sometimes contains pork or beef blood and has a bit of bitterness from Kee Pia. Kee pia, the word kee meaning feces, is an ingredient taken from the intestines of grass eating animals such as cows, buffalos and goats. It is a mixture of digestive enzymes and semi digested grass and fibres with a dark greenish brown colour which adds an earthy bitterness to food.

== History ==
=== Clay pot ===
The very first clay pot cooking from 20,000 years ago was found at Xianrendong Cave in Jiangxi province. It is the evidence of communal feasting, the art of slow cooking and the joy of sharing food. The earthenware pot or clay pot has particular characteristics at spreading heat all over the pot. The clay generally takes longer to fully heat than a metal pot, but once it does, it retains that heat and allows for steady, gentle cooking. It gives the distinctive flavors and textures that only clay pot cooking can provide. Moreover, earthenware pots are alkaline in nature which means it neutralizes the acidic nature of food, retains the pH balance and makes food easy to digest for the consumers. The uniqueness of Chim chum is its slow cooking, a major cooking method used to cook food slowly over a long period of time. The food inside the pot loses little to no moisture because it is surrounded by steam, creating a tender, flavorful dish. Water absorbed within the walls of the pot prevents burning so long as the pot is not allowed to dry completely. Because no oil needs to be added with this cooking technique, food cooked in clay is often lower in fat than food prepared by other methods.

== Common ingredients ==
=== Soup ===
The recipes for making soup includes:

- Chicken broth
- Galangal
- Lemongrass
- Fish sauce
- Sugar
- Salt
- Tamarind juice
- Kaffir lime
- Chili
- Basil leaf
- Cilantro
- Beaf

=== Ingredients ===
It depends on each restaurant but commonly they serve:

- Sliced meat
- Pork
- Vermicelli
- Egg
- Mushroom
- Basil leaf
- Lettuce

Especially, the meat dish will be served with egg on top of it.

=== Nam chim (dipping) ===
- Cayenne pepper
- Fish sauce
- Lime
- Ground roasted rice
- Coriander
- Scallion root

== Regional variations ==
=== Asia cuisines ===
==== Isan ====
Jaew hon is originally from Isan, a clay hot pot with a spicy, sour, fresh herbs and strong seasoning. The food from Laos and Isan often used kee pia, which is a key ingredient that makes up exotic flavors.

==== Laos ====
Chim chum is also known as “chum-Laos” in Laos. The recipes are similar to chim chum but they add chives and dill. Also, chum-Laos is more sour, sweet and salty at the same time compared to chim chum which is much more herbal.

==== China ====
Chuan chuan, meaning “skewered food” is a sort of remix of the classic hot pot theme. Unlike traditional hotpot, however, the ingredients of chuan chuan are skewered on sticks and then placed in the boiling oil within a clay or iron pot, making it more convenient to pick up the food after it is cooked in the pot.

==== Japan ====
Nabemono or nabe is a variety of Japanese hotpot dishes, also known as one-pot dishes. Hotpot is a significant culture in Japan; one of the famous clay hotpot dishes called chanko nabe or sumo stew from Japan is a very protein-rich dish and is usually served in large quantities of meat and vegetables with rice, udon or beer aside. This food is the traditional method for Japanese's wrestlers to gain weight.

== Similar dishes ==
- Shabu-shabu

This dish is a similar Japanese variety that consists of thinly sliced meat and vegetables that are boiled in a pot at the dining table and eaten with a dipping sauce.

- Mala

This Chinese dish is a spicy and numbing seasoning made from Sichuan peppercorn and chili. Most commonly, mala is made into a sauce by simmering it in oil and other spices. Mala is the same as Chim-Chum with neither the way of eating nor ingredients for dipping and dropping but the taste much more spicy and numb. On the contrary, this dish uses an electric cooking pot instead of clay pot.

- Pho

Originally from Vietnam, boiled in an electric cooking pot and simmered all ingredients inside the pot. The word pho is not the name of the food but the name of Vietnamese noodle.

- Tajine or tagine

This dish is a North African food and is a slow-cooked savory stew, typically made with sliced meats, poultry or fish together with vegetables or fruits. Traditionally, tagines are made in earthenware, but nowadays for the convenience, many cooks prefer tagines made in metal or flameproof glazed ceramic ware.

== See also ==
- Nam chim
