= Mu kratha =

Thai table-cooked dish

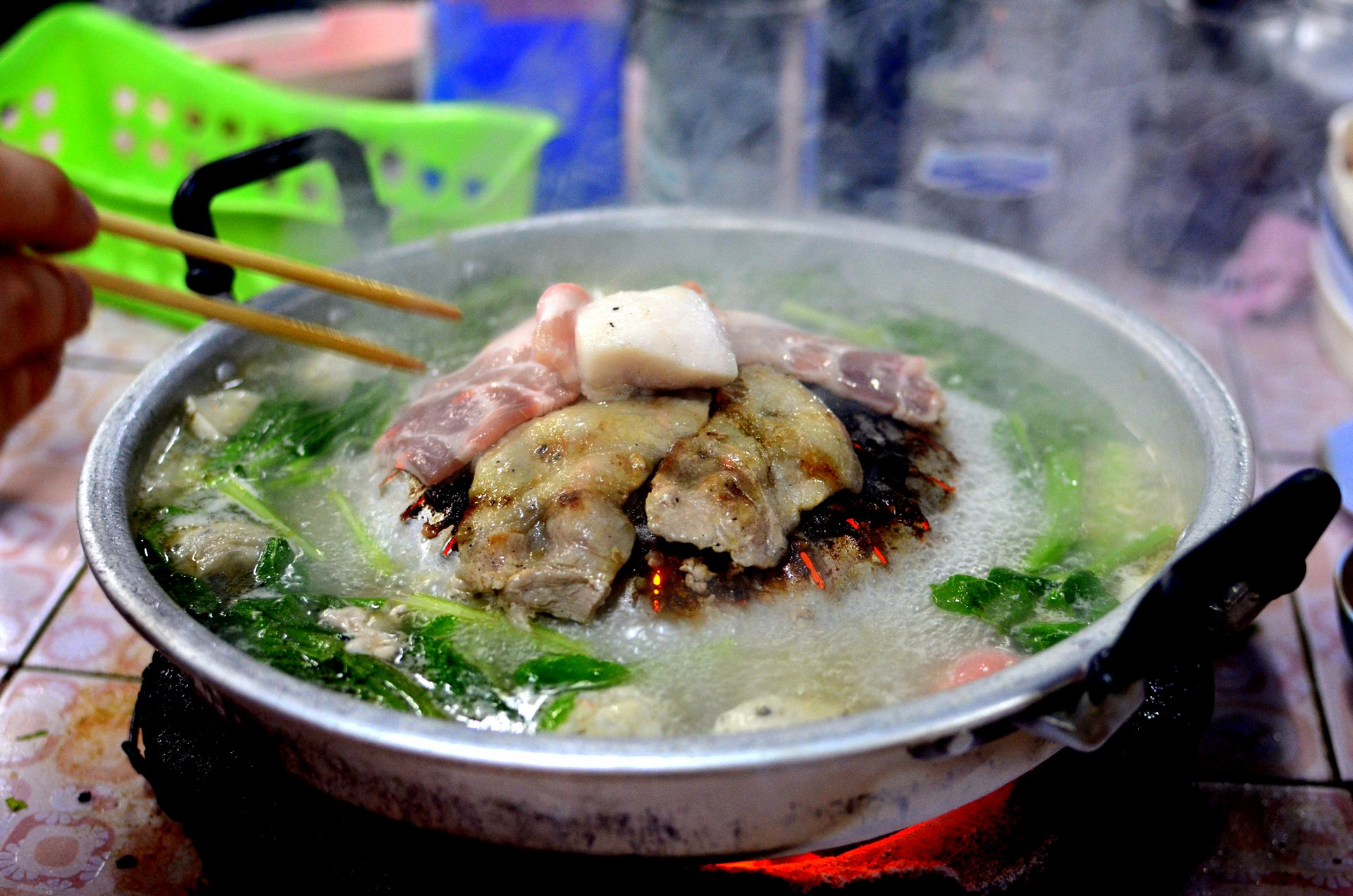
- Mu kratha
- Place of origin: Thailand
- Region or state: Southeast Asia
- Associated cuisine: Singapore, Malaysia, Indonesia, Philippines, Laos and Thailand

Mu kratha (Thai: หมูกระทะ, RTGS: mu kratha, pronounced [mǔː krā.tʰáʔ]) is a Southeast Asia cooking method, originating in Thailand. In the Philippines, Singapore, Malaysia, and Myanmar it is known as mookata. In Laos, it is known as sin dat (Lao: ຊີ້ນດາດ).

== History ==
Mu kratha means 'pan pork' in Thai (mu is 'pig' or 'pork' and kratha is 'pan' or 'skillet'). Mu kratha resembles a combination of a Korean barbecue with a Japanese or Chinese hot pot. The Thai version uses charcoal. The dining concept spread throughout Thailand and into Laos, the Philippines, Malaysia, Indonesia and Singapore. Mu kratha became popular in Thailand during the late 20th century, especially in the 19s, as buffet-style dining gained popularity. This cooking method allows diners to prepare a variety of meats, seafood, vegetables, and noodles.

== Preparation and serving ==
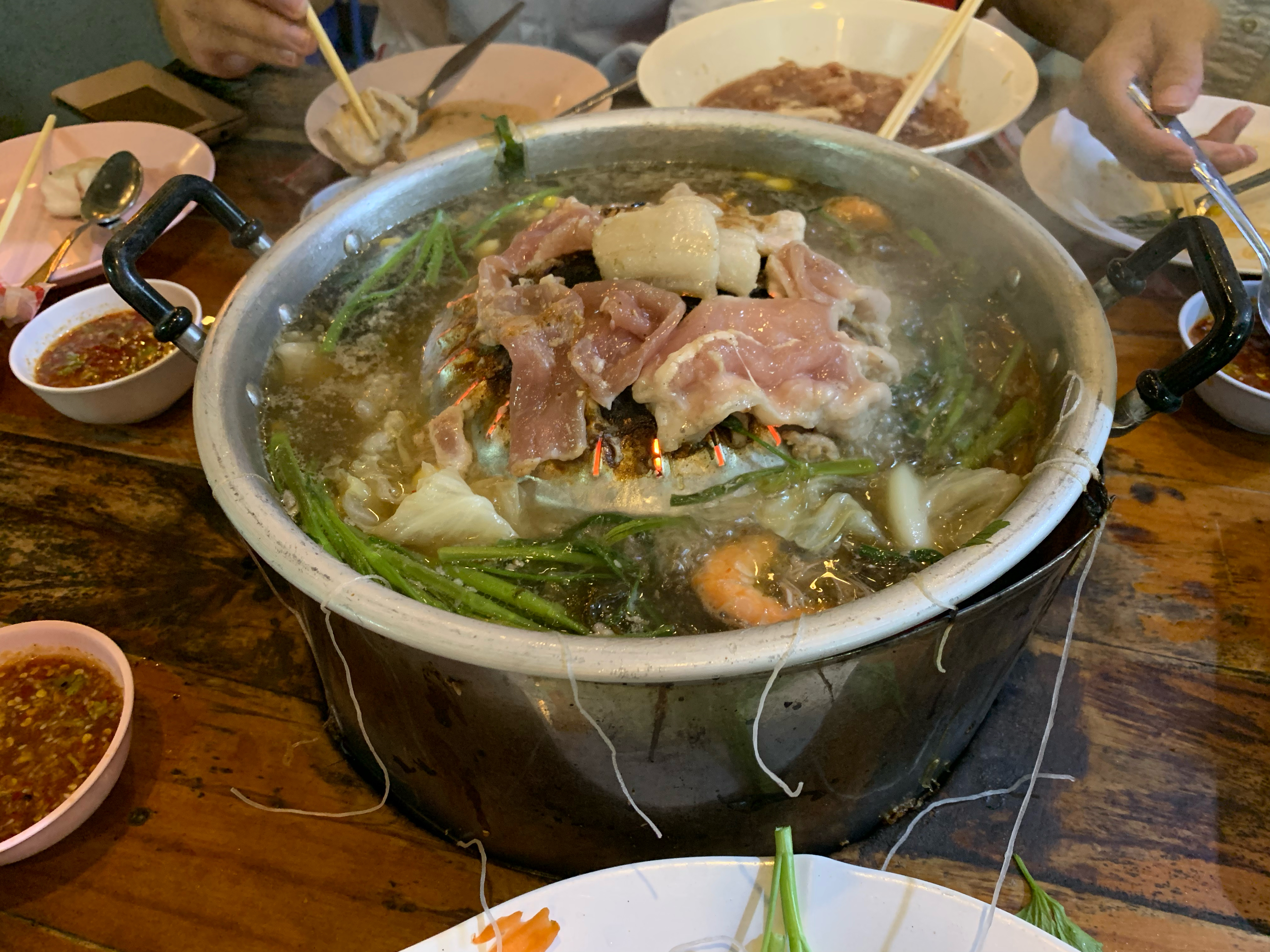
A mu kratha served in Ban Na with sauces

Sliced meat (most often pork) is grilled on the dome in the centre while the vegetables and other ingredients, such as fish balls, cook in the soup (also called Thai suki). The hot pot sits on a pail of burning charcoal which grills or boils the food. The best foods for this cooking method are pork, chicken, mutton, lamb, seafood, vegetables, and mushrooms. The local traditional Thai mu kratha is usually served with nam chim suki, a popular dipping sauce. It is well known for using chili sauce as the main ingredient. Some restaurants serve "nam chim seafood" to accompany seafood.

When cooking mu kratha, a chunk of fat is commonly grilled at the apex of the pan to prevent food from sticking.

== Sauces and dippings ==
Mu kratha is usually served with dipping sauces made from chili, garlic, lime, and fermented soybean sauce. The sauce adds flavor to the grilled meat and vegetables

== See also ==
- Barbecue
- Barbecue grill
- Regional variations of barbecue
- List of Thai dishes
- Thai cuisine
