= Thai suki =

Thai hot pot

Thai suki (สุกี้ไทย)
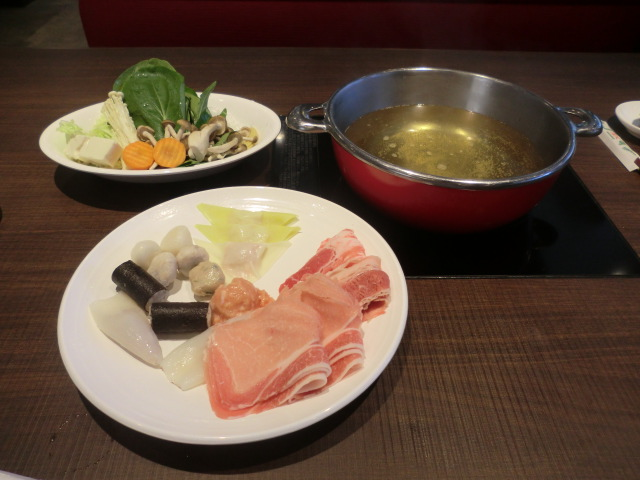
- Thai sukiyaki at MK restaurant.
- Type: Hot pot
- Place of origin: Thailand
- Region or state: Southeast Asia
- Associated cuisine: Thai cuisine
- Main ingredients: Meat or seafood, nam chim
- [[Commons:Category:Thai suki|Media: Thai suki (สุกี้ไทย)]]

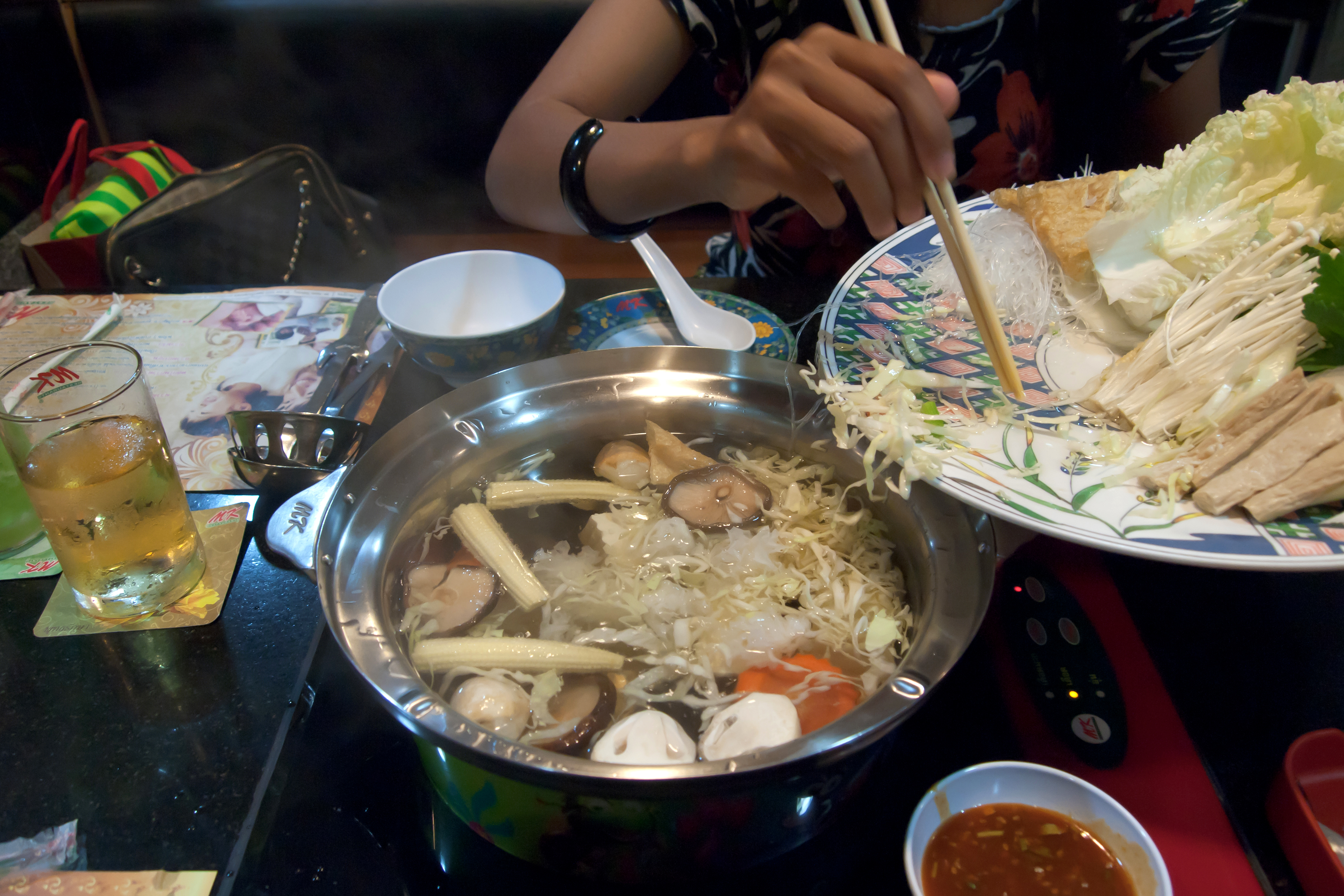
Thai hot pot preparation

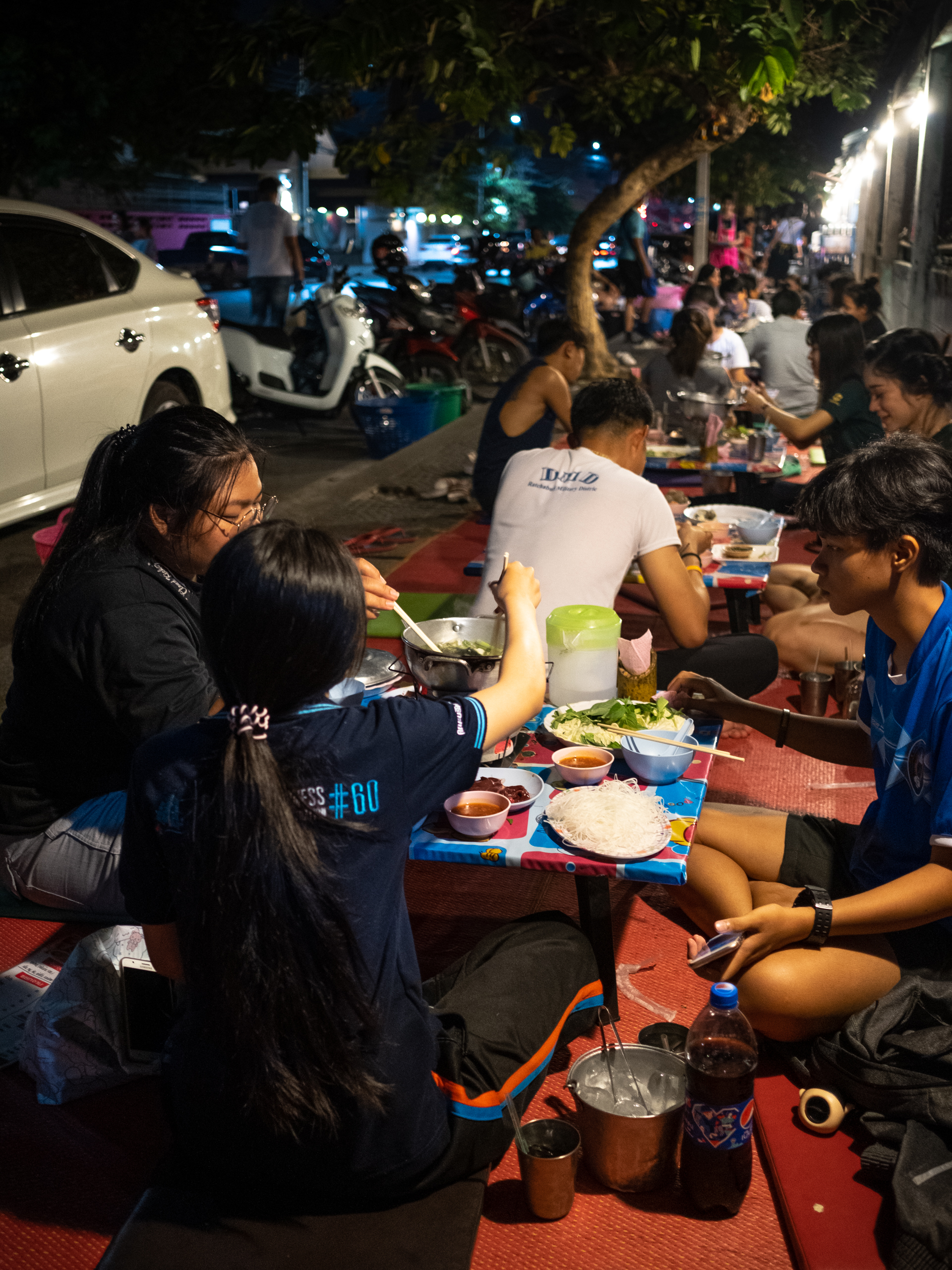
Thai suki as street food in Nakhon Ratchasima

Thai suki, known simply as suki (Thai: สุกี้, pronounced [sū.kîː]) in Thailand, is a Thai variant of hot pot, a communal dish where diners dip meat, seafood, noodles, dumplings and vegetables into a pot of broth cooking at the table and dip them into a spicy "sukiyaki sauce" before eating. Despite the name, the dish only barely resembles Japanese sukiyaki, having more in common with shabu shabu and Chinese hot pot.

Thai sukiyaki evolved from Chinese hot pot served in restaurants catering to members of Thailand's sizeable ethnic Chinese clientele, in which an aluminum pot was heated on a charcoal fire at the table and the raw ingredients presented on one big plate.

In 1957, a restaurant called Coca opened its first branch in Soi Tantawan, Bangkok, offering a modified version of the Chinese hot pot under the Japanese name of Sukiyaki. Although it only vaguely resembled Japanese sukiyaki, it was a catchy name for it because of a Japanese pop song called "Sukiyaki" which was a big worldwide hit at the time. This modified Thai version proved to be a massive hit, and it wasn't long before other chains started opening "suki" restaurants across Bangkok and other cities, each with its own special dipping sauce as the selling point.

In Thai sukiyaki, diners have more options of ingredients to choose from, each portion being considerably smaller in order to enable diners to order many more varieties. The spicy dipping sauce (nam chim suki) caters to Thai tastes, too, with much chili sauce, chili, lime and coriander leaves added. The raw ingredients are presented on small plates and are cooked at the table in a gas- or electrically heated stainless steel pot containing broth. Usually, an egg is added to the broth at the start of the meal.

Today the MK Restaurant chain, which opened its first restaurant in 1962 on Siam Square in Bangkok, is the most popular in Thailand with around 430 restaurants across the country and 23 in Japan. Coca is making a rapid spread abroad, too, already serving Thai suki in 24 outlets across Asia and Australia and further outlets planned in the US and Europe. Other popular chains include Texas and Lailai.
