= Hot pot =

Type of Chinese dish

Hotpot
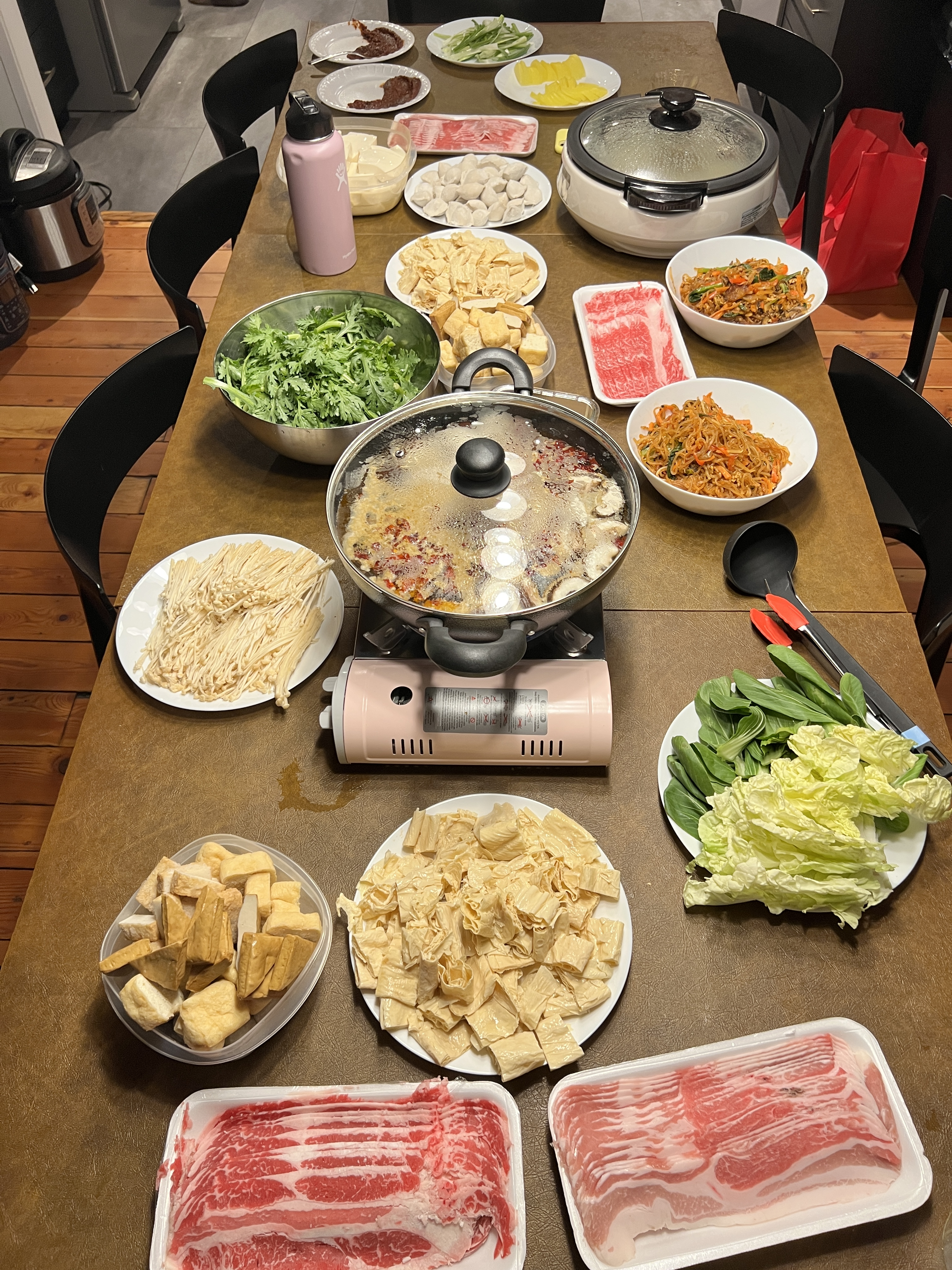
- Presentation of uncooked hot pot ingredients
- Course: Main dishes
- Place of origin: China
- Region or state: East Asia, Southeast Asia
- Main ingredients: Meat, vegetables, mushrooms, dumplings, seafood, broth

Hot pot
- Traditional Chinese: 火鍋
- Simplified Chinese: 火锅
- Literal meaning: "fire pot"
Transcriptions
Standard Mandarin
- Hanyu Pinyin: huǒguō
- Bopomofo: ㄏㄨㄛˇ ㄍㄨㄛ
- Wade–Giles: huo^{3}-kuo^{1}
- Tongyong Pinyin: huǒ-guo
- IPA: [xwò.kwó]
Southern Min
- Hokkien POJ: Hué-ko

Cantonese name
- Traditional Chinese: 打邊爐 or 打甂爐
- Simplified Chinese: 打边炉 or 打甂炉
Transcriptions
Yue: Cantonese
- Yale Romanization: Dá-bīn-lòuh
- Jyutping: daa2 bin1 lou4
- IPA: [ta˧˥ pin˥ lɔw˩]

Hot pot or hotpot (traditional Chinese: 火鍋; simplified Chinese: 火锅; pinyin: huǒguō; lit. 'fire pot'), also known as steamboat, is a dish of soup or stock kept simmering in a pot by a heat source on the table, accompanied by an array of raw meats, vegetables and soy-based foods which diners quickly cook by dipping in the broth.

== Description ==
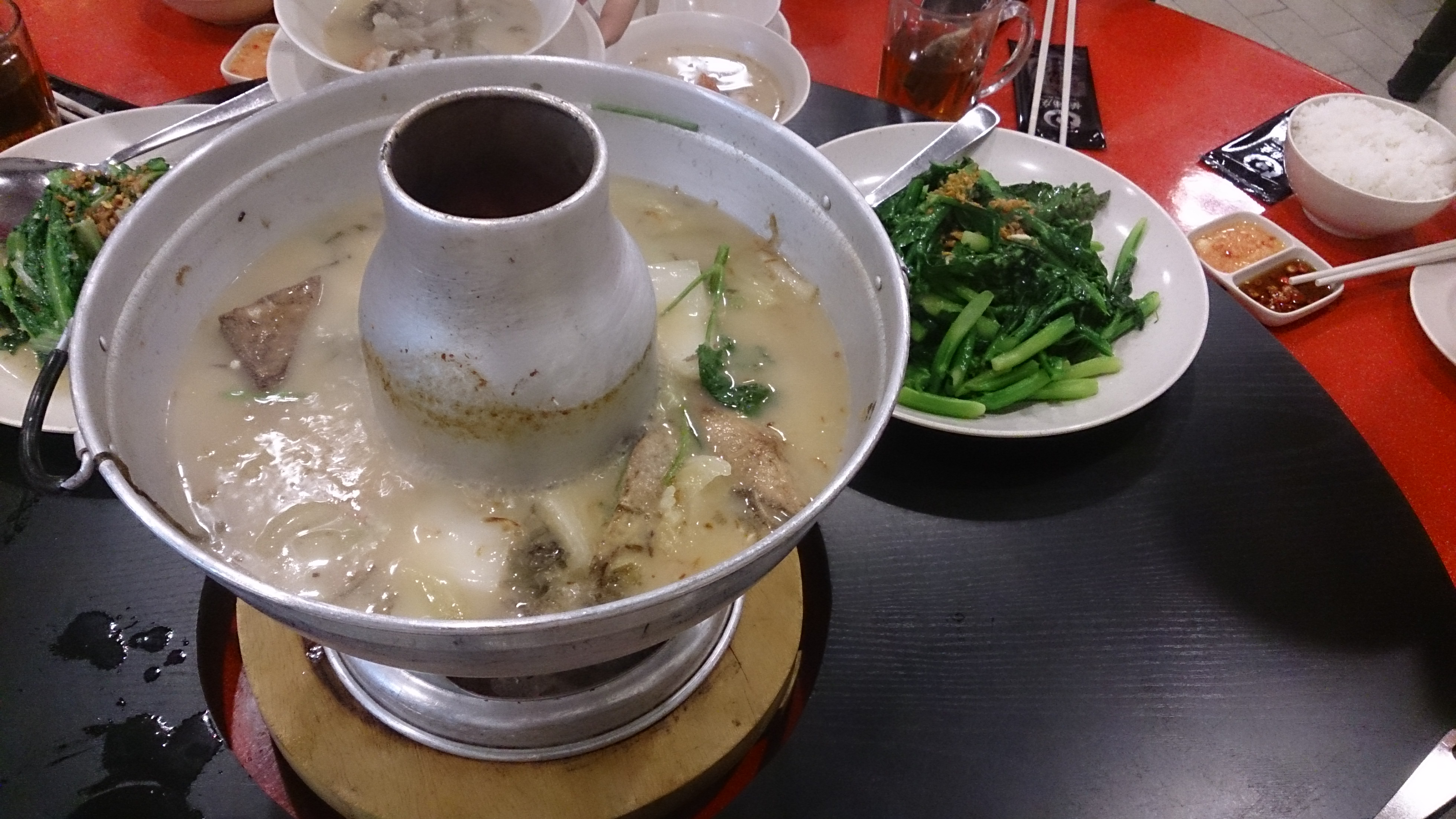
A traditional "chimney"-type hot pot

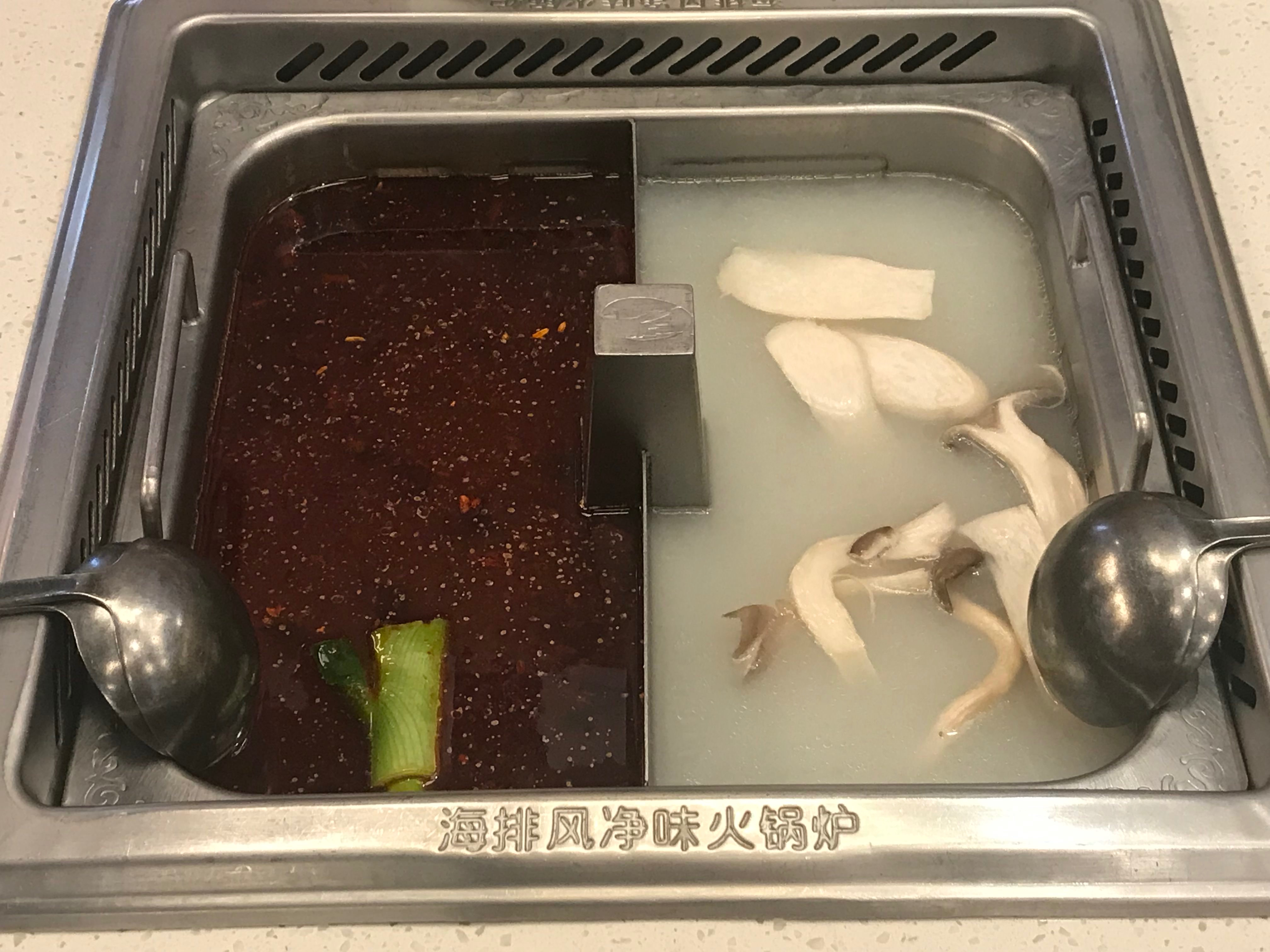
Hot pot with two flavors, built integrally into the dining table

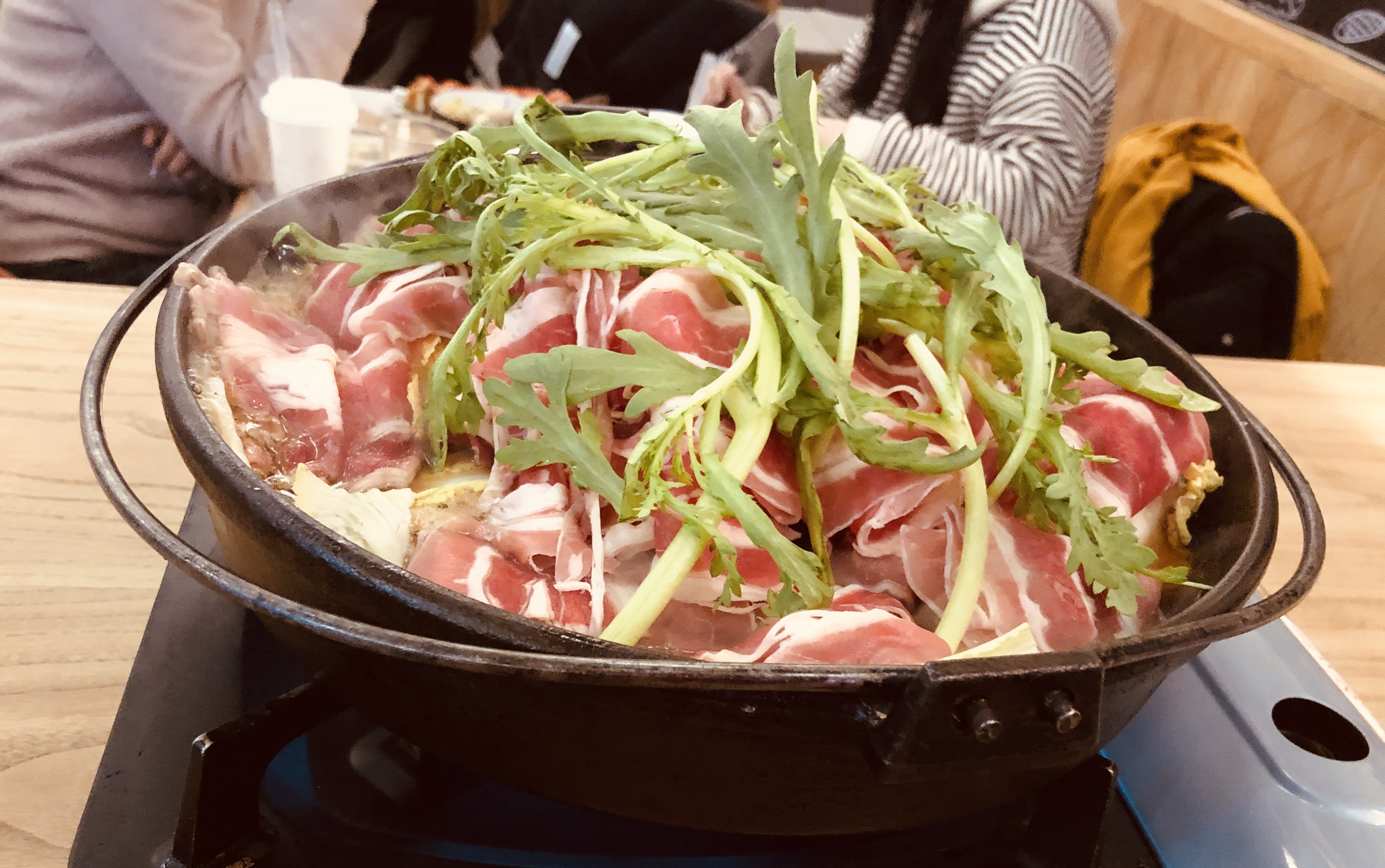
Hot pot from Yunnan, China

Hot pot is a type of broth traditionally served inside a large metal pot. There are many local varieties and styles of hot pot, such as Chongqing hot pot, Beijing hot pot, and Yunnan hot pot. The broth is brought to a boil and left simmering for the duration of the meal. Raw ingredients, such as meat and vegetables, are placed into the simmering broth and thus cooked. The cooked pieces are dipped into dipping sauces for additional flavor. Hot pot is considered a main course and may be served without rice or noodles on the side.

Typical hot pot ingredients include thinly sliced meat (typically mutton or beef), leaf vegetables, mushrooms, vermicelli, sliced potatoes, bean products, egg dumplings, tofu, and seafood. Raw ingredients are sliced into thin sections that will cook quickly and consistently in the simmering broth, which is kept at a gentle boiling temperature. Most raw foods can be cooked in a hot pot, although they may have different cooking times, and must be immersed in the soup and then removed accordingly. In turn, the various food items dipped in the hot pot provide additional flavour to the broth.

== History ==
The tripods of the Zhou dynasty may be the earliest prototypes of the hot pot. Diners among the nobility each had a personal pot made of bronze, called ran lu 燃爐. The main part of ran lu was a small stove with a small pot above burning charcoal. Later, a hot pot made with copper was created during the Three Kingdoms period (200–280 AD), which is generally acknowledged as the origin of the hot pot. During the Qing dynasty, hot pot became popular among the emperors. In particular, the Qianlong Emperor was very fond of hot pot and would eat it for almost every meal. Later, the Jiaqing Emperor had a banquet with 1,550 hot pots at his coronation. Empress Dowager Cixi was also known to have enjoyed hot pot with Chrysanthemum, especially during the winter season.

Since the 1990s, as the number of Chinese expatriates entering the United States has grown significantly, the popularity of Chinese food has also risen in the U.S. and hot pot has become globally recognized.

== Common ingredients ==
- Basic stock is often made using:
  - Water
  - Salt
  - Spices
- Meats and protein vary, and can include:
  - Thinly sliced lamb, goat, beef, sometimes pork, chicken, or other poultry
  - Whole or sliced fish
  - Shrimp
  - Clams and other bivalves
  - Beef balls
  - Fish balls
  - Shrimp balls and paste
  - Offal, especially beef tripe
  - Blood sausage
  - Crab
  - Lobster
  - Crayfish
  - Squid and other inkfish
  - Sea cucumber
  - Tofu, tofu skin, fu zhu, Japanese-style fish tofu, frozen tofu or fried tofu
  - Egg dumplings (蛋餃)
  - Fish cakes
  - Mantis shrimp
  - Quail eggs
  - Chicken feet
  - Ribs
- Starches include:
  - Glass noodles
  - Chinese noodles
  - Udon
  - Niangao
- Vegetables such as:
  - Bok choy
  - Napa cabbage
  - Crown daisy
  - Spinach
  - Lettuce
  - Carrots
  - Winter melon
  - Bean sprouts
  - Daikon
  - Potatoes and sweet potatoes
  - Varieties of mushrooms, such as straw mushrooms, enoki (金針菇), shiitake (香菇), and oyster mushrooms
  - Taro
  - Pumpkin
  - Watercress
  - Haidai (seaweed)
  - Cilantro
- Condiments:
  - Peanut butter
  - Sesame butter
  - Hoisin sauce
  - Soy sauce
  - Vinegar (white or black)
  - Cilantro
  - Minced garlic
  - Scallion
  - Sesame oil
  - Shacha sauce
  - Chili oil
  - Chive flower paste (韭菜花醬)
  - Fermented bean curd (腐乳)
  - White pepper
  - XO sauce
  - Douchi
  - Minced ginger
  - Chopped peanut

== Regional variations ==
=== East Asia ===
==== China ====
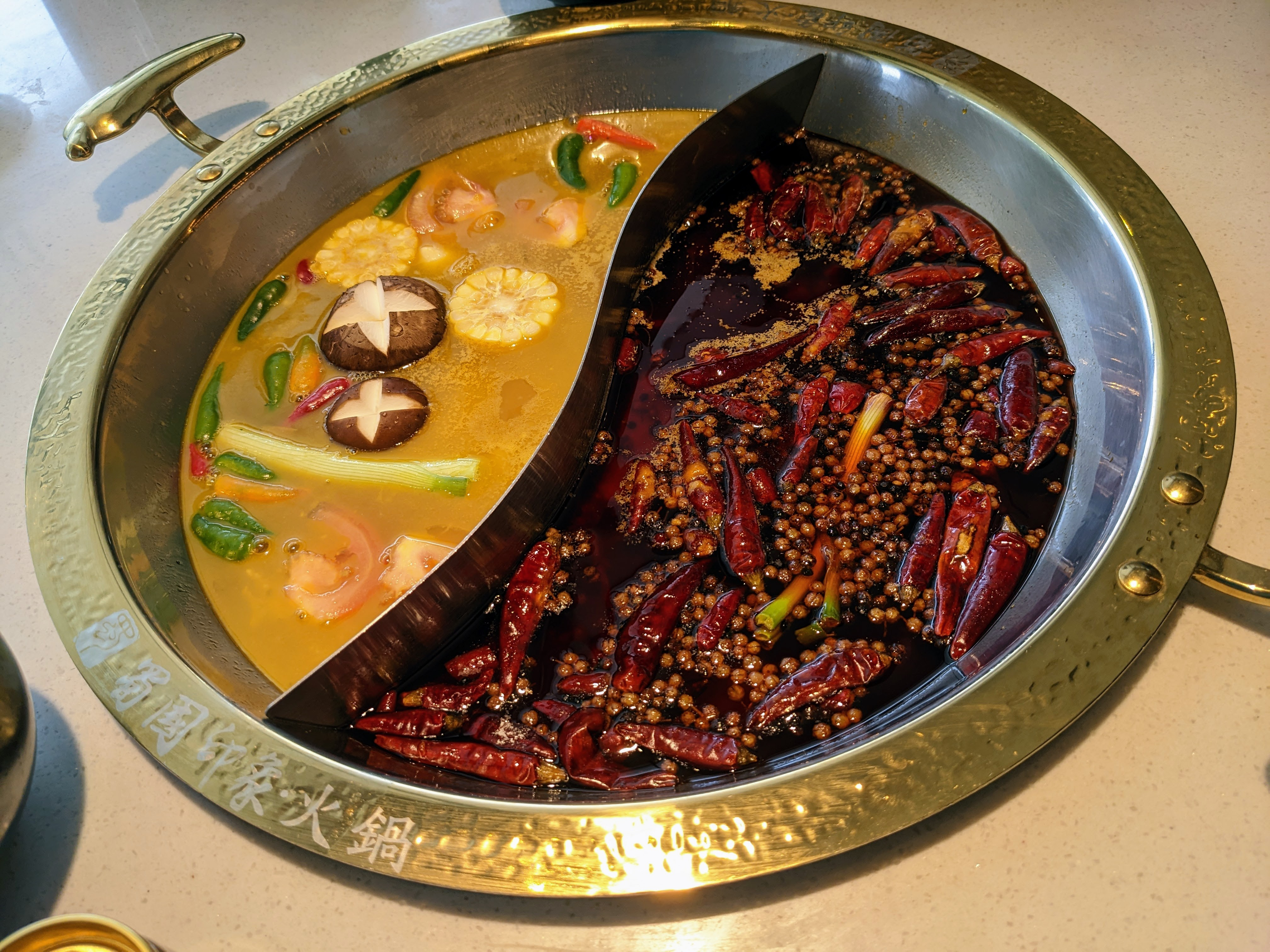
A Sichuan-style double hot pot with sour suan cai and spicy mala broths

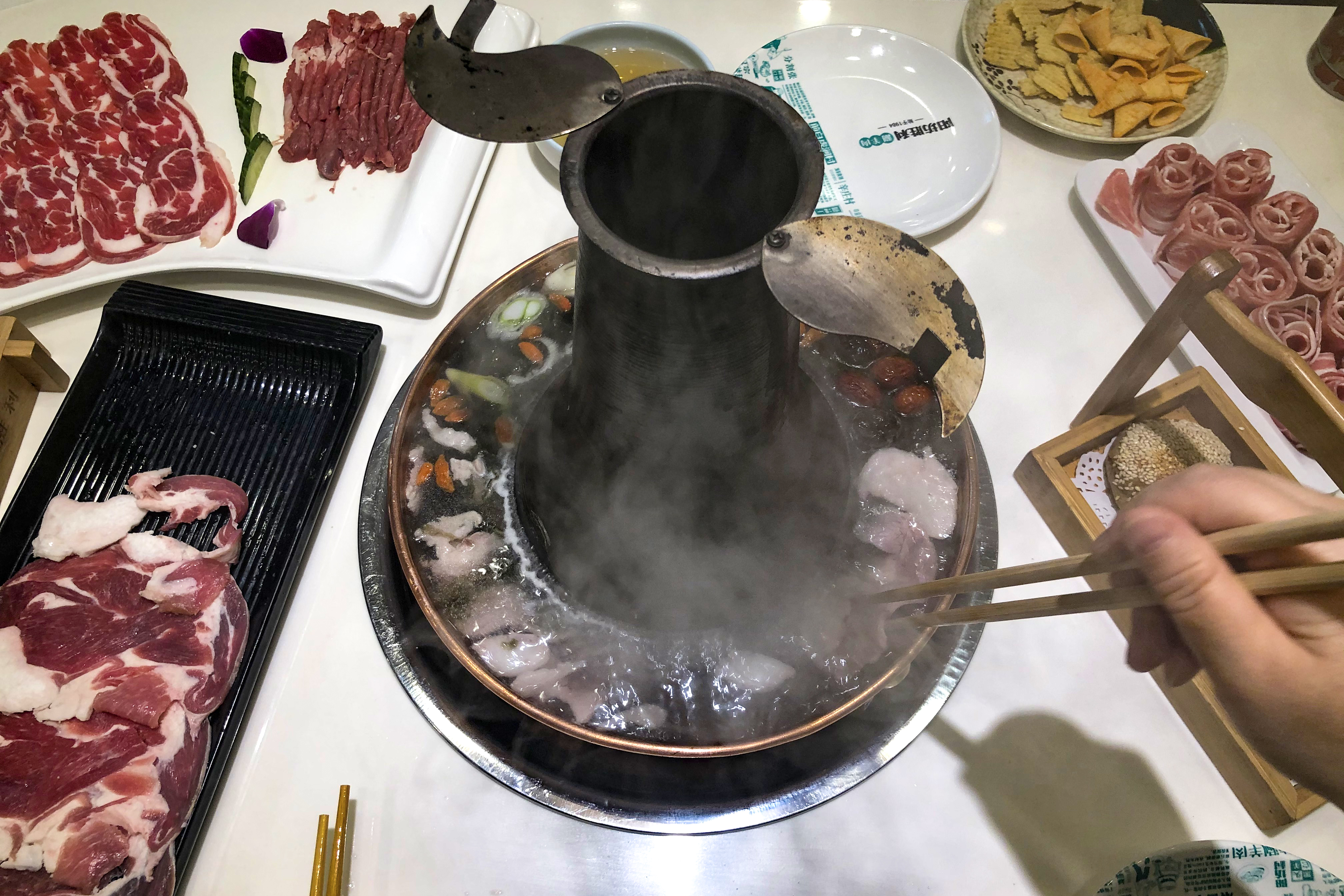
Instant-boiled mutton in Beijing

Chinese hot pots are often divided into "Southern style" and "Northern style", paralleling the northern and southern Chinese cultural divide. Although there are wide regional variations, in general, Southern styles tend to have spicy broths and complex dipping sauces, and are heavier on seafood, vegetables and mushrooms, while Northern styles are simpler and focus more on meat, particularly mutton.

According to research, 67 different spices and condiments are commonly used in traditional Chinese hotpot, involving 82 plant species of 50 genera in 26 families.

===== Northern styles =====
Instant-boiled mutton (Chinese: 涮羊肉; pinyin: Shuàn Yángròu) could be viewed as representative of "northern style hot pot", which focus on the main ingredients rather than the soup base. Water is used as the main ingredient of the hotpot instead of the flavored broth.

The Manchu hot pot (Chinese: 東北酸菜火鍋) uses plenty of suan cai (Chinese cabbage pickle) (Chinese: 酸菜; pinyin: suān cài) to make the broth sour.

In Hubei cuisine, hot pot is normally prepared with hot spices and Sichuan pepper. Items supplied to be cooked in this broth include mushrooms, thinly shaved beef or lamb, lettuce, and various other green vegetables.

===== Southern styles =====
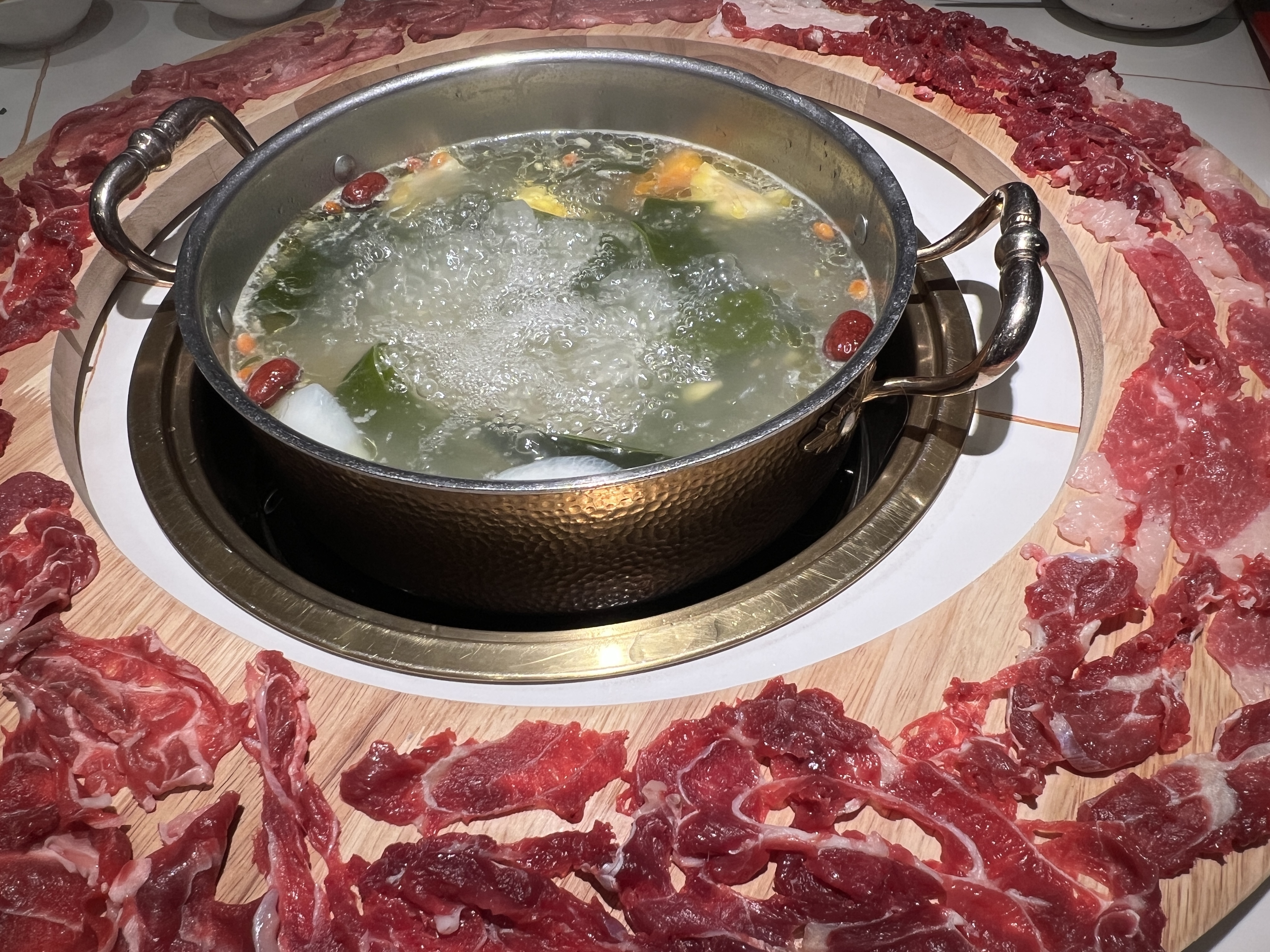
Chaoshan beef hotpot in Shenzhen, Guangdong, China

One of the most famous Southern variations is the Chongqing hot pot (Chinese:重慶火鍋), which uses mala seasoning flavored with chili and Sichuan pepper for a spicy and numbing flavor. Chongqing hotpots often feature a wide variety of different meats and ingredients, and offer many sauces and condiments to flavor the meat. The typical dipping sauce contains sesame oil and is mixed with crushed fresh garlic and chopped spring onions.

Sichuan also has a number of "dry" hot pots such as mala xiangguo (Chinese: 麻辣香鍋), which are similar to mala hot pot in ingredients and seasoning, but stir-fried instead of being cooked in broth.

In Yunnan, there is another predominant type of hot pot made with various mushrooms, wild or farmed. It is called the wild mushroom hot pot (Chinese: 野生菌火鍋). Due to the vast forests and abundant natural resources in Yunnan, people can find a wide variety of edible mushrooms. The easily accessible and fresh mushroom resources lead to the high popularity of the wild mushroom hot pot. The big difference between the mushroom hot pot and the spicy hot pot is that the former omits strong spice and chili, and the latter preserves the original flavor of the mushrooms. The mushroom hot pot is also seasonal, depending on the availability of local mushrooms.

A Cantonese variation includes mixing a raw egg with the condiments to reduce the amount of "heat" absorbed by the food, thereby reducing the likelihood of a sore throat after the steamboat meal, according to Chinese herbalist theories.

In Hainan cuisine, hot pot is generally served in small woks with a prepared broth containing pieces of meat. At the time of serving, the meat is not fully cooked, and approximately fifteen minutes are required before it is ready to eat. Items supplied to be cooked in this type of hot pot include mushrooms, thinly shaved beef or goat meat, lettuce, and other green vegetables. This dish varies somewhat in different parts of the province. Coconut water and juice is commonly added into the hot pot.

In Jiangsu and Zhejiang cuisine, chrysanthemum flowers are cooked in the broth to give it a floral essence.

In Teochew cuisine, a popular choice is Chaoshan beef hotpot (Chinese: 潮汕牛肉火锅) which originates from the Chaoshan region in Guangdong. Chaoshan beef hotpot is distinctively different from other Chinese hot pot styles due to its clear broth, which is typically made from beef bones and sometimes chicken. Chaoshan beef hotpot is served with roughly 7 cuts of beef and a variety of dipping sauces, most commonly a mixture of Shacha sauce, soy sauce, garlic, chili, and others.

==== Japan ====
In Japan, hot pots are known as nabemono. There are many variations, including sukiyaki, yosenabe, shabu-shabu, oden, and chankonabe.

The Chinese-style hot pot is transliterated as hinabe (火鍋, hinabe).

==== Korea ====
In Korea, jeongol and jjigae can be compared to hot pot. There are many variations, including budae-jjigae and kimchi-jjigae.

The Chinese-style hot pot is transliterated as hwogwo (火鍋, 훠궈).

==== Taiwan ====
In Taiwanese cuisine, it is very common to eat hotpot food with a dipping sauce consisting of shacha sauce and raw egg yolk with stir-fried beef(沙茶牛肉爐). One of the most authentic hotpot restaurants that locals widely praise is a hotpot restaurant called "Xiao Haozhou's sha-cha beef hot pot." This restaurant was founded in 1949 by a man named Musheng Chen. The popularity of this hot pot restaurant and its unique secret recipe of sha-cha sauce has become one of the iconic sha-cha sauce brands in Taiwanese cuisine nowadays. Initially, this hotpot is only assorted with a light broth and dip with sha-cha sauce. Influenced by Japanese cuisine, shacha sauce is now commonly served with raw egg yolk.

The Taiwanese also developed their own homegrown culinary sensibilities with a style of chili hotpot originated from the Szechuan chili hotpot style. In the Taiwanese style of chili hotpot, people who barely tolerate spicy favor are included. Rather than using animal offal as the main ingredient, the Taiwanese style of chili hotpot uses seafood and beef as their main ingredient due to Taiwan's location near the sea.

In Taiwan, people usually have a hotpot meal during the Lunar New Year's Eve. Different from the usual days of cooking hotpots with whatever ingredients they like, the Taiwanese follow the principles of the five elements when cooking the Lunar year Taiwan hotpot. They believe that by following the current principle of these five elements, then the food they eat can gain a "mutual generation sequence" (xiangsheng 相生) that is beneficial to the ones that eat them. In Taiwanese hotpot, these five elements are represented with the food in five colors: white, black, yellow, red, and green. Therefore, the five indispensable foods are

- stew turnip, which represents white;
- mushroom, which represents black;
- burdock or pumpkin, which represents yellow;
- carrot or tomato, which represents red; and
- reddish leaves, which represent green.

Moreover, locals believe that the more colors of ingredients in a hotpot, the more different nutrients they will gain from eating it. The reason why it is so crucial for Taiwanese people to consume hot pot during the lunar year is that hot pot not only represents rich nutrition and blessings for family health, but it also represents family reunion and harmony.

=== Southeast Asia ===
==== Cambodia ====
In Cambodian cuisine, hot pot is called yao hon (យ៉ាវហន) or chhnang pleurng (ឆ្នាំងភ្លើង, lit. 'pot fire'). It is usually eaten during celebrations or family gatherings. Just like the Chinese version, Cambodian hot pot consists of similar ingredients although the dish differs in that coconut milk is used as the base of the soup. Another variation of the dish is called "buttered yao hon" or "buttered chhnang pleurng"; the same ingredients are used but are instead cooked on a flat grill pan where butter is used as the base (this is similar to Korean barbecue). An herb sauce is usually added to "buttered yao hon", since the ingredients are not flavored by immersion in a broth.

==== Laos ====
In Lao cuisine, hot pot is called sin jum (ຊີ້ນຈຸ່ມ), which means dipped meat, although seafood is also a popular option. Sin jum is generally a leisurely meal enjoyed among family members at home, or among colleagues and friends in restaurants in cities across Laos. Usually, Lao style hot pots use the brown clay pots that are immediately evident in restaurants or stalls that serve the dish along the side of the streets. The broth is prepared from beef ribs, pork bones, or chicken combined with galangal, lemongrass, white onions, and cilantro roots, and sometimes with coconut water. Ingredients include a variety of fresh vegetables, such as water spinach, watercress, bokchoi, napa cabbage, mushrooms, glass vermicelli noodles. Thinly sliced marinated pork, beef, or chicken meat, seafood or eggs are protein source options. The condiments for a Lao hot pot normally include crushed chili and minced raw garlic, lime wedges, cilantro leaves and fish sauce. In the capital Vientiane, there are also numerous restaurants serving Japanese shabu-shabu and Korean and regional Chinese hot pots.

==== Philippines ====
In Philippine cuisine, hotpot is commonly served by Chinese specialty restaurants, and in some all-you-can-eat buffets. The terms shabu-shabu and "hotpot" are also used interchangeably for this style of food preparation.

==== Thailand ====
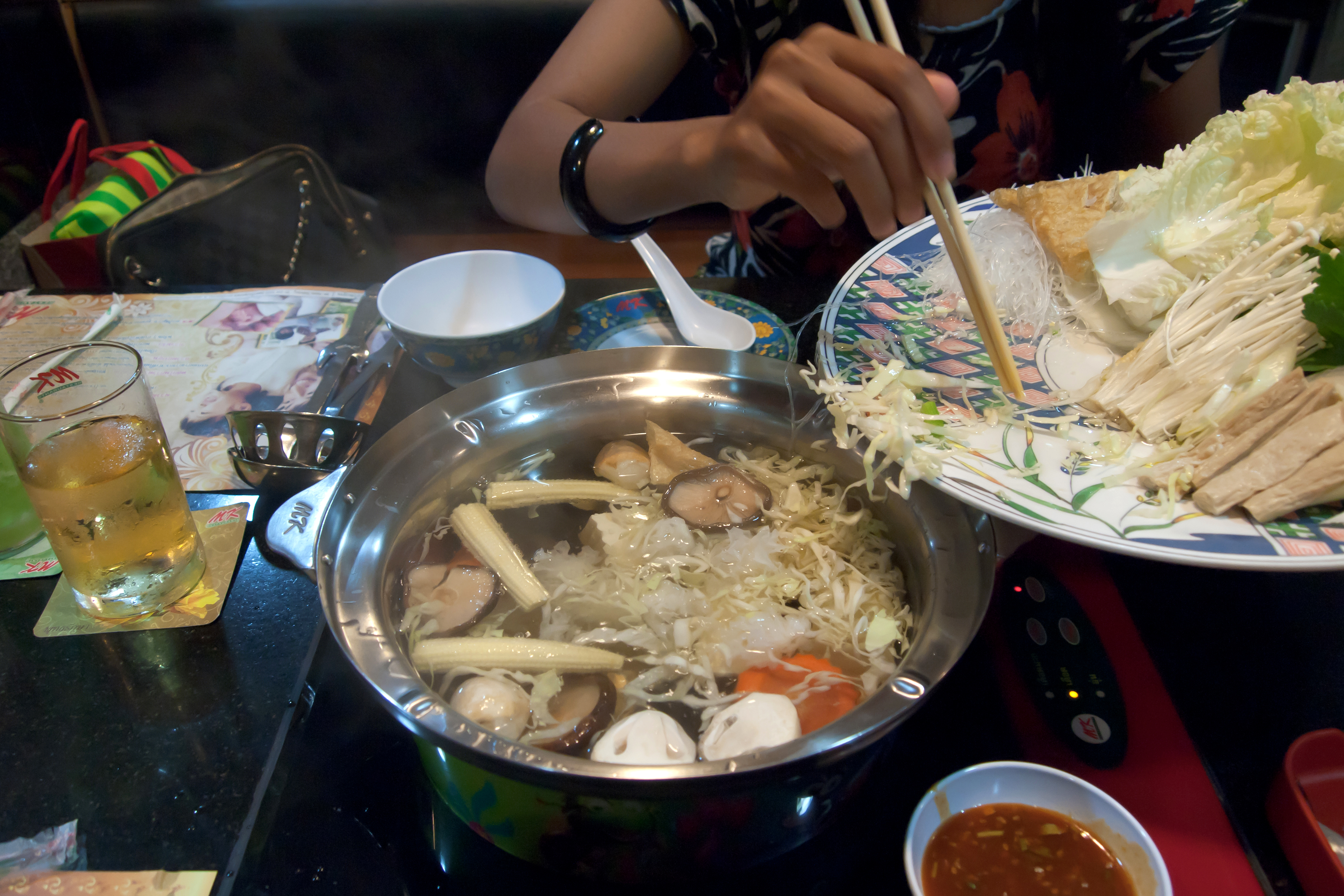
Thai suki, Thai hot pot preparation

In Thai cuisine, hotpot is called Thai suki, although it is quite different from the Japanese shabu-shabu variation called sukiyaki. Originally a Chinese-style hot pot, the number of ingredients to choose from was greatly increased and a Thai-style dipping sauce with chili sauce, chili, lime, and cilantro leaves was added. Another variation is mu kratha, the Thai hot pot which originated from Korean barbecue combined with Thai suki. In the Northeast region, a similar style of cooking called chim chum where thinly sliced meat is cooked in clay pots on charcoal stove is also popular. Tom yum is a common soup base for Thai hot pot.

==== Vietnam ====
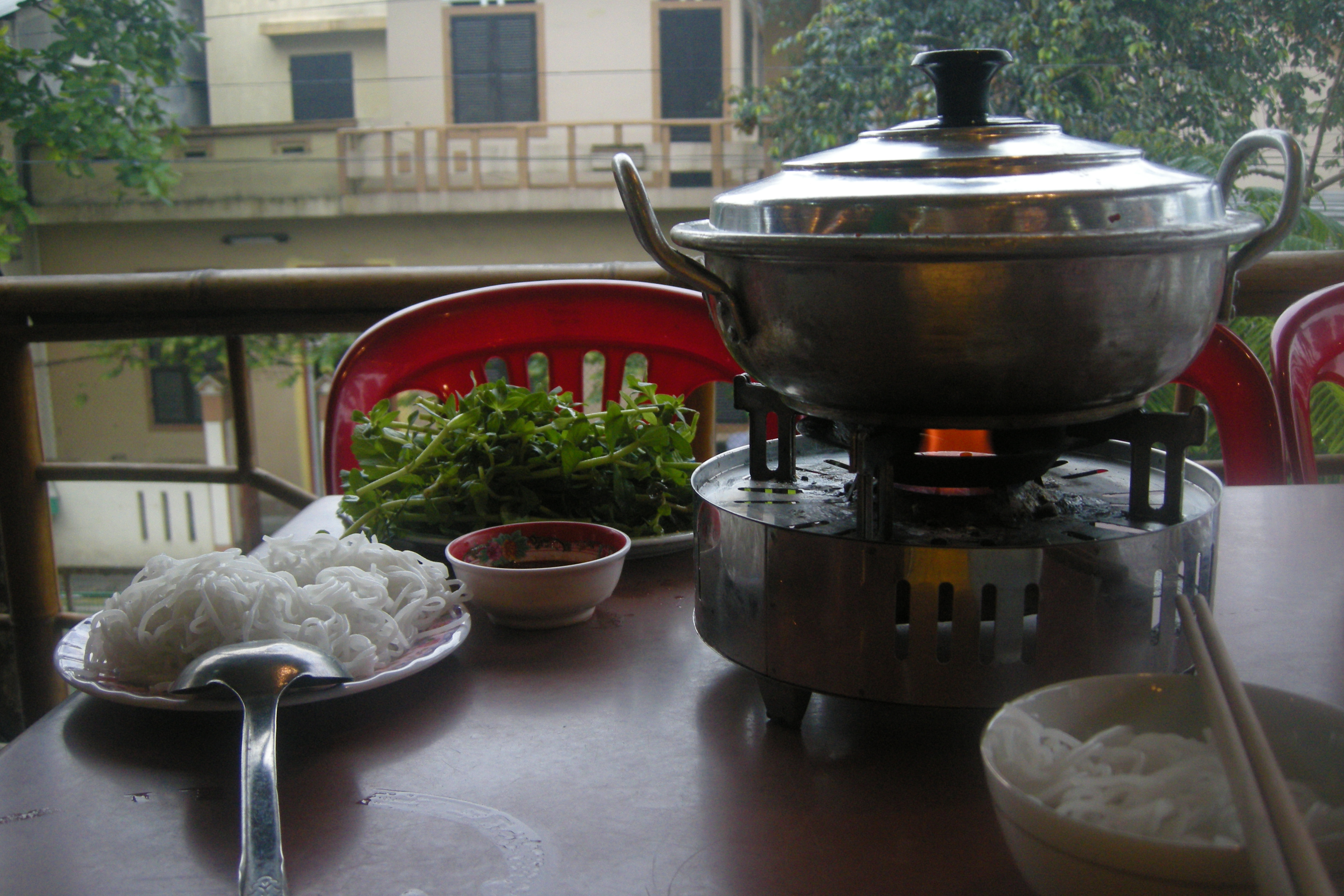
Soup set in Vietnam, hot pot style

In Vietnamese cuisine, a hot pot is called lẩu. There are many styles of lẩu ranging from seafood lẩu hải sản, canh chua soup-base (lẩu canh chua) or salted fish hot pot (lẩu mắm).

=== Europe ===
==== Switzerland ====
In Swiss cuisine, a variation of the traditional Chinese hot pot locally called fondue chinoise (lit. "Chinese fondue") is a popular Christmas meal. Various types of meat, fish and vegetables are boiled in a shared pot of broth. Various sauces and pickled condiments are provided on the side. After all the diners have finished cooking, they eat the now-well-flavored broth often combined with thin noodles.

==== Portable stoves ====
In many regions outside of Asia, hot pot is commonly enjoyed at home or in restaurants using small portable stoves placed at the dining table. These can include butane gas stoves, induction hobs, or electric hot plates, which provide a stable simmer throughout the meal and are convenient for both indoor and outdoor dining. Portable induction cookers in particular have gained popularity for hot pot, as they are energy-efficient, easy to clean, and safer to use in enclosed spaces compared to open-flame stoves.

== Similar dishes ==
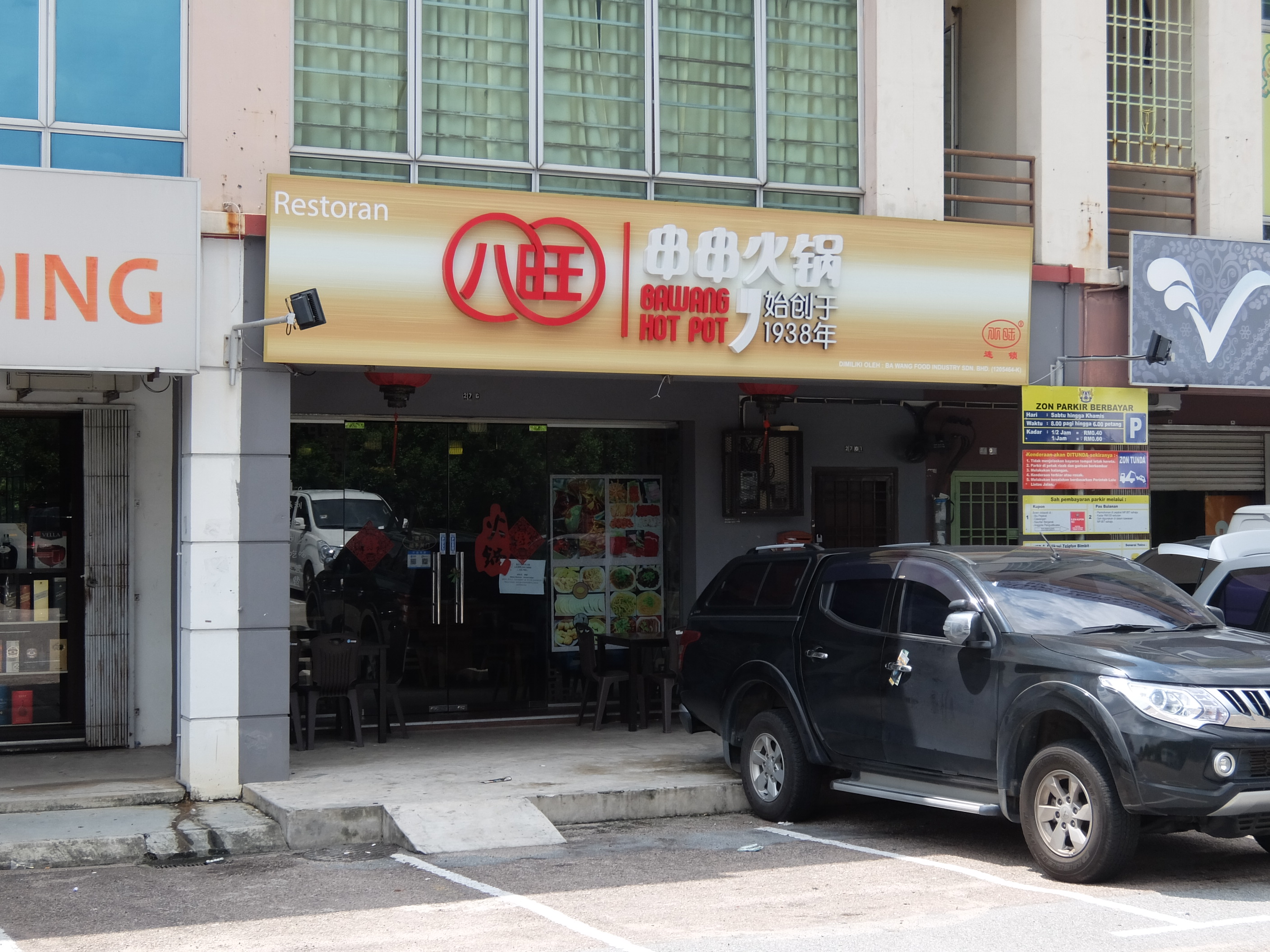
A hot pot restaurant in Johor, Malaysia

- Instant-boiled mutton
- Jeongol - Korea
  - Sinseollo
- Nabemono - Japan
  - Shabu-shabu
  - Sukiyaki
  - Oden
  - Chankonabe
- Yao hon (យ៉ាវហន) or chhnang pleurng (ឆ្នាំងភ្លើង) - Cambodia
  - Buttered chhnang pleurng
- Thai suki
- Mu kratha – also called "Thai hot pot" or mookata
- Clay pot cooking – referred to as "hot pot" or "hotpot" on Chinese restaurant menus in English-speaking regions
- Lancashire hotpot – a dish referred to as "hot pot" (or "hotpot") in Britain
- Stew – may include similar ingredients but is not necessarily cooked the same way
- Yong tau foo
- Fondue bourguignonne and fondue chinoise

== See also ==
- Buffet
- Fondue
- Raclette
- List of Chinese dishes
- List of stews
- Perpetual stew
- Slow cooker
