= Hikimi wasabi =

Variety of wasabi cultivated in Hikimi Town, Japan

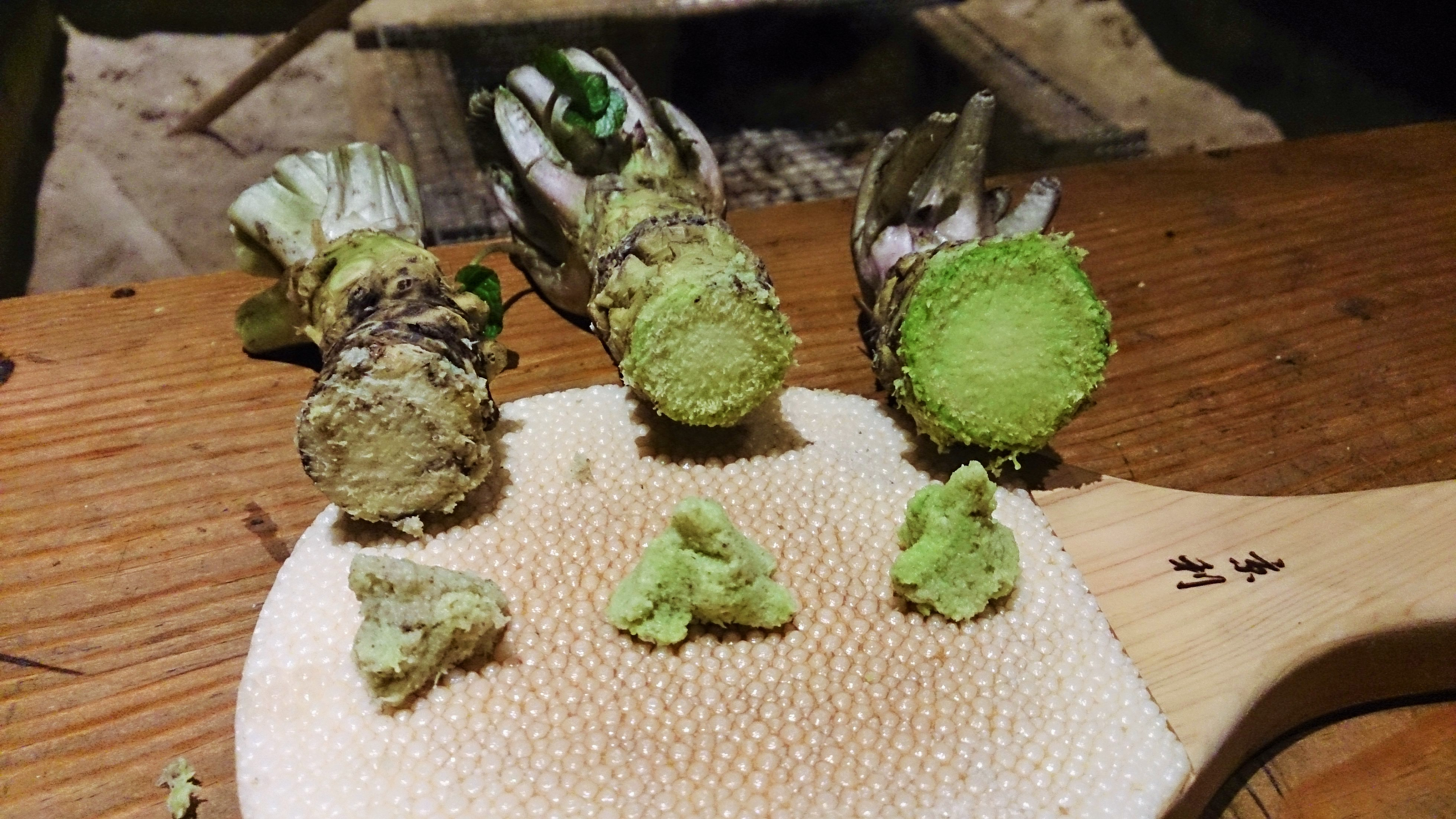
Evaluation of the color and flavor of grated Hikimi wasabi. From left, Hikimi wasabi (Daijin species), Hikimi wasabi (native species) and wasabi from Shizuoka Prefecture (Mazuma species). Each is a three-year-old root. Residents of the Kantō region (in eastern Japan) prefer deep green wasabi; whereas residents of the Kansai region (in western Japan) prefer light green or yellow wasabi.

Hikimi Wasabi (匹見ワサビ) is a variety of wasabi cultivated in Hikimi Town (now part of Masuda City), Shimane Prefecture, Japan.

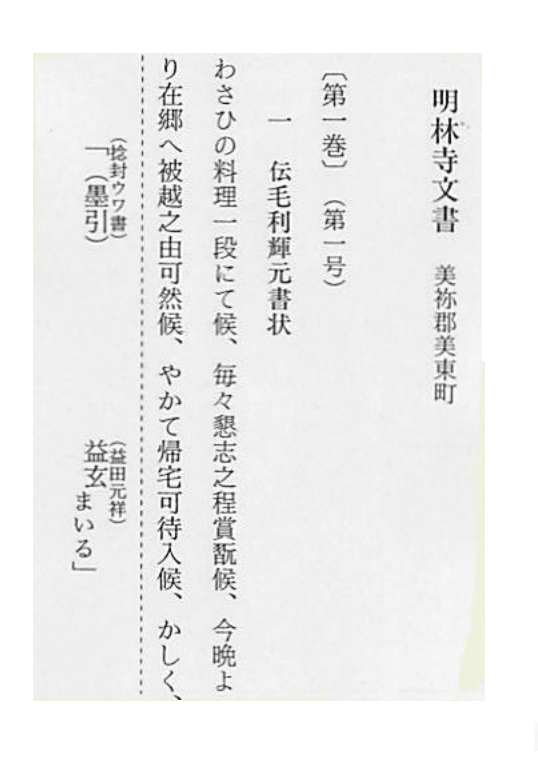
A replica of an old document, allegedly written by the feudal lord Mōri Terumoto (1553–1625). The document is preserved at Myōrinji temple in Yamaguchi Prefecture, and describes how Masuda Motonaga, the 20th feudal lord of the Masuda area, which included Hikimi, during the Edo period, entertained and impressed Mōri Terumoto with wasabi cuisine.

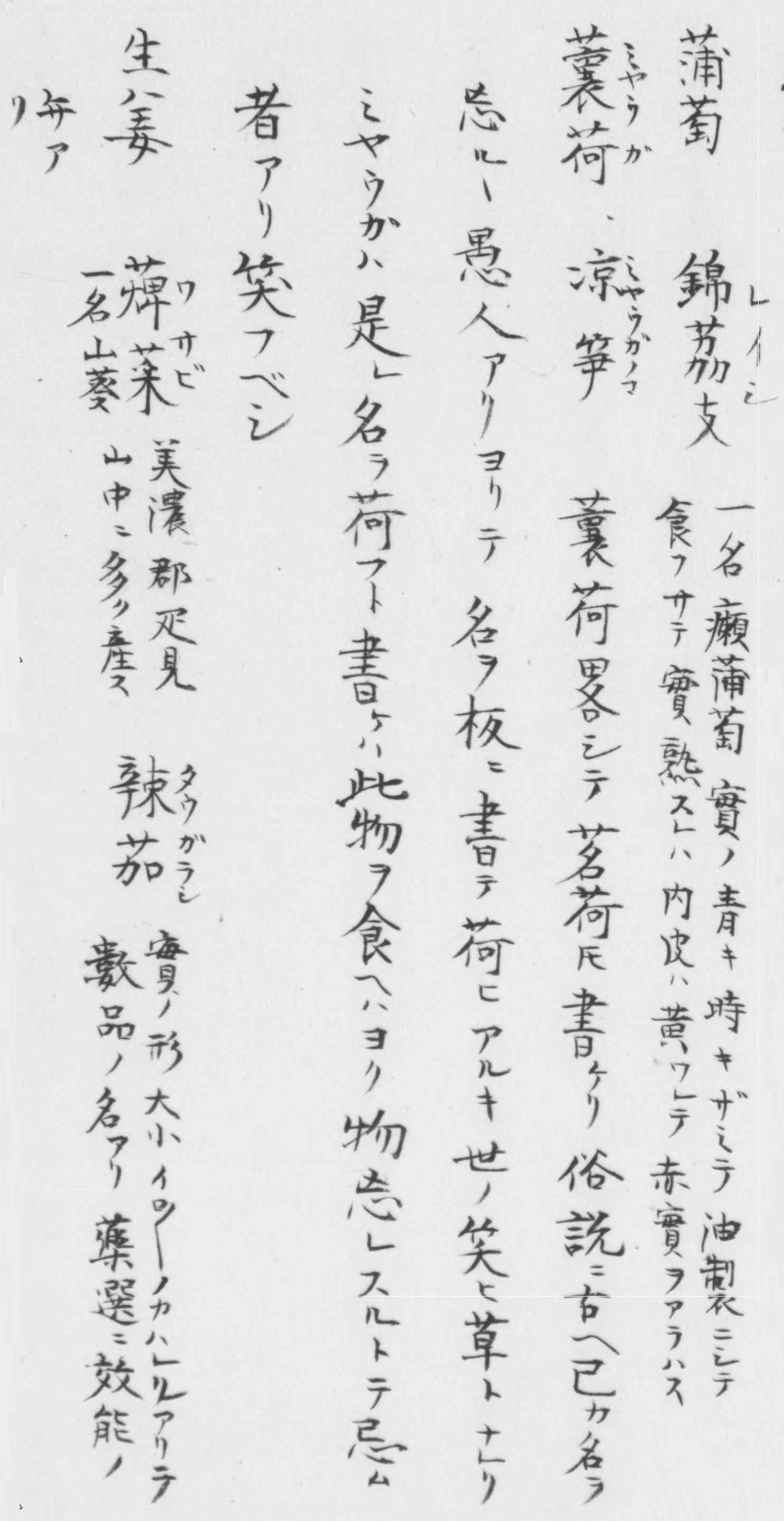
A replica of the Iwami Gaiki, which was compiled in 1820 by Nakagawa Akisuke, a scholar retained by a Hamada feudal lord. The original book is preserved at Mononobe Shrine, founded in the year 513, in Oda City, Shimane Prefecture. According to the description, wasabi was also called Yamaaoi, produced in the mountain area of Hikimi, and the book also refers to the pharmacological effects of wasabi.

Wasabi cultivation in Hikimi began in 1818 (Note: 1818 corresponds to the first year of the Bunsei era on the traditional Japanese calendar.) and by the early Shōwa era (1926–1989) reached an annual production of 300 metric tons (330.7 US tons). Of the wasabi from Shimane, 90% came from the town of Hikimi At the time, Shimane Prefecture was one of the top producers of wasabi in Japan. The two top areas of wasabi production were Shizuoka Prefecture in the East and Shimane Prefecture in the West. Hikimi's wasabi production declined due to numerous factors, including two large floods since the 1970s, recent generations of farming families choosing different careers, and global warming. In recent years, new residents of Hikimi have been attempting to revive the production of Hikimi wasabi. In 2013, Shimane Prefecture produced 74.5 metric tons of wasabi (70.2 metric tons were soil-grown wasabi, 4.3 metric tons were water-grown wasabi). That is fifth most in Japan, but far behind the top three prefectures: Shizuoka (867.6 metric tons), Nagano (604.7 metric tons), and Iwate (432.7 metric tons). Shimane Prefecture is known for its Hikimi wasabi. Due to this small amount, Hikimi wasabi is now considered to be fairly rare.

== Climate ==
Japan, except for the Hokkaido region, is in the subtropical high-pressure belt, a unique area in the world rich in water despite being located at a latitude which often is desert. When winter comes, rainfall often turns into snowfall, and the Japan Sea side of the main island Honshū has one of the highest amounts of snow at that latitude or lower in the world. Hikimi is located in the southwestern tip of this heavy snow fall area in Japan. Snow acts as insulation to help protect wasabi from frost during the winter. Snow also functions as a natural dam, keeping water plentiful, which is good for growing wasabi. Hikimi is also humid and, being in the mountains, has fewer daylight hours throughout the year. A species native to Japan, wasabi was originally distributed mainly around the Japan Sea side of Honshū. It grows much better in areas with high humidity and short daylight hours than in areas with strong sunlight and high temperatures. With all these favorable factors existing in Hikimi, wasabi grows naturally and has been used by the local people since before it was farmed In terms of climate, Hikimi is the best place for wasabi cultivation, but there are concerns about the future of wasabi production in Hikimi. It is said that the average global rise in temperature is 0.68 °C per 100 years (1.22 °F), but the temperature of Hikimi rose 1.1 °C (1.98 °F) in the past 100 years. This means that ideal conditions for wasabi cultivation rose 200 meters in that time, since temperatures decrease at a rate of 0.55 °C per 100 meters. In the past, top-quality wasabi could be harvested even in the lower areas. However, the water temperature gradually has been rising since World War II, and the warmer temperatures have resulted in more damage to the crops from insects. Some farmers are trying to avoid disease and pests by farming fields at higher elevations, but soon they will run out of land to move up to. Moreover, on the Japan Sea side, in recent years there have been torrential rainstorms at a scale never seen before. These large storms wash away wasabi plants and sometimes devastate entire farms.

== Cultivation ==
=== Water-grown cultivation ===
In Hikimi, water-grown wasabi is commonly grown on farms in the Keiryū style (渓流式, keiryū-shiki, "mountain–stream style"). The water comes from the Takatsu River system, which is one of the cleanest rivers in Japan. The Tatami-ishi style (畳石式 tatami-ishi-shiki, "paving-stone style") is the main style used in Shizuoka, and the Heichi style (平地式 heichi-shiki, "flatland style") in Nagano. These use spring water as a source and are usually constructed on a large scale using heavy machinery in easily accessible locations. On the other hand, Keiryū-style fields use water mainly from mountain streams. The fields are built on a small-scale by hand along mountain streams, making full use of the natural features of the landscape. To access the Keiryu Style fields, people need to be excellent mountain hikers, because the fields are located in difficult to access places

=== Water-grown wasabi traits ===
==== Slow growth ====
Slow growth owes to Keiryū-style cultivation being exceedingly connected to the natural environment. The temperature of spring water (ground water) has little variation year-round. On the other hand, mountain stream water is always exposed to the elements, so the temperature is easily affected by the outside temperature. For that reason, the water temperature in Keiryū-style farming changes significantly according to the season. The water temperature range to grow wasabi is as narrow as 8 to 18.6 °C (the ideal temperature is 12 to 13 °C), and growth stops if it is higher or lower than that. Therefore, water-grown wasabi in Keiryū-style fields goes through periods of growth and rest similar to annual growth rings on trees.

==== Flavor and appearance ====
The flavor and appearance of Hikimi wasabi are described as:

1. Mild sweetness spreading after a sharp pungent flavor
2. Rich in aroma and with a viscous texture
3. Grated color is light green. (Native species are mostly yellow or white.)

Regarding this sweetness, Hoshi Norimitsu, a former executive chef of the Hotel Okura, stated: "Hikimi Wasabi is not only posses a strong pungency, but also contains sweetness in the sharpness. I think it is because Hikimi wasabi spends time in snow. Well ... people have said for years that Japanese radish (daikon) which is preserved in the snow is sweeter. Wasabi is the same."

The viscosity of wasabi is believed to help retain pungency and flavor compounds after being grated, and keeps its quality longer. At the same time, wasabi goes well as a sushi topping or in a sushi rice ball. For example, watery sushi toppings such as herring roe or abalone easily slide from a sushi rice ball, but wasabi makes sushi toppings hard to slide down. Viscous Hikimi wasabi works especially well.

Regarding the color of grated wasabi, residents of Tokyo prefer the deep green wasabi produced in Shizuoka Prefecture, whereas residents of the Keihanshin region (the Kyoto–Osaka–Kobe area) prefer the light green wasabi produced in Shimane Prefecture. The largest company of processed wasabi manufactures and sells two different colors of powdered wasabi for business use. One is the western Japan style, and the other is eastern Japan style. The western Japan style of wasabi is lighter colored than wasabi from eastern Japan.

=== Farm-grown cultivation ===
Farm-grown wasabi is mainly grown on the slopes of forests where broad-leaved trees grow. The broad-leaf trees naturally adjust the sunlight suitable for growth of wasabi by blocking strong sunlight in the summer, and allowing weak sunlight through after the leaves fall in the winter. The fields are made at various altitudes from 250 meters to 1100 meters above sea level. By farming at different altitudes at the same time, farmers can harvest over a wider period of time.

=== Revival efforts ===
To revive wasabi cultivation in Hikimi, the following institutions and measures are being conducted.

Wasabi Bio-center
This institution produces seedlings of elite breeds. It is located at the former site of the branch in Hikimi. This institution is equipped with an air-controlled laboratory, a breeder room with various equipment, and equipment to keep bacteria out.
Wasabi College Hikimi
This approach is planned and sponsored by the local administration with the aim of getting people interested in agriculture and rural life, finding new farmers, and promoting settlement. Some participants of the college moved to Hikimi to farm.

=== Gallery ===
Growing Hikimi Wasabi

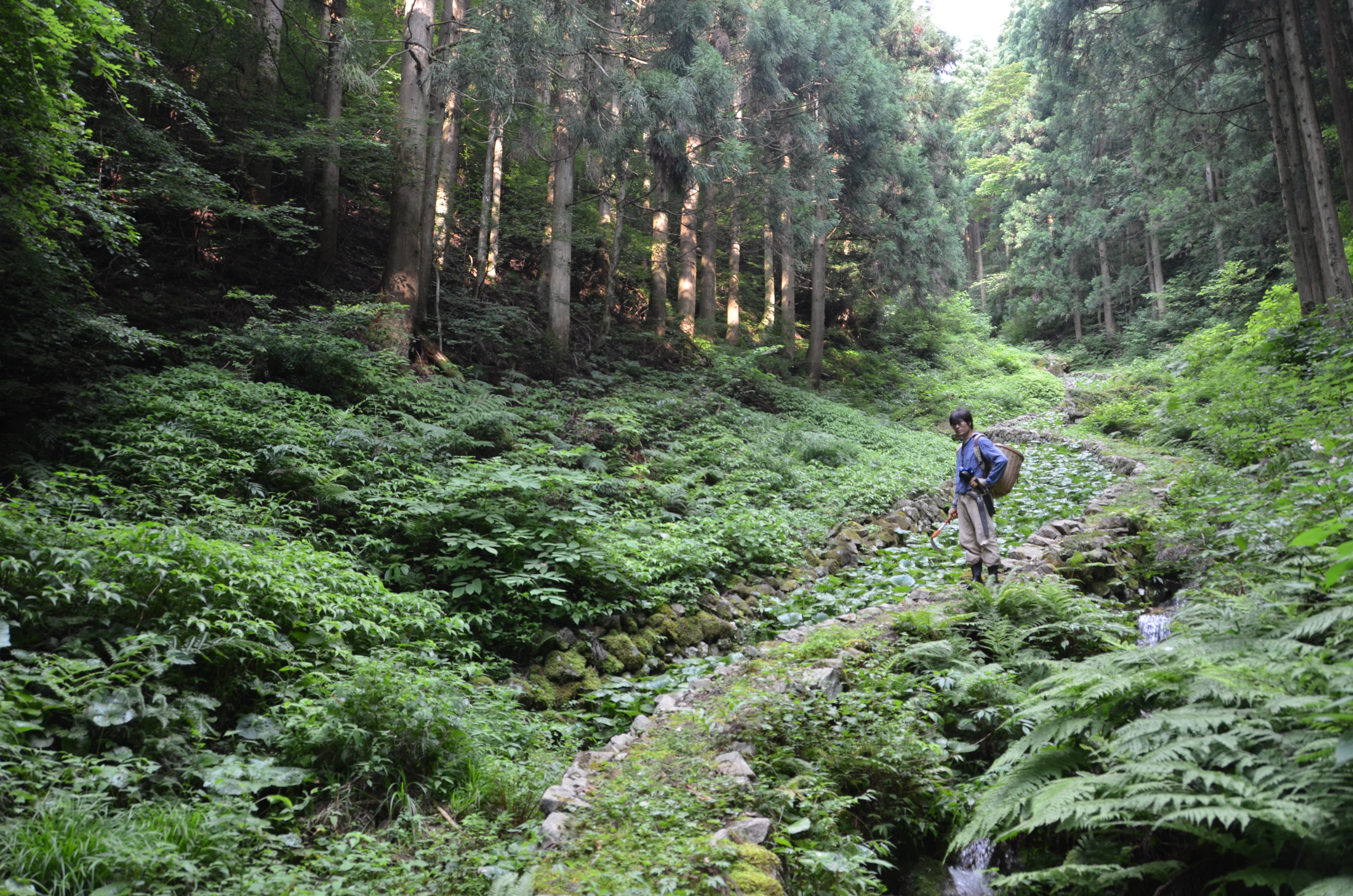
Keiryū-style fields. This style is widely used around the Chūgoku Mountains: Shimane, Yamaguchi, Hyogo, Okayama, and Hiroshima Prefectures. It is therefore also called the Chūgokusankei system. The fields are made along mountain streams using the natural geographical features.

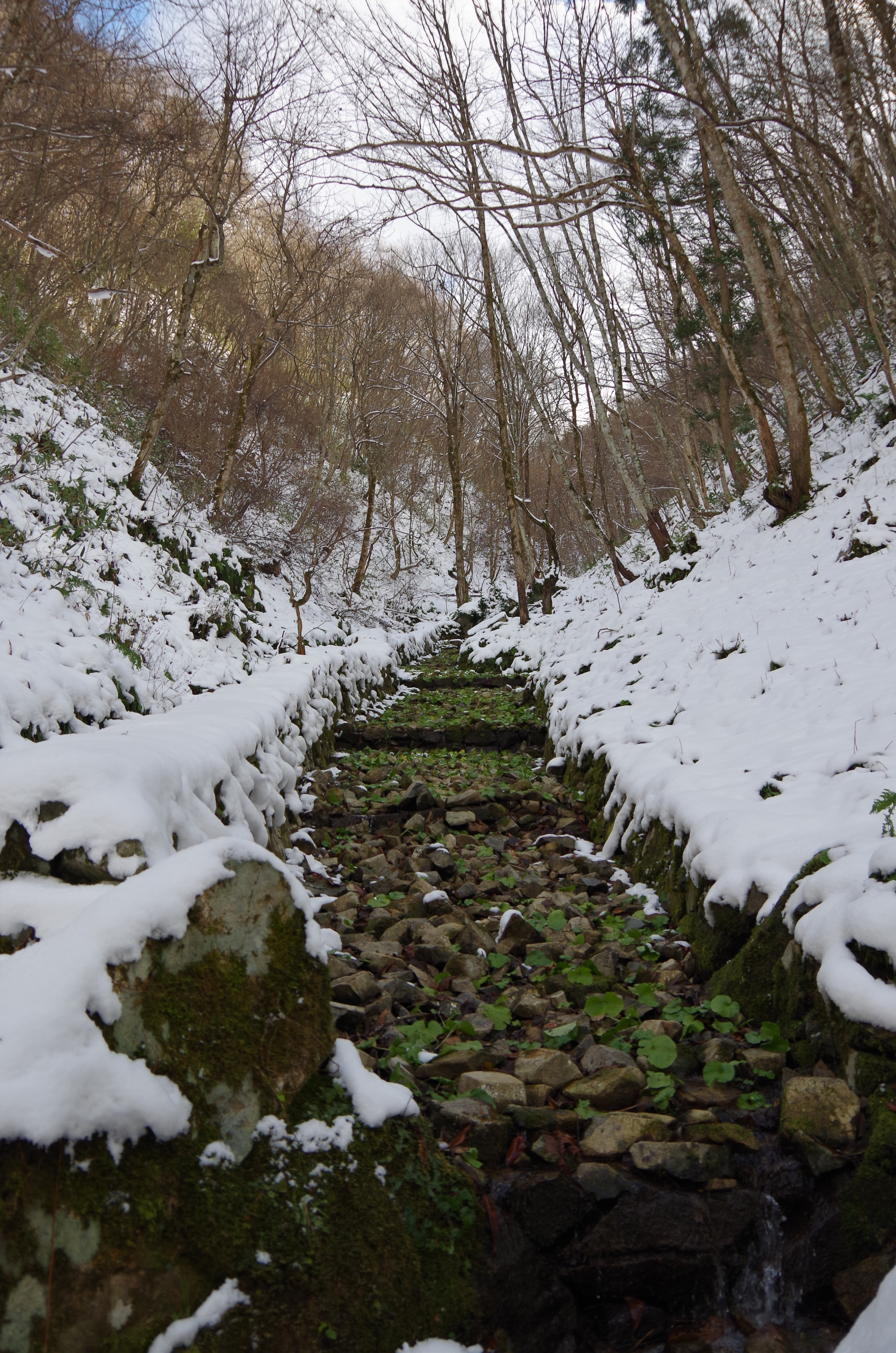
When it snows, flowing water usually melts the snow, but sometimes the fields are covered with snow.

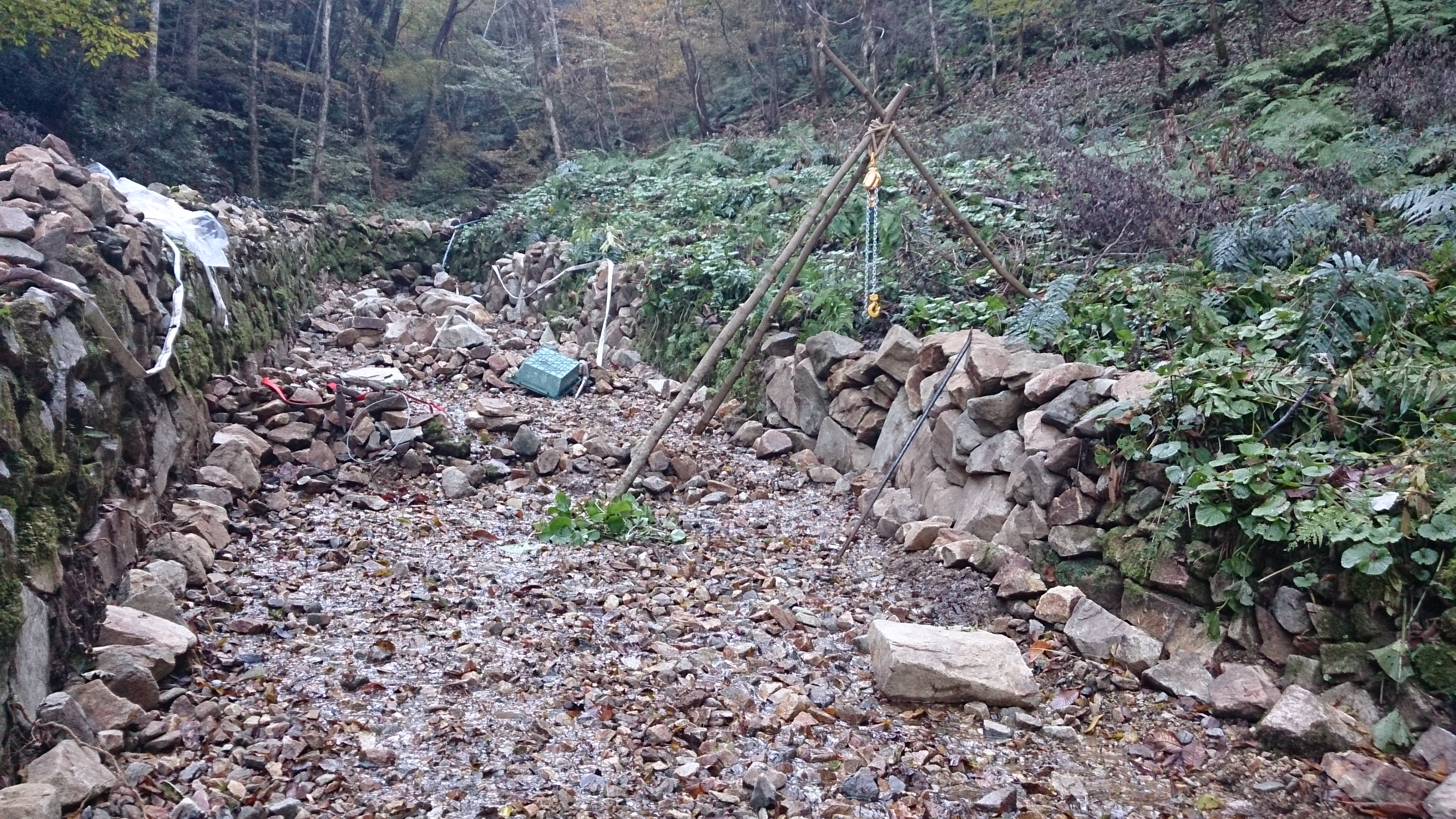
Repairing Keiryū-style wasabi fields. The fields are mostly located in places heavy machinery cannot access, so farmers usually maintain the fields by hand.

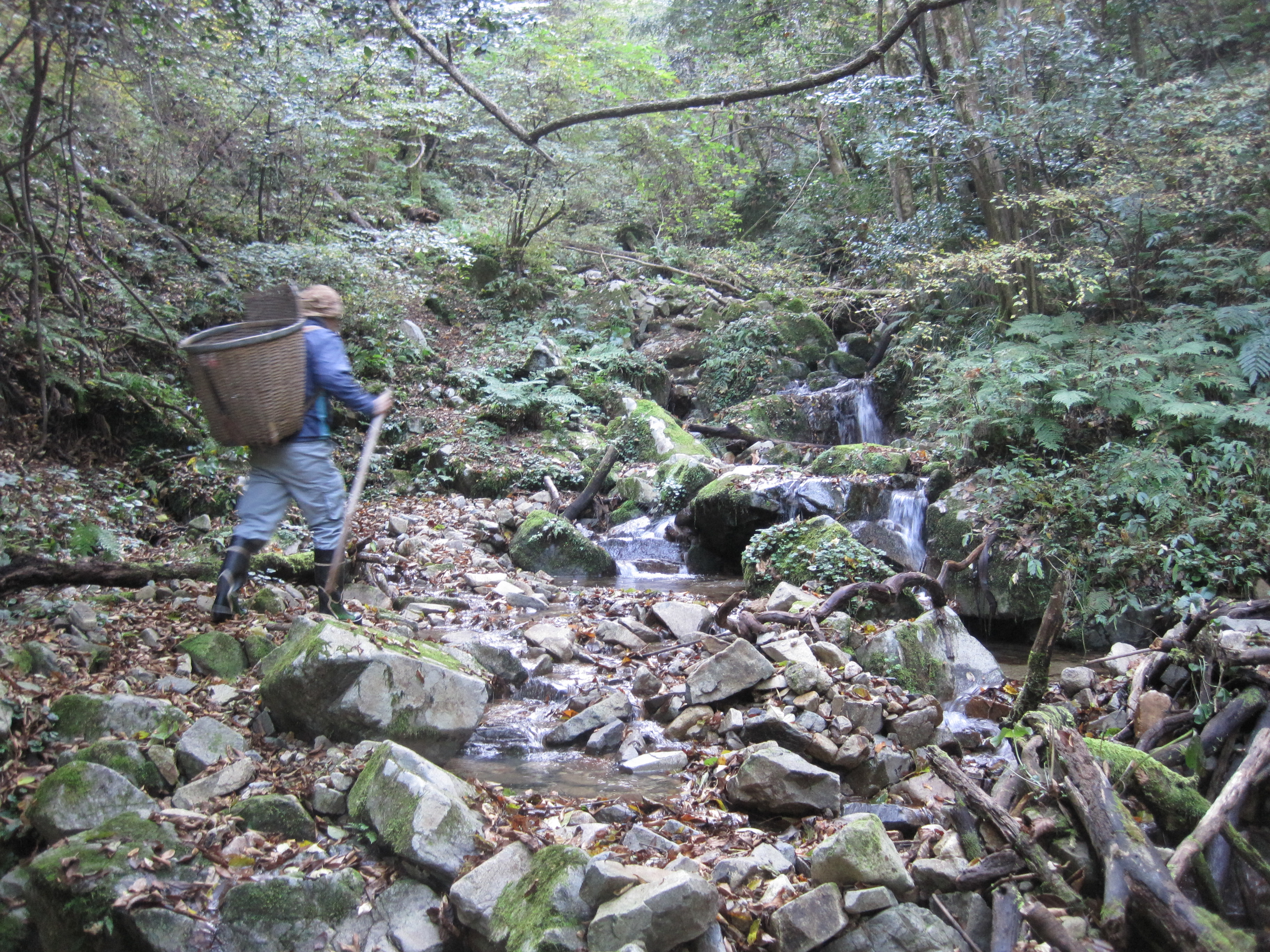
A farmer going to his wasabi fields to harvest. He sometimes must walk more than one hour to reach the fields on rough slopes of mountain trails along the valley. All he brings is a basket to carry the harvested wasabi.

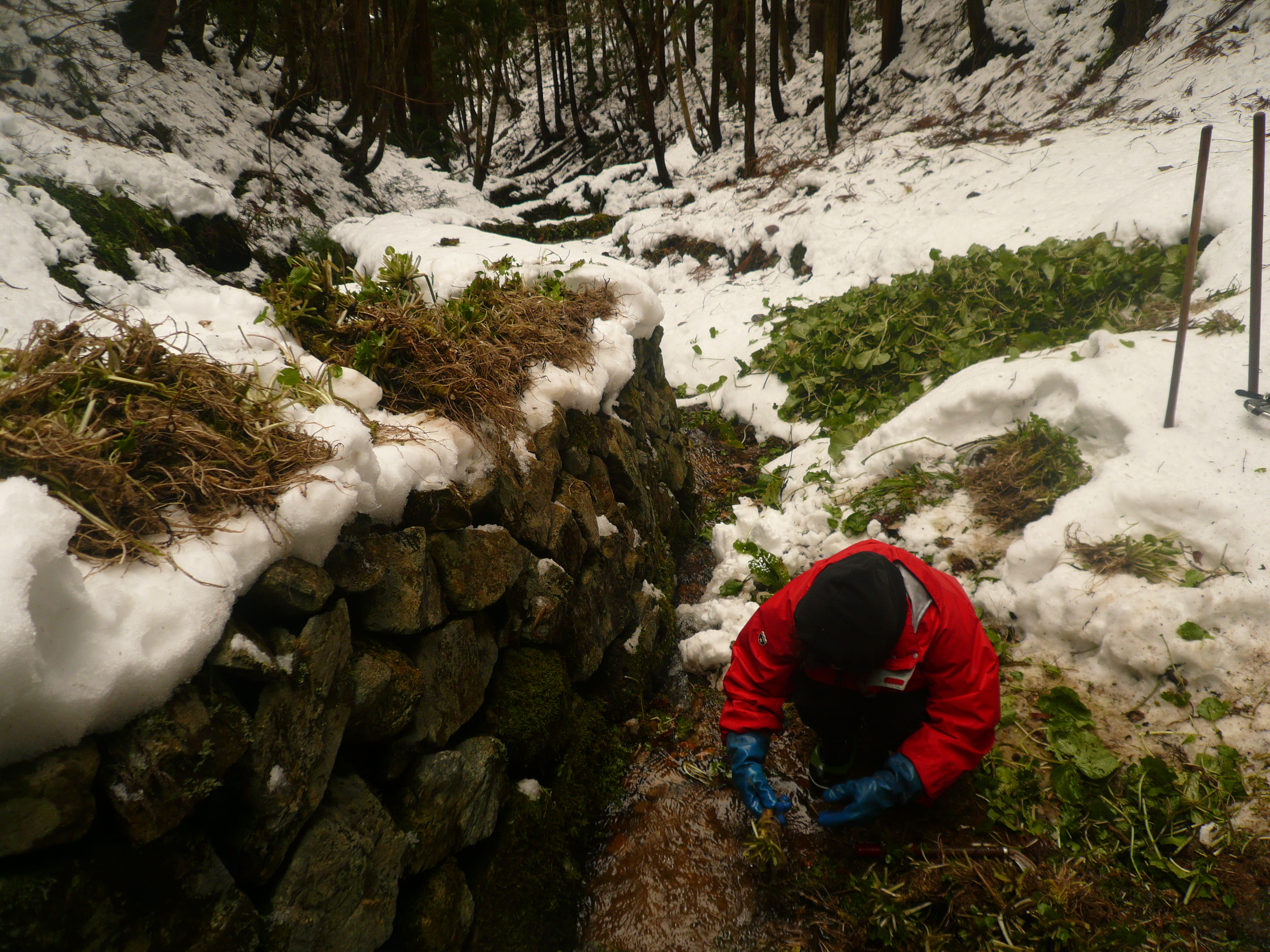
A farmer's wife, helping her husband to harvest Hikimi wasabi. Her husband digs up wasabi, and she prepares them for shipment.

== Breed varieties ==
Shimane No. 3 is one of the main breed varieties and is cultivated in both water fields and soil fields. Shimane No. 3 was developed by Dr. Yokogi Kuniomi of Shimane Prefecture's Agricultural Experiment Station with the cooperation of Kenjirō Tanaka, a farmer in Nichihara Town (now part of Tsuwano Town) in 1942. It is the only superior variety found to be resistant to the putrefaction disease which destroys wasabi cultivation, and it saved the wasabi industry in Shimane Prefecture. For water-grown wasabi only, in addition to local species native to Hikimi, there is Daijin, which is bred from native varieties from elsewhere in Japan. Misawa, which was developed in 2002, is used for soil-grown wasabi only.

== Processed products ==
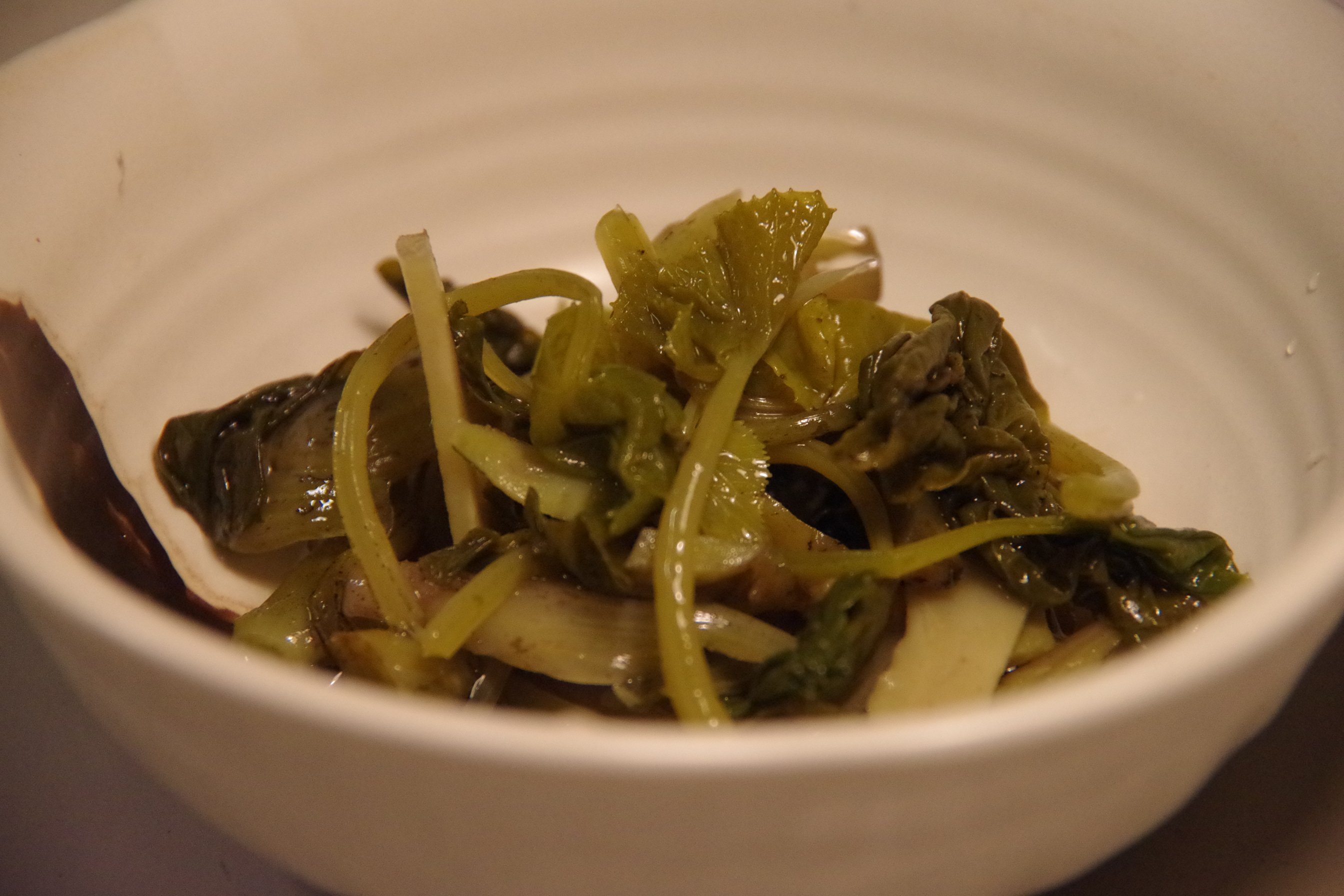
Shōyu-zuke (pickled vegetables in soy sauce). Carefully selected shoots of wasabi. Only those with a good texture are used for shōyu-zuke. The shoots of wasabi are known to locals as ganime and treated as a luxury ingredient.

Processed products of water-grown wasabi include additive‐free wasabi paste, Japanese yam paste mixed with wasabi, sausages containing wasabi, and other things. Soil-grown wasabi is used mainly to make wasabi paste. Soil-grown wasabi's leaves, stems, and flower parts are also used as ingredients of pickled products such as shōyu-zuke (soy sauce pickles), sakekasu-zuke (pickles in sake lees), miso-zuke (miso pickles), and sweets such as ice cream and pudding. Wasabi shoots (known locally as ganime) with good texture are used especially for shōyu-zuke.

== Culture ==
=== Yamaoi-Tengu-Sha shrine ===
Yamaaoi-Tengu-Sha shrine is the only shrine dedicated to wasabi in which wasabi farmers pray for a good harvest in Japan. The shrine is located halfway up Mount Daijingataki, 1170 meters (3838 feet) above sea level, in the town of Hikimi, Mikazura District. This town is regarded as the birthplace of Hikimi Wasabi. The shrine's goshintai (object of worship) is a carved tengu with a round fan dedicated to the shrine.

=== Wasabi Kagura ===
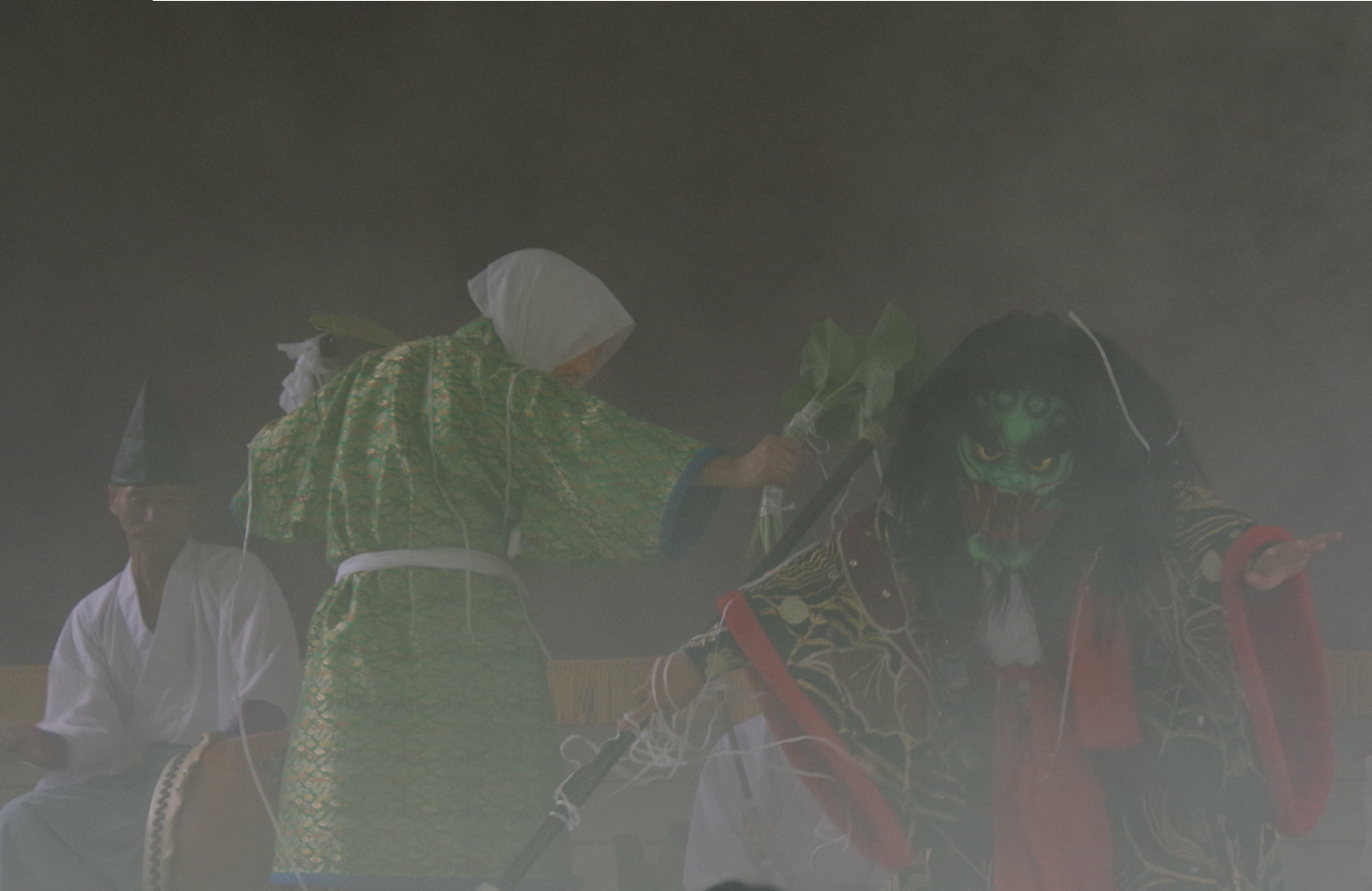
Kagura being performed at the Wasabi Shrine. The title of this performance is Yamaaoi Tengu, and it is well known as a Wasabi Kagura. A demon, an anthropomorphized form of disease and some insects, attacks a wasabi farmer in one of the scene. These days, smoke is also used to be more dramatic. A crow-billed goblin slays the demon, and the story comes to a happy ending.

Iwami Kagura is a traditional performance art of western Shimane Prefecture. In modern times, a Kagura play has been created by locals to pray for a good wasabi harvest. Nishida Tamotsu created the wooden masks. Watanabe Tomochiyo, who is a researcher of Iwami Kagura and ethnology, created the words, and the Mikazura Kagura Preservation Society, all members of which are wasabi farmers, created the choreography. The title "Yamaaoi Tengu" was named after the official name of the Wasabi Shrine. The performance was first performed at the Shrine on June 5, 1983. The Wasabi Kagura has continued to be performed since then. The story goes that a tengu, an object of worship of the shrine, slays disease and insects (in anthropomorphized forms) to save suffering wasabi farmers.

The story is performed by members of the Mikazura Kagura Preservation Society. The group has been designated as a Shimane prefectural intangible folk cultural property. The story is performed at a unique Rokuchōshi tempo.

=== Uzume-meshi ===
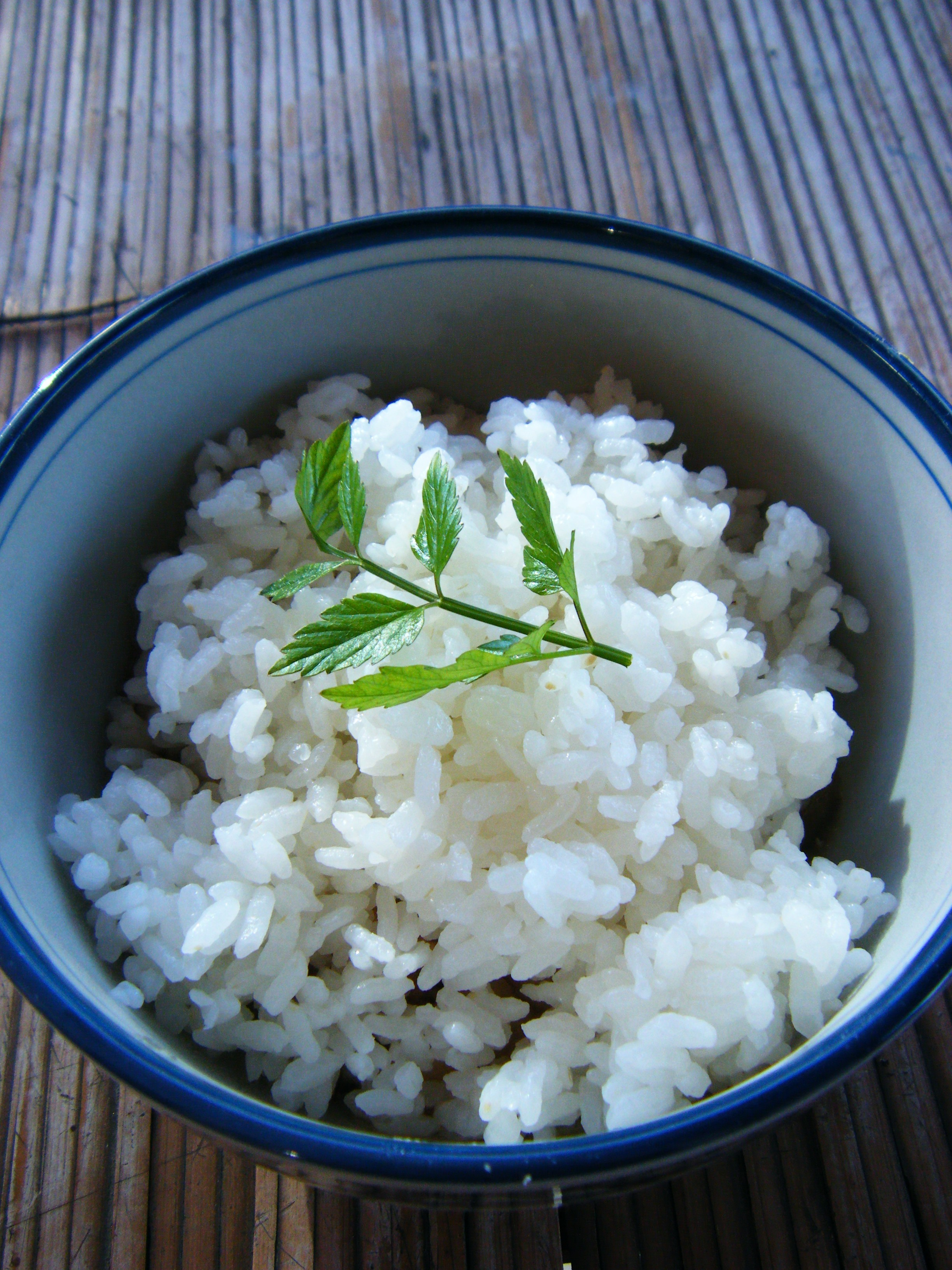
This recipe for uzume meshi is from Hagi no Ikai, a local group that aims to preserve the traditional cuisine of the town of Hikimi. The recipe is as follows: 1. Ingredients: burdock roots, taro, carrots, fried tofu, nameko mushrooms and chicken cut into small cubes.; 2. Boil the ingredients in a dashi broth made from bonito flaks, kelp, soy sauce and sweet sake, and thicken with potato starch.; 3. Put the boiled ingredients in a bowl with a little of the broth, and then top with some grated wasabi.; 4. Cover the ingredients with rice, then decorate with some Japanese parsley leaves on top, and it is finished.

Cuisine using wasabi has existed in the town of Hikimi since the Middle Ages. Most notably, uzume-meshi was selected as one of the "Five Great Japanese Rice Meals" in a nationwide survey of local cuisine, conducted by the Imperial Household Agency. Uzume-meshi looks like a simple bowl of rice, but when the rice is removed with chopsticks, chicken, taro, burdock, carrots, nameko mushrooms, and other ingredients appear in a broth under the rice. Uzume means "to fill up", and meshi means "rice". It is said that uzume-meshi was named after how the dish is arranged. In Hikimi, it is said that Uzume-meshi was eaten as part of a feast when guests visited a house for ceremonial occasions, such as visits from bureaucrats, festivals, or the New Year's holiday. Its origins are unknown, but there are three origin stories:

1. Wasabi long ago was so expensive that if farmers sold some, they could earn enough money to live for a month. Therefore, wasabi was hidden under the rice to prevent their guests from feeling apprehensive by seeing they were being served such expensive food.
2. Hosts were embarrassed by putting such cheap vegetables on rice, so they hid the ingredients under the rice.
3. In ancient times, copper pheasant was a source of protein for the local people. In the Edo period, an edict forbidding the harming of living things came into effect, so people began to hide the ingredients under the rice so as not to get in trouble.

The ingredients vary in homes and restaurants, but the common elements are shirukakegohan (rice mixed with broth) and wasabi. Uzume-meshi is served at local restaurants, and is also provided at the rest stop of a local bicycle race, Masuda I・NA・KA Ride. Riders can ride through the 100 kilometer course, starting from the Iwami Airport runway and passing through various local roads without traffic lights. Uzume-meshi appeared in the Japanese comic series Oishinbo.

== Mascot ==
In 2011, the mascot Wasamaru, inspired by the shape of wasabi, was designed as a promotional tool for settlement in Masuda city.
