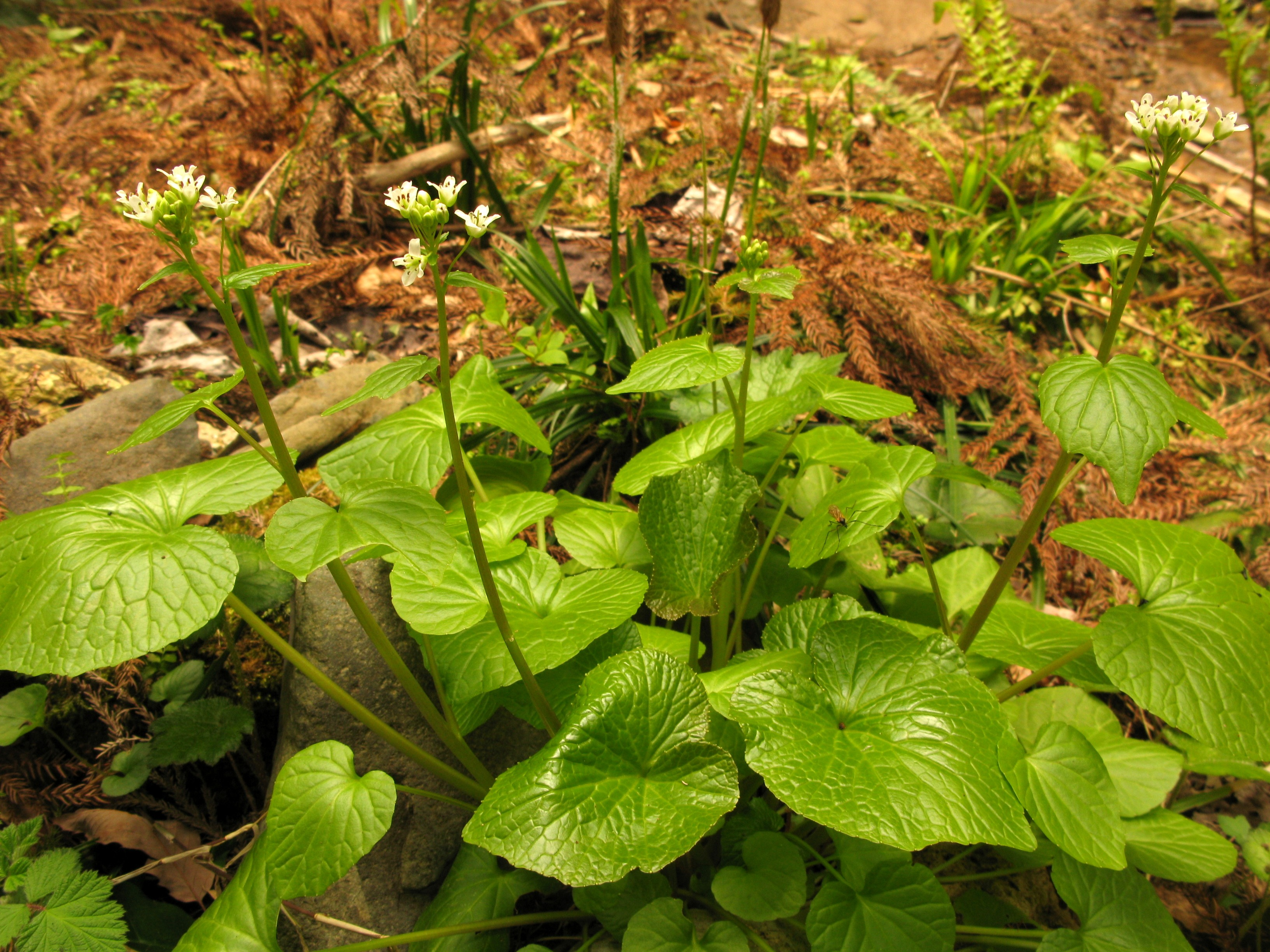

Scientific classification
- Kingdom: Plantae
- Clade: Tracheophytes
- Clade: Angiosperms
- Clade: Eudicots
- Clade: Rosids
- Order: Brassicales
- Family: Brassicaceae
- Genus: Eutrema
- Species: E. japonicum

Binomial name
- Eutrema japonicum (Miq.) Koidz.

Synonyms
- Wasabia japonica (Miq.) Matsum.; Alliaria wasabi (Maxim.) Prantl; Cochlearia wasabi Siebold.; Eutrema koreanum; Eutrema okinosimense Taken.; Eutrema wasabi Maxim; Lunaria japonica (basionym) Miq.; Wasabia hederifolia; Wasabia okinosimensis (Taken.) Hatus.; Wasabia pungens Matsum.; Wasabia wasabi (Maxim.) Makino

= Wasabi =

Species of edible plant

Wasabi (Japanese: ワサビ, わさび, or 山葵, pronounced [waꜜsabi]) or Japanese horseradish (Eutrema japonicum syn. Wasabia japonica) is a plant of the family Brassicaceae, which also includes horseradish and mustard in other genera. The plant is native to Japan, the Russian Far East including Sakhalin, and the Korean Peninsula. It grows naturally along stream beds in mountain river valleys in Japan.

Wasabi is grown for its rhizomes, which are ground into a paste as a pungent condiment for sushi and other foods. It is similar in taste to hot mustard or horseradish rather than chilli peppers, in that it stimulates the nose more than the tongue, but freshly grated wasabi has a subtly distinct flavour. The main cultivars in the marketplace are E. japonicum 'Daruma' and 'Mazuma', but there are many others.

The oldest record of wasabi as a food dates to the 8th century. The popularity of wasabi in English-speaking countries has coincided with that of sushi, growing steadily from about 1980. Due to constraints that limit the Japanese wasabi plant's mass cultivation and thus increase its price and decrease availability outside Japan, the western horseradish plant is widely used in place of wasabi. This is commonly referred to as "western wasabi" (西洋わさび) in Japan.

== Taxonomy ==
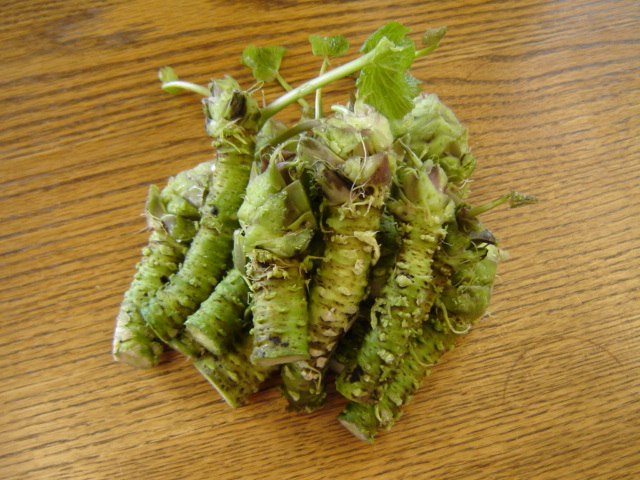
Fresh wasabi stems

Siebold named Cochlearia (?) wasabi in 1830, noting its use pro condimento or "as a condiment"; however, this is a nomen nudum, and the synonym Eutrema wasabi, published by Maximovich in 1873, is thus an illegitimate name. The wasabi plant was first described by Miquel in 1866, as Lunaria (?) japonica, from the type collected by Siebold in Japan, though the precise type locality was not recorded.

In 1899 Matsumura erected the genus Wasabia, recognising within it the species Wasabia pungens and Wasabia hederaefolia; these are now regarded as synonyms of Eutrema japonicum. In 1912 Matsumura recognised the species Wasabia japonica, treating his earlier Wasabia pungens as a synonym. In 1930, Koidzumi transferred the wasabi plant to the genus Eutrema, the correct name and author citation being Eutrema japonicum (Miq.) Koidz.

== Description ==
It has large leaves produced from long, thin stalks. They are simple and large, 3–6 inches (7.6–15.2 cm) long and 3–6 inches (7.6–15.2 cm) wide with palmate veins.

=== Flowering ===
Wasabi flowers appear in clusters from long stems that bloom from late winter to early spring.

In Japan, Wasabi begins to flower in January, as cold temperatures cause vernalization (induction of flowering). Flowering peaks in April and ends in May. Seed pods mature 50–60 days after flowering. Wasabi seeds have high dormancy and often fail to germinate. In nature the cold winter temperatures break their dormancy, with sprouting beginning in February.

== Culinary uses ==
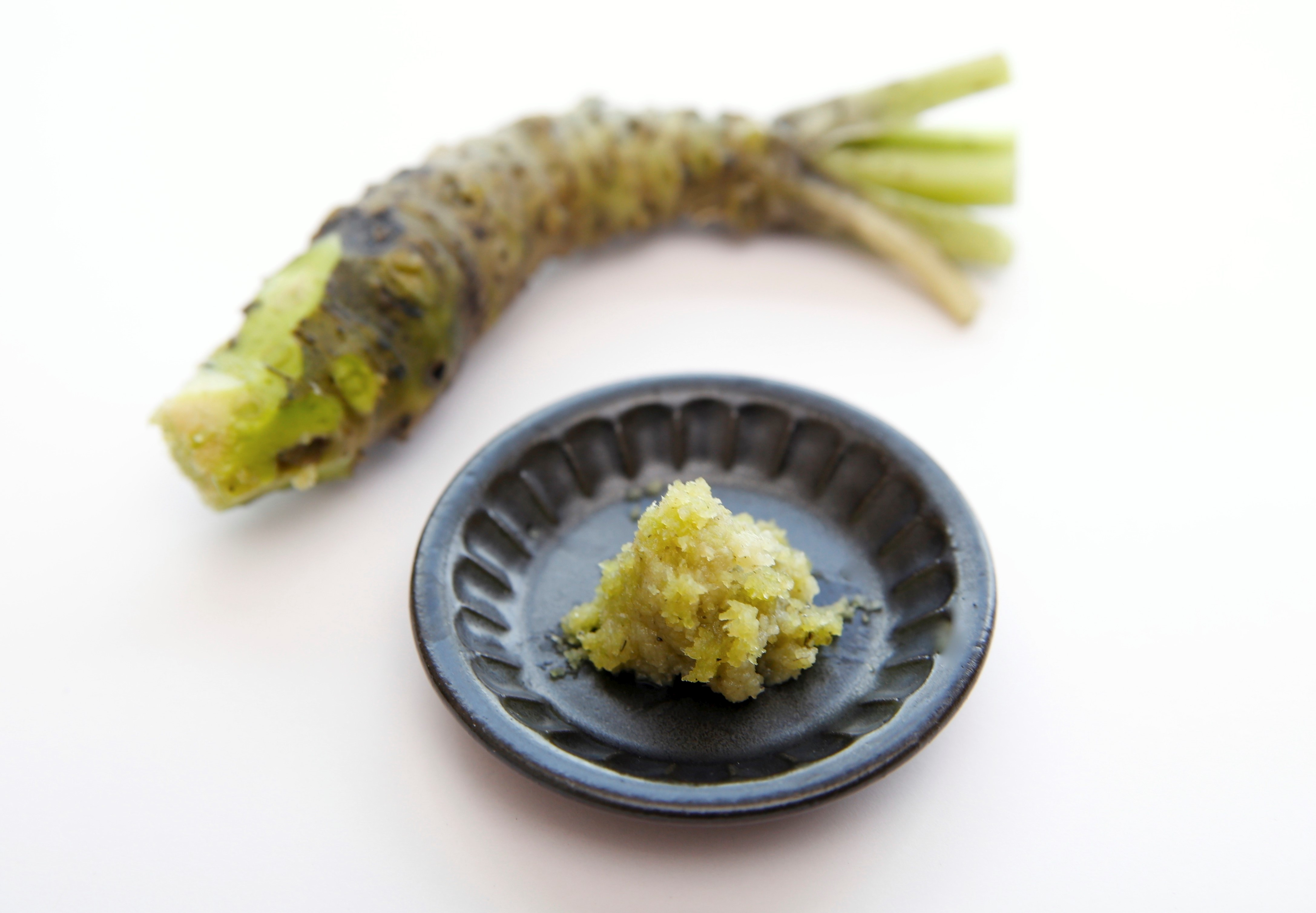
Wasabi root and wasabi paste on a plate

=== As condiment ===
Wasabi is mainly used to make wasabi paste, which is a pungent, spicy condiment eaten with foods like sushi. The part used for wasabi paste is commonly called the "root". It has been more accurately characterized as the rhizome or the stem, or the "rhizome plus the base part of the stem". Stores generally sell only this part of the plant.

The fresh rhizome is grated into a paste, and eaten in small amounts at a time. Traditionally, coarse sharkskin is used to grate the root, but metal graters called oroshigane are used in modern times. Fresh wasabi paste loses its flavor quickly if left uncovered, and so the paste is grated on the spot in some high-end restaurants. Sushi chefs usually put the wasabi between the fish and the rice, to cover the wasabi and preserve its flavour. Store-bought wasabi paste is usually made from dried wasabi powder, and sold in bottles or squeezable toothpaste-like tubes.

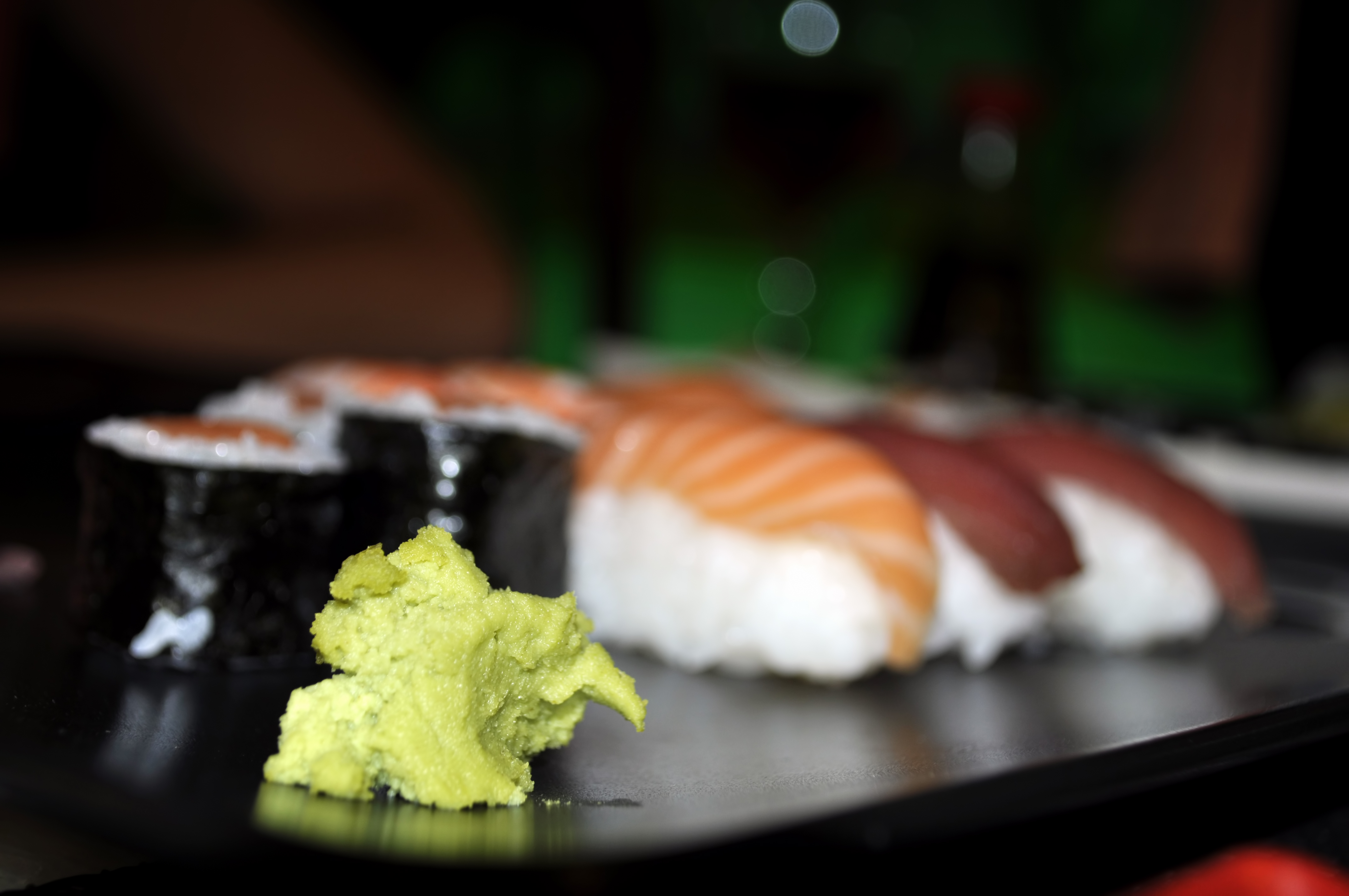
Wasabi paste on a plate of sushi

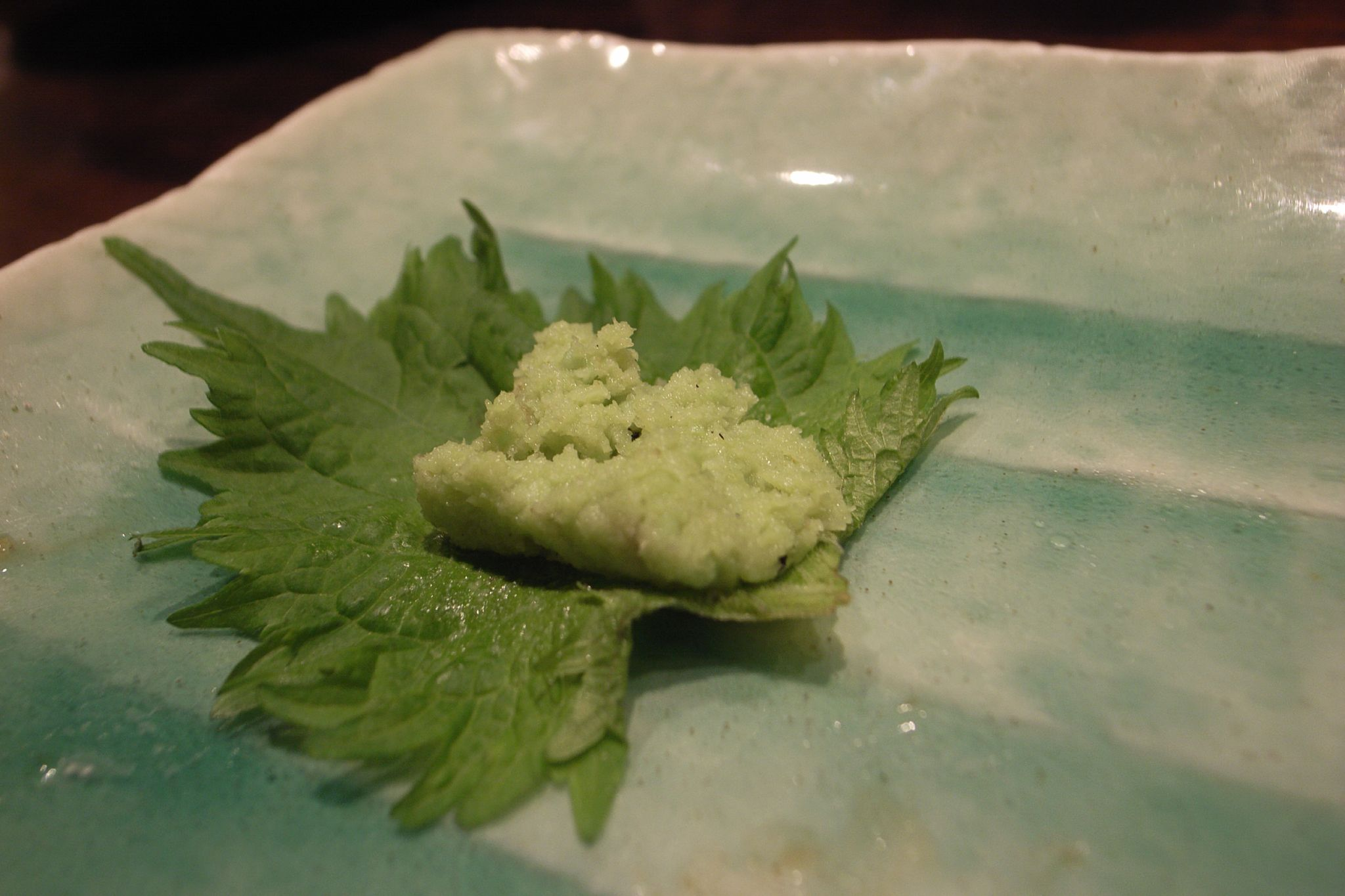
Wasabi paste on a green shiso leaf

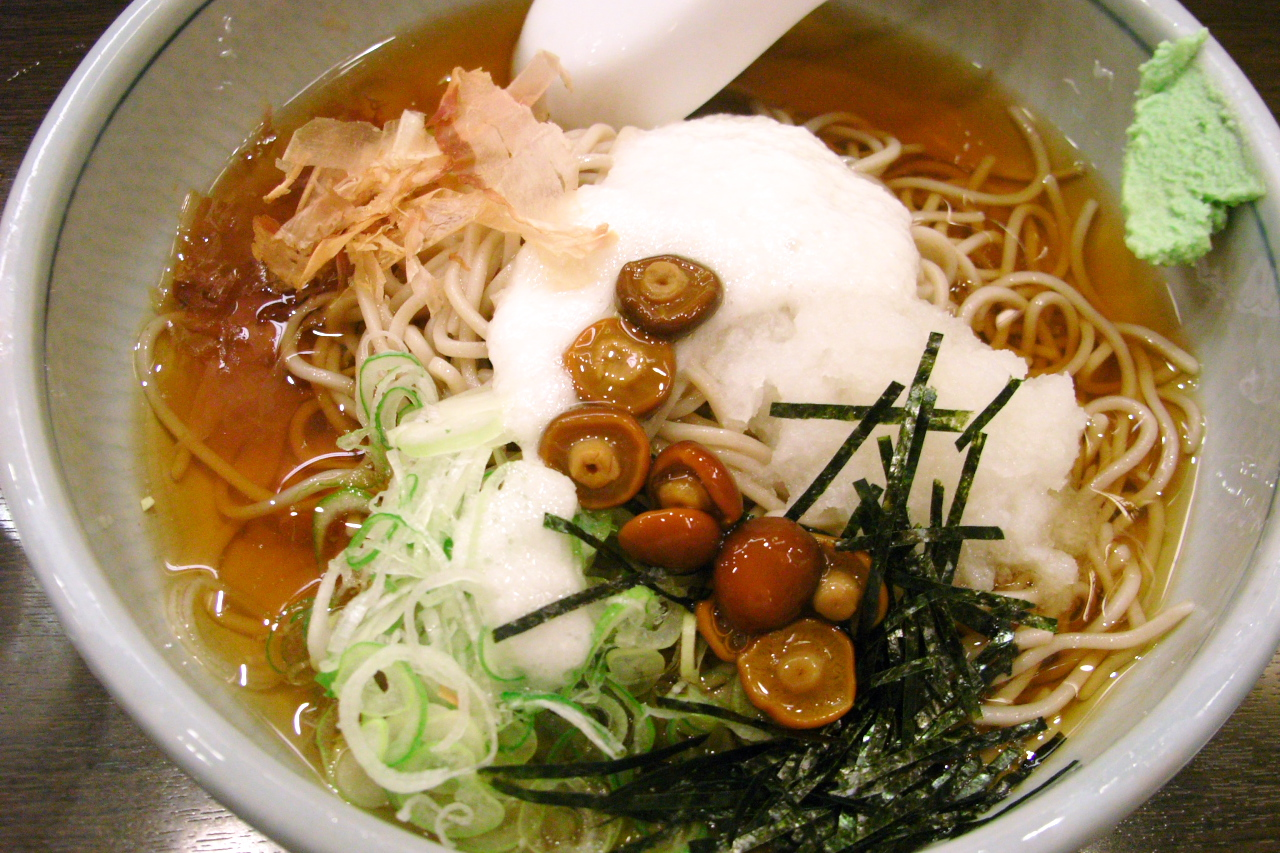
Wasabi in a bowl of noodles, with nameko mushrooms

Fresh wasabi on display and wasabi being grated

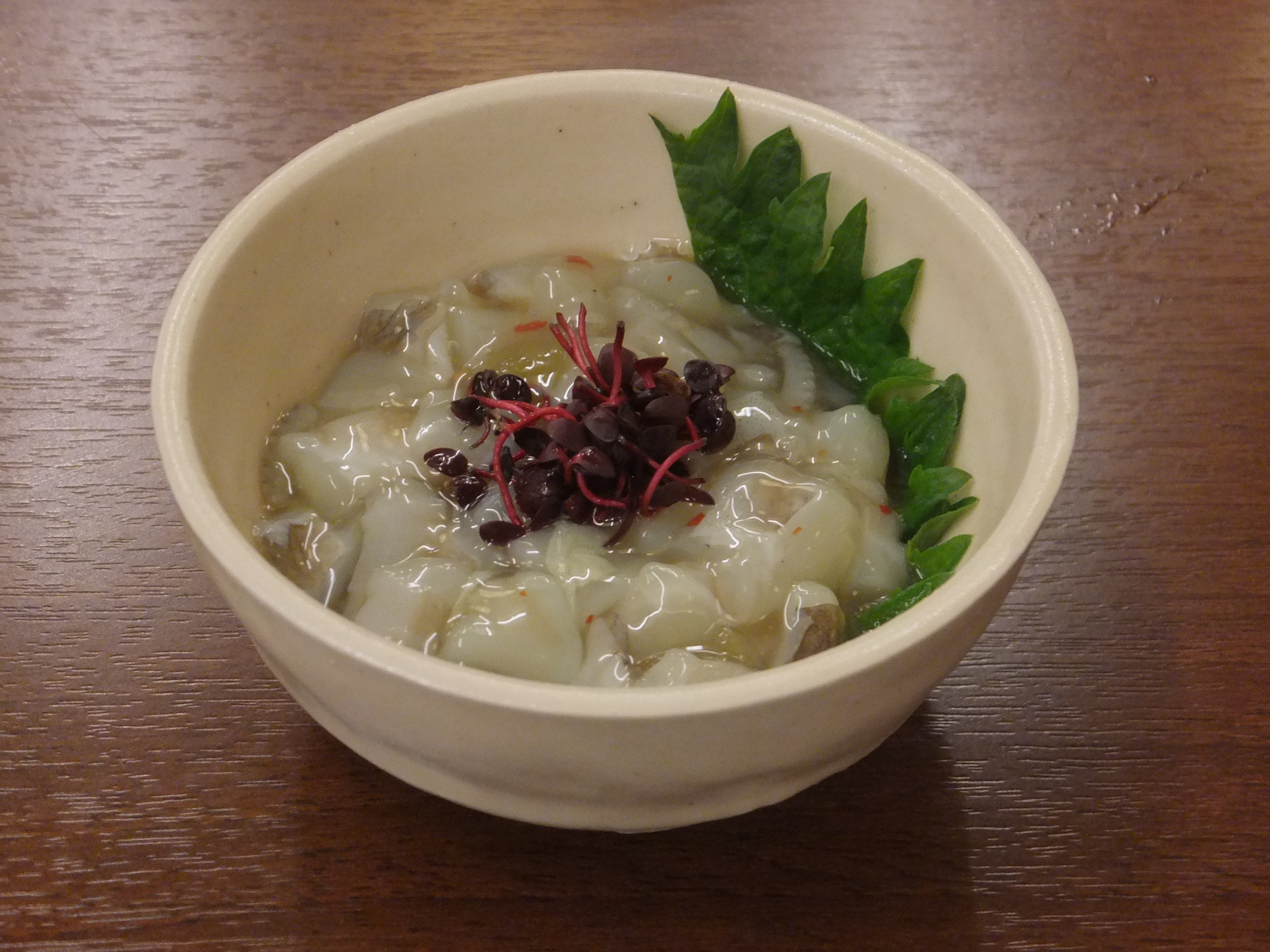
Tako-wasabi, raw octopus mixed with wasabi

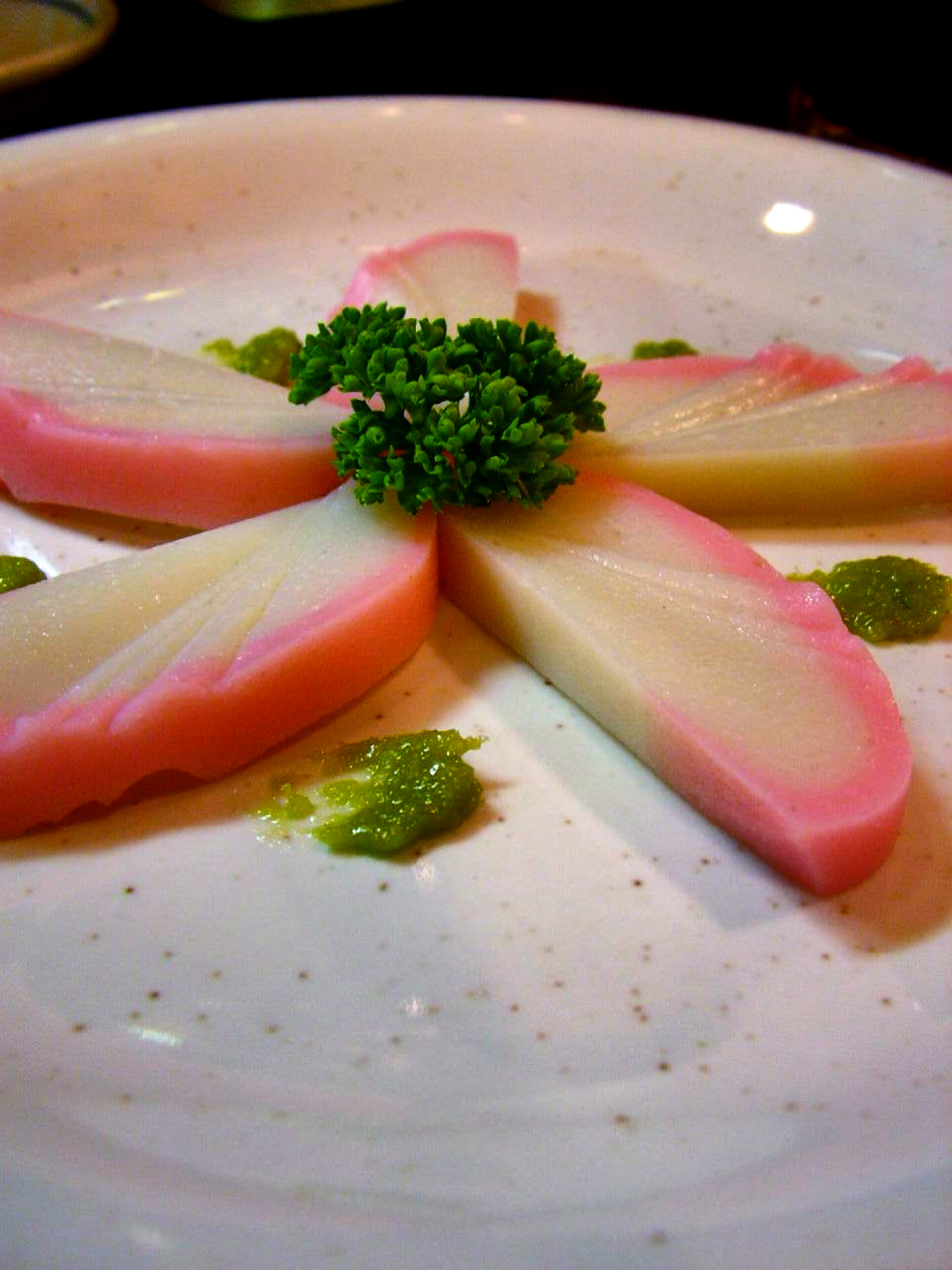
Itawasa with wasabi

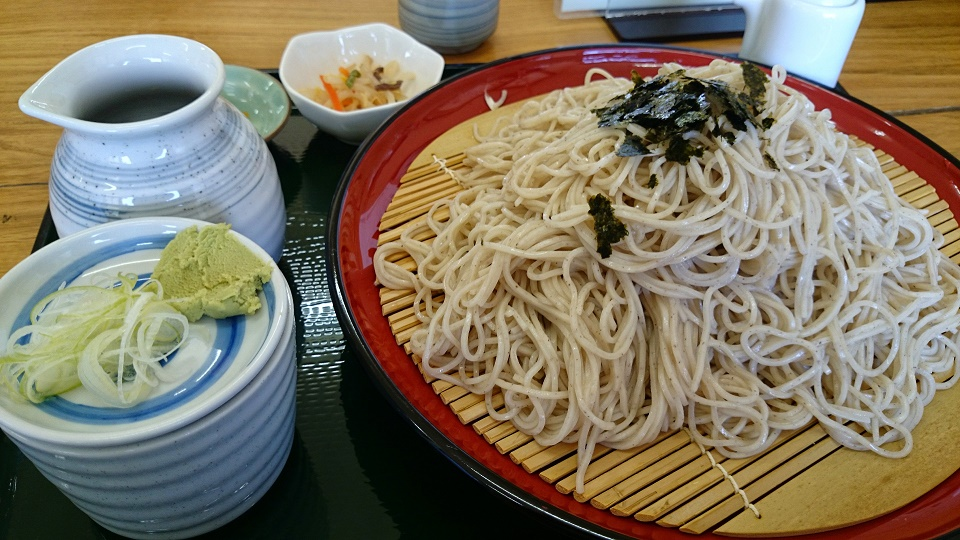
Wasabi with soba noodles

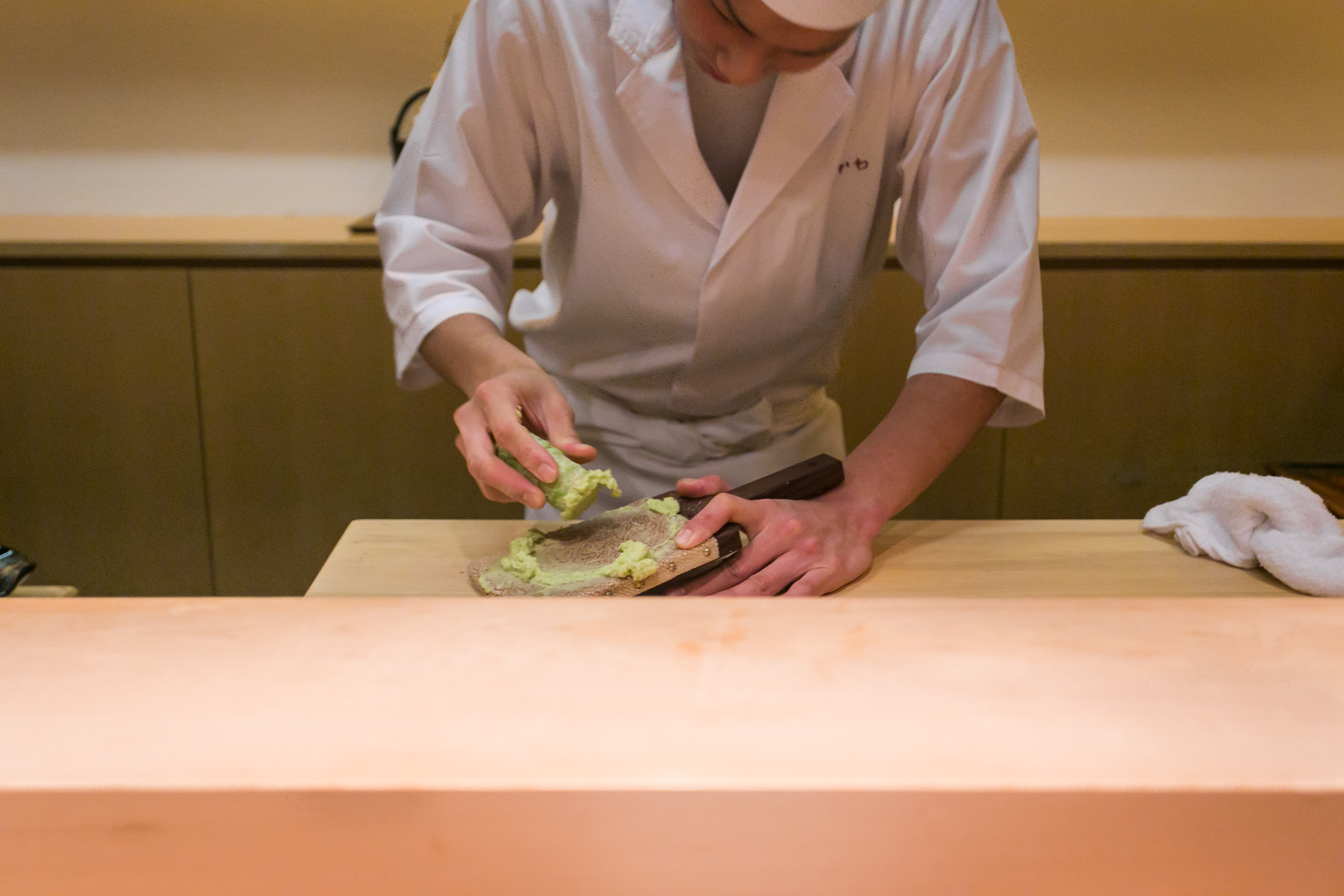
A chef grating fresh wasabi root

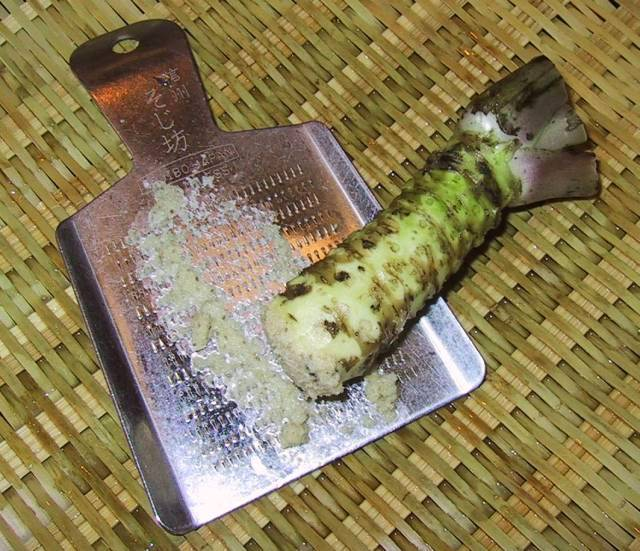
Wasabi and metal oroshigane grater

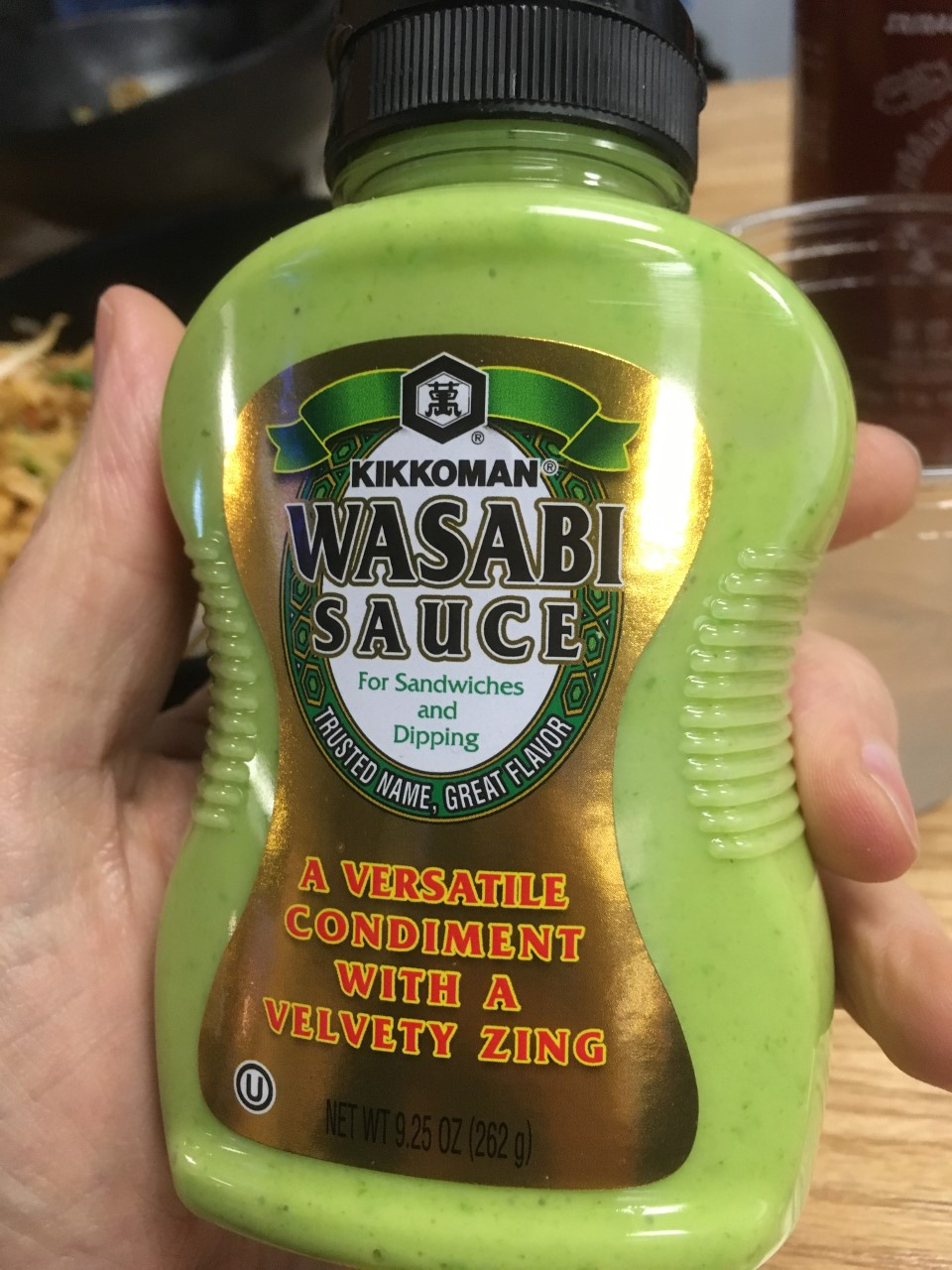
A bottle of Kikkoman wasabi sauce, made using horseradish (Armoracia rusticana), wasabi powder and artificial flavourings

=== As flavoring ===
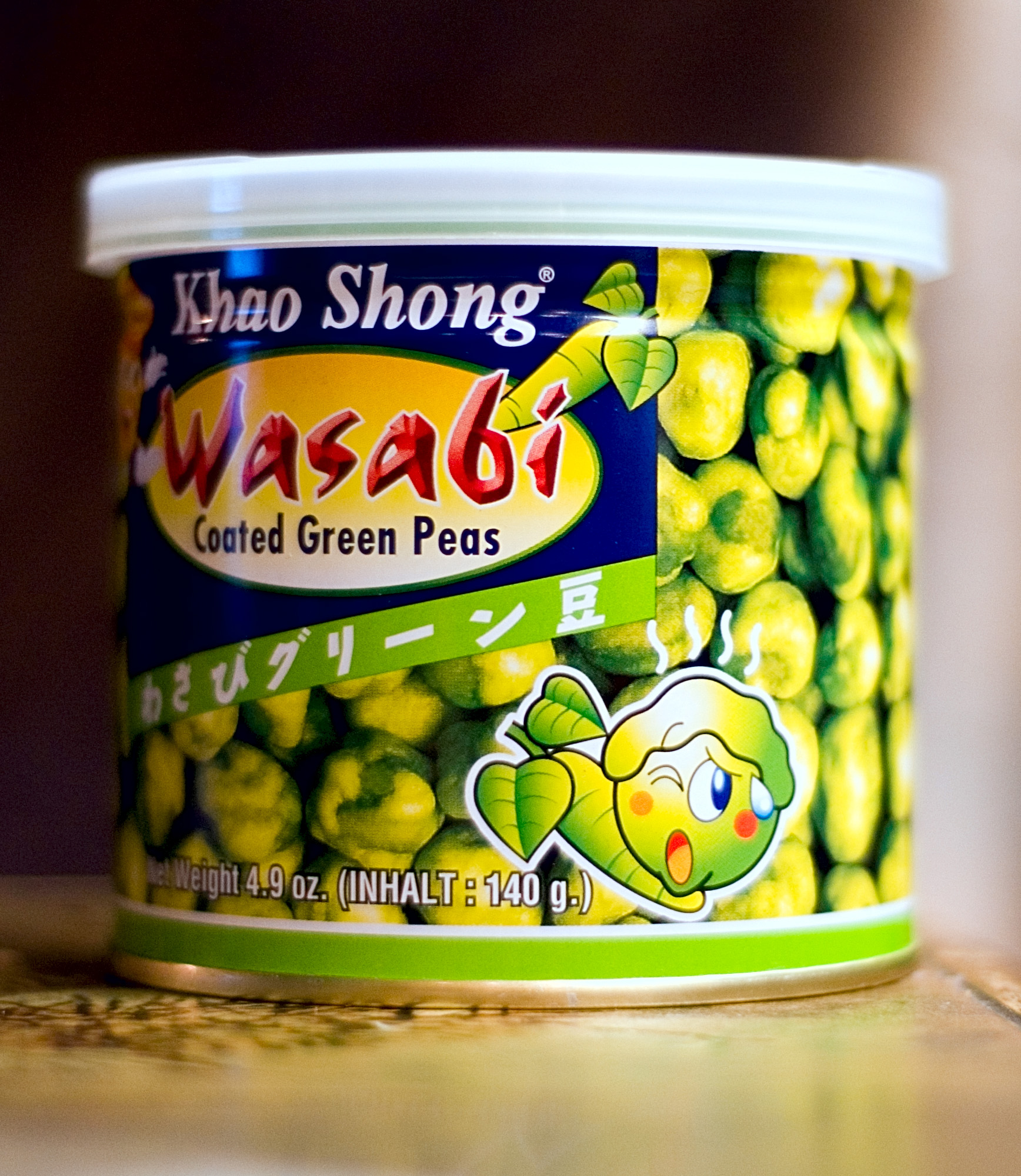
Wasabi coated peas

Wasabi is used to flavor many foods, especially dry snacks. Wasabi-mame (わさび豆, "wasabi bean") are legumes (peanuts, soybeans, or peas) that are roasted or fried and then coated with wasabi powder, and eaten as a snack.

=== Others ===
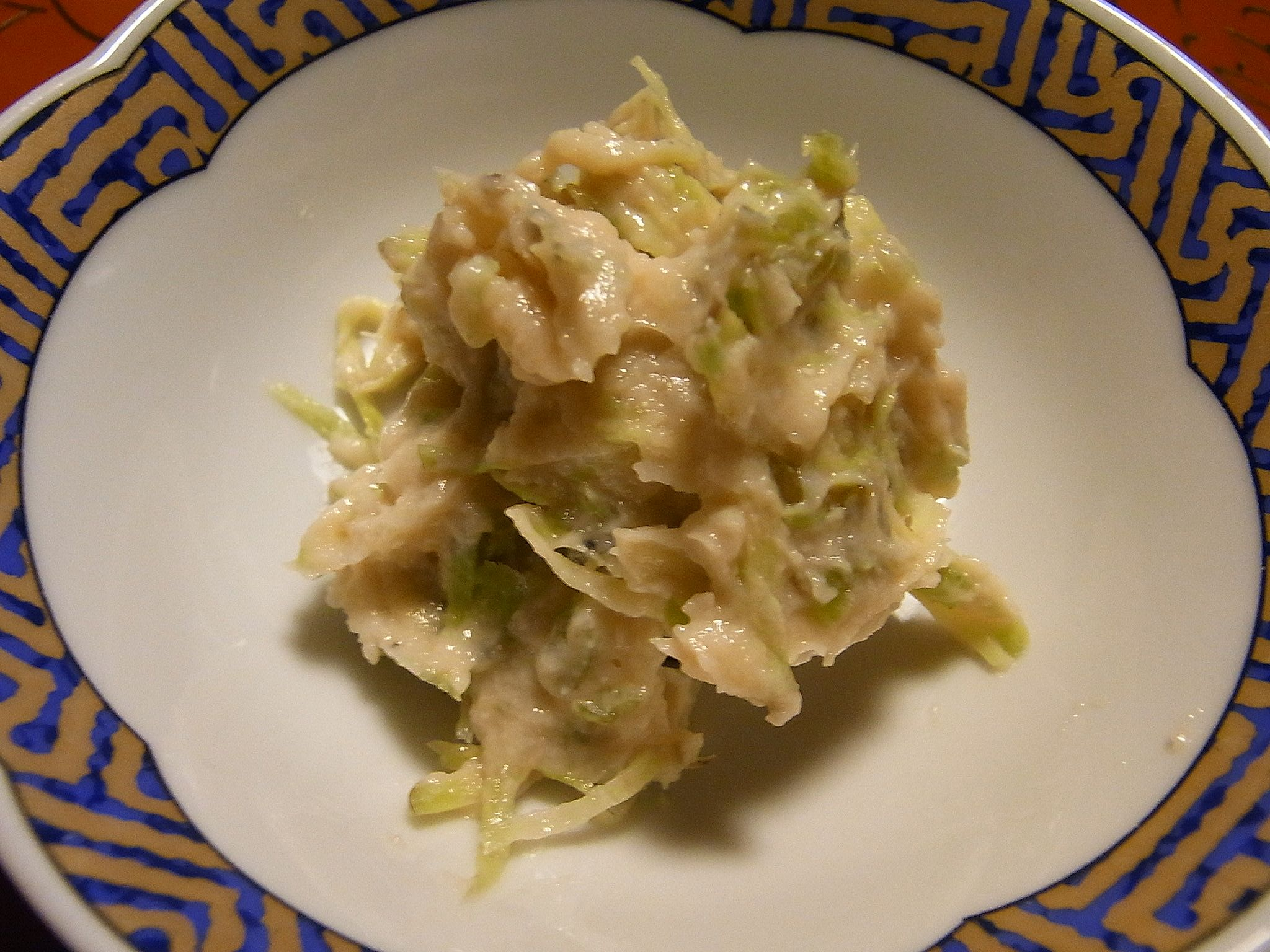
Wasabizuke, wasabi leaves pickled in sake lees

Fresh wasabi leaves can be eaten raw, having a spicy flavor, but a common side effect is diarrhea. Wasabizuke is made of wasabi leaves pickled in sake lees, and is considered a specialty of Shizuoka Prefecture.

== Surrogates ==
Wasabi favors growing conditions that restrict its wide cultivation – among other things, it is quite intolerant of direct sunlight, requires an air temperature between 8 and 20 °C (46 and 68 °F), and prefers high humidity in summer. This makes fully satisfying commercial demand impossible for growers, which makes wasabi quite expensive. Therefore, outside Japan, finding real wasabi plants is rare.

A common substitute is a mixture of horseradish, mustard, starch, and green food coloring or spinach powder. Often packages are labelled as wasabi while the ingredients do not include any part of the wasabi plant. The primary difference is colour, with wasabi being naturally green. Fresh horseradish root is described as having a similar (albeit simpler) flavor and texture to that of fresh wasabi. It feels "sharper and earthier" compared to wasabi, with a more noticeable pungent aftertaste.

In Japan, horseradish is referred to as seiyō wasabi (西洋わさび, "western wasabi"). Outside of Japan, where fresh wasabi is hard to obtain, a powdered mixture of horseradish and mustard oil, known as kona wasabi, is used at a majority of sushi restaurants, including reputable ones. In the United States, true wasabi is generally found only at specialty grocers and high-end restaurants.

== Chemistry ==
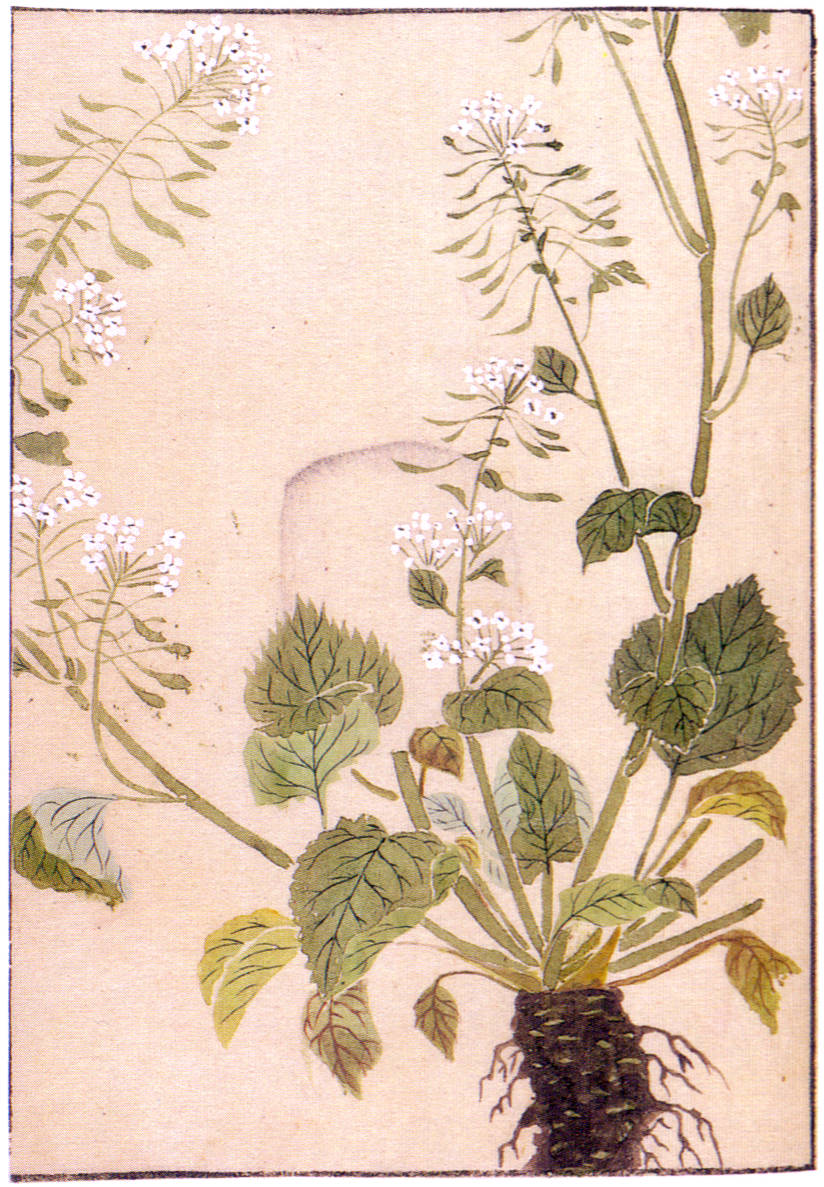
Drawing of a wasabi plant, by Iwasaki Kanen, 1828

The chemical in wasabi that provides its initial pungency is the volatile compound allyl isothiocyanate, which is produced by hydrolysis of allyl glucosinolate, a natural thioglucoside (conjugates of the sugar glucose and sulfur-containing organic compounds); the hydrolysis reaction is catalyzed by myrosinase and occurs when the enzyme is released on cell rupture caused by partial maceration – e.g., grating – of the plant. The same compound is responsible for the pungency of horseradish and mustard. Allyl isothiocyanate can also be released when the wasabi plants have been damaged because it is being used as a defense mechanism. The sensory neural target of mustard oil is the chemosensory receptor, TRPA1, also known as the wasabi receptor.

The unique flavour of wasabi is a result of complex chemical mixtures from the broken cells of the plant, including those resulting from the hydrolysis of thioglucosides, including sinigrin and other glucosinolates, into glucose and methylthioalkyl isothiocyanates:

- 6-(Methylsulfinyl)hexyl isothiocyanate (6-MITC)
- 7-Methylthioheptyl isothiocyanate
- 8-Methylthiooctyl isothiocyanate

Such isothiocyanates inhibit microbial growth, perhaps with implications for preserving food against spoilage and suppressing oral bacterial growth.

Because the burning sensations of wasabi are not oil-based, they are short-lived compared to the effects of capsaicin in chilli peppers and are washed away with more food or liquid. The sensation is felt primarily in the nasal passage and can be painful depending on the amount consumed. Inhaling or sniffing wasabi vapor has an effect like smelling salts, a property exploited by researchers attempting to create a smoke alarm for the deaf. One deaf subject participating in a test of the prototype awoke within 10 seconds of wasabi vapour sprayed into his sleeping chamber. The 2011 Ig Nobel Prize in Chemistry was awarded to the researchers for determining the ideal density of airborne wasabi to wake people in the event of an emergency.

== Nutritional information ==
Wasabi is normally consumed in such small quantities that its nutritional value is negligible. The major constituents of raw wasabi root are carbohydrates (23.5%), water (69.1%), fat (0.63%), and protein (4.8%).

== Cultivation ==
Wasabi crop growing at Azumino, Nagano, Japan

Wasabi can be classified according to the style in which it is planted. "Field wasabi" (畑山葵, hatake wasabi) is wasabi grown in fields, and "water wasabi" (沢山葵, 水山葵; sawa wasabi) is cultivated in a semiaquatic system, in stream beds. In Japan, semiaquatic systems are traditionally used for cultivation. "Water wasabi" is valued for its large rhizome.

Few places are suitable for large-scale wasabi cultivation, which is difficult even in ideal conditions. In Japan, wasabi is cultivated mainly in these regions:

- Izu Peninsula in Shizuoka Prefecture ("Traditional Wasabi Cultivation in Shizuoka, Japan" is a Globally and Japanese Nationally Important Agricultural Heritage System)
- Nagano Prefecture, including the Daio Wasabi Farm in Azumino (a popular tourist attraction and the world's largest commercial wasabi farm)
- Iwate Prefecture
- Shimane Prefecture, known for its Hikimi wasabi

=== Water wasabi ===
==== Traditional growing methods ====
Traditional wasabi growing methods generally make use of a stream of flowing water without recycling and a permeable medium (instead of soil). The oldest cultivation method, called the Jizawa style (地沢式 "ground pond style") involves the spreading of pebbles and sand on wasabi fields on steep terrain with an inclination of 3-4%.

This is followed by the terraced Tatamiishi style (畳石式 "rock-stacking style") of 1892. Spring water flows from the upper fields to the lower levels. The Tatamiishi consists of a bottom layer composed of large rocks and is covered by a layer of pebbles, and finally a surface soil layer of sand. It provides for stable production of wasabi year-round and often produce larger wasabi stems. Nowadays, the "Tatamiishi“ style is the ideal cultivation method in the Izu and Shizuoka regions. A variant is the Hokusun style (北寸式) of 1897, an improvement of Tatamiishi making use of drain pipes.

Keiryu style (渓流式 "stream style") of the middle 18th century sees fields built alongside a sloping stream. Rocks and small stones are laid to provide a medium. It is known for efficiently making use of water in low-rainfall conditions. Finally, there is Hirachi style (平地式 "flatland style"), where a pit is dug near a river, covered with sand ridges, on which wasabi is grown.

==== Hydroponic cultivation ====
Traditional wasabi cultivation can be viewed as early forms of hydroponics in a soilless, open system. The crop has been grown using more modern hydroponics techniques. General principles of soilless culture concern the choice of system (for example, drip irrigation on substrates such as rockwool, perlite, or coconut coir), the decision between open and closed systems (with treatment or disinfection of the return flow using Ultraviolet radiation (UV), ozone, or filtration), and the automated control of pH and nutrient composition through fertigation. These methods ensure stable oxygen and water availability in the root zone and reduce nutrient losses.

==== Optimal conditions for water wasabi ====
The optimal growth conditions for water wasabi include stable, constantly flowing cool water with high quantity of dissolved oxygen and shade. The optimal air temperature is in the range 8 °C - 18 °C, with some studies citing 12 °C - 15 °C as the ideal range. Air temperatures above 28 °C lead to heat damage of the wasabi plant and soft rot (Erwinia sp.), while cold temperatures below 8 °C can inhibit plant growth.

Ideal water temperature is 10 °C - 13 °C. Roots require sufficient oxygenation with levels above 9 ppm for good growing conditions. Such oxygenation levels occur when the water temperature is below 20 °C.

Plant nutrients are supplied by flowing water. Nitrogen and sulfur are important nutrients for wasabi growth. Optimal wasabi growth has been documented with combined nitrogen supplementation with lower amounts of sulfur. Studies have found that nitrogen at concentrations of 300 mg/L and sulfur levels at 100 mg/L increased plant height, shoot development and rhizome growth.

At the famous Daio Wasabi Farm, no additional fertilizer is needed due to runoff from upstream rice paddies. This is not the case in Shizuoka, where wasabi growers apply a slow-release 12:12:12 fertilizer monthly into the water supply and spray the foliage with sulfate fertilizer.

Hydroponic experiments with two Japanese cultivars have shown that wasabi prefers low nutrient concentrations (optimal growth in 1/10–1/2 strength Hoagland solution), with a 50:50 ratio of ammonium to nitrate nitrogen producing the best results, and an optimal pH around 6.0 leading to the highest shoot, root, and rhizome growth. The nutrient solution should be continuously aerated and renewed weekly under greenhouse conditions. Overall, wasabi is considered ammonium-sensitive and nitrate-preferring, with a relatively low nutrient demand.

=== Field wasabi ===
Wasabi can also be grown on soil in cool areas, like in the wild-grown state. The result is called "field wasabi". Field wasabi requires good drainage, mild winters, and cool summers. They are generally used to make paste and other processed products.

=== Cultivars ===
Modern cultivars of wasabi mostly derive from three traditional cultivars, 'Fujidaruma', 'Shimane No. 3' and 'Mazuma'. Sequencing of the chloroplastic genome, which is inherited maternally in wasabi, supports this conclusion.

Water and soil cultivation require different cultivars.

== Economics of cultivation ==
=== Japan ===
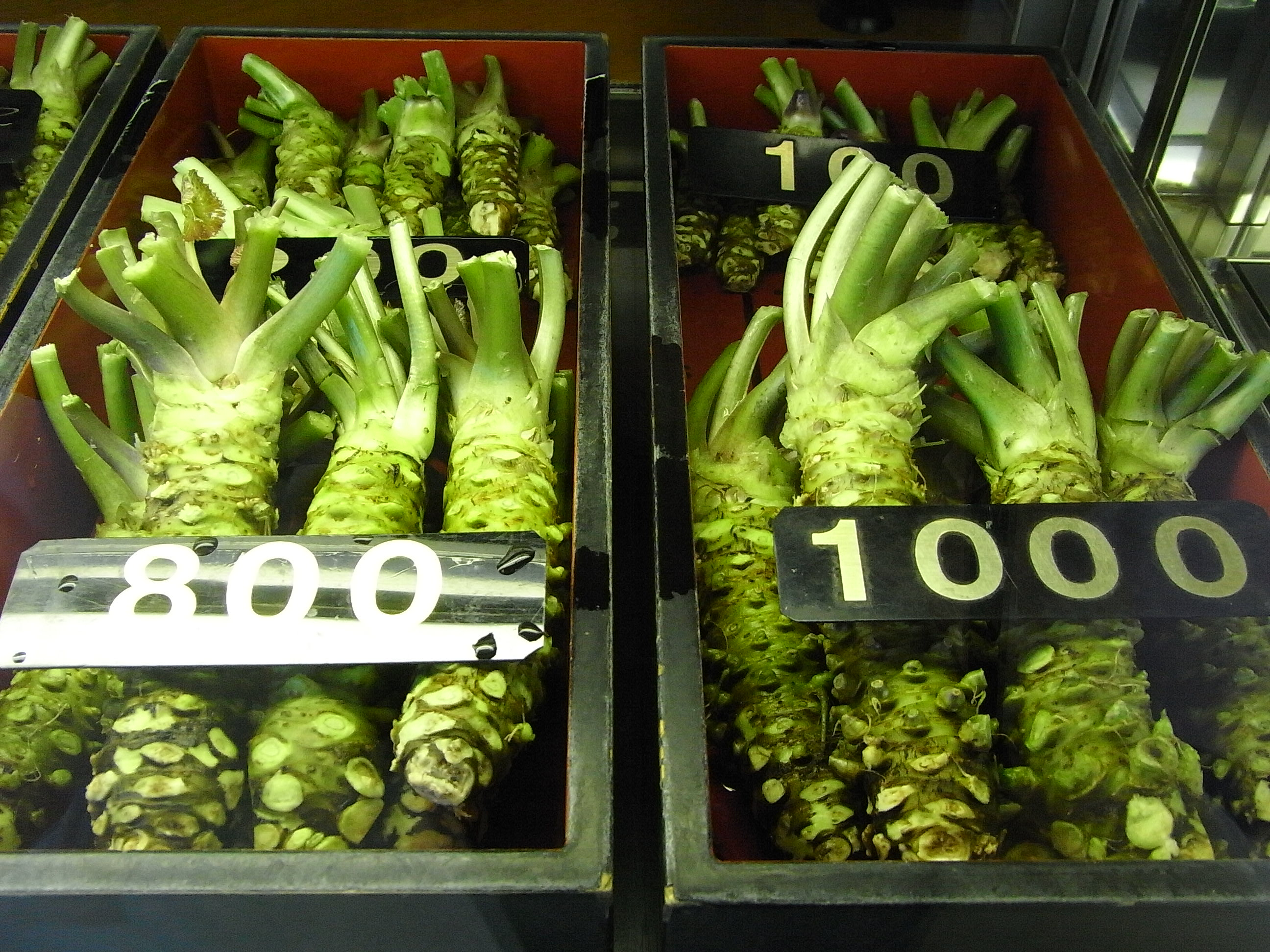
Wasabi roots being sold in Azumino, Nagano

2016 wasabi production in Japan (metric tonnes)
Prefecture	Cultivated in water		Cultivated in soil		Total		
Prefecture	Rhizome	Leafstalk	Rhizome	Leafstalk	Rhizome	Leafstalk	Total
Nagano	226.9	611.4	2.7	14.7	229.6	626.1	855.7
Iwate	8.2	5.5	16.0	488.4	24.2	493.9	518.1
Shizuoka	237.9	129.2	-	138.1	237.9	267.3	505.2
Kochi	0.1	0.1	26.7	45.8	26.8	45.9	72.7
Shimane	3.5	1.7	1.8	42.5	5.3	44.2	49.5
Oita	0.1	0.6	38.8	9.5	38.9	10.1	49.0
Others	32.9	59.7	46.4	76.3	79.3	136.0	215.3
Total	509.6	808.2	132.4	815.3	642.0	1,623.5	2,265.5

2009 wasabi production in Japan (metric tonnes)
Prefecture	Cultivated in water		Cultivated in soil		Total		
Prefecture	Rhizome	Leafstalk	Rhizome	Leafstalk	Rhizome	Leafstalk	Total
Shizuoka	295.1	638.2	4.5	232.3	299.6	870.5	1,170.1
Nagano	316.8	739.2	7.2	16.8	324.0	756.0	1,080.0
Iwate	8.8	1.5	2.4	620.5	11.2	622.0	633.2
Shimane	2.4	10.1	9.0	113.0	11.4	123.1	134.5
Oita	0.5	8.9	–	94.0	0.5	102.9	103.4
Yamaguchi	2.5	2.2	22.5	54.2	25.0	56.4	81.4
Others	65.8	48.1	61.7	108.0	127.5	156.1	283.6
Total	691.9	1,448.2	107.3	1,238.8	799.2	2,687.0	3,486.2

Numerous artificial cultivation facilities also exist as far north as Hokkaido and as far south as Kyushu. As the demand for real wasabi is higher than that which can be produced within Japan, Japan imports copious amounts of wasabi from United States, Canada, Taiwan, South Korea, Brazil, Thailand and New Zealand. Most wasabi produced outside of Japan is "field wasabi", i.e. planted in soil.

Domestic production of wasabi is on a path of continuous decline as of 2022, with the warming climate being cited as a reason. According to China Central Television, Japan produced 1,900 metric tons of wasabi in 2022.

=== China ===
China mostly produces wasabi in the hilly Yunnan province. As of 2023, the leafstalk is worth CNY 3500 per metric ton and the rhizome is worth CNY 20000 per metric ton. There is an estimated 10,000 mu (equivalent to 667 hectares) of wasabi fields in China in 2023, roughly one-third of the global wasabi field area. One company in particular runs 134 hectares of fields and exported over 2,000 metric tons of products in 2017.

It is unclear what the total annual wasabi output of China is, nor the exact breakdown of water vs field wasabi. The Japanese ASUTA company grows water wasabi in Yunnan.

=== Other locations ===
In North America, wasabi is cultivated by a handful of small farmers and companies in the rain forests on the coast of Western Canada, the Oregon Coast, and in areas of the Blue Ridge Mountains in North Carolina and Tennessee. In Europe, wasabi is grown commercially in Iceland, the Netherlands, Hungary, and the UK.

== See also ==
- Satoyama
