= Daio Wasabi Farm =

Wasabi farm in Azumino, Japan

Coordinates: 36.3388°N 137.9091°E

Daio Wasabi Farm 大王わさび農場
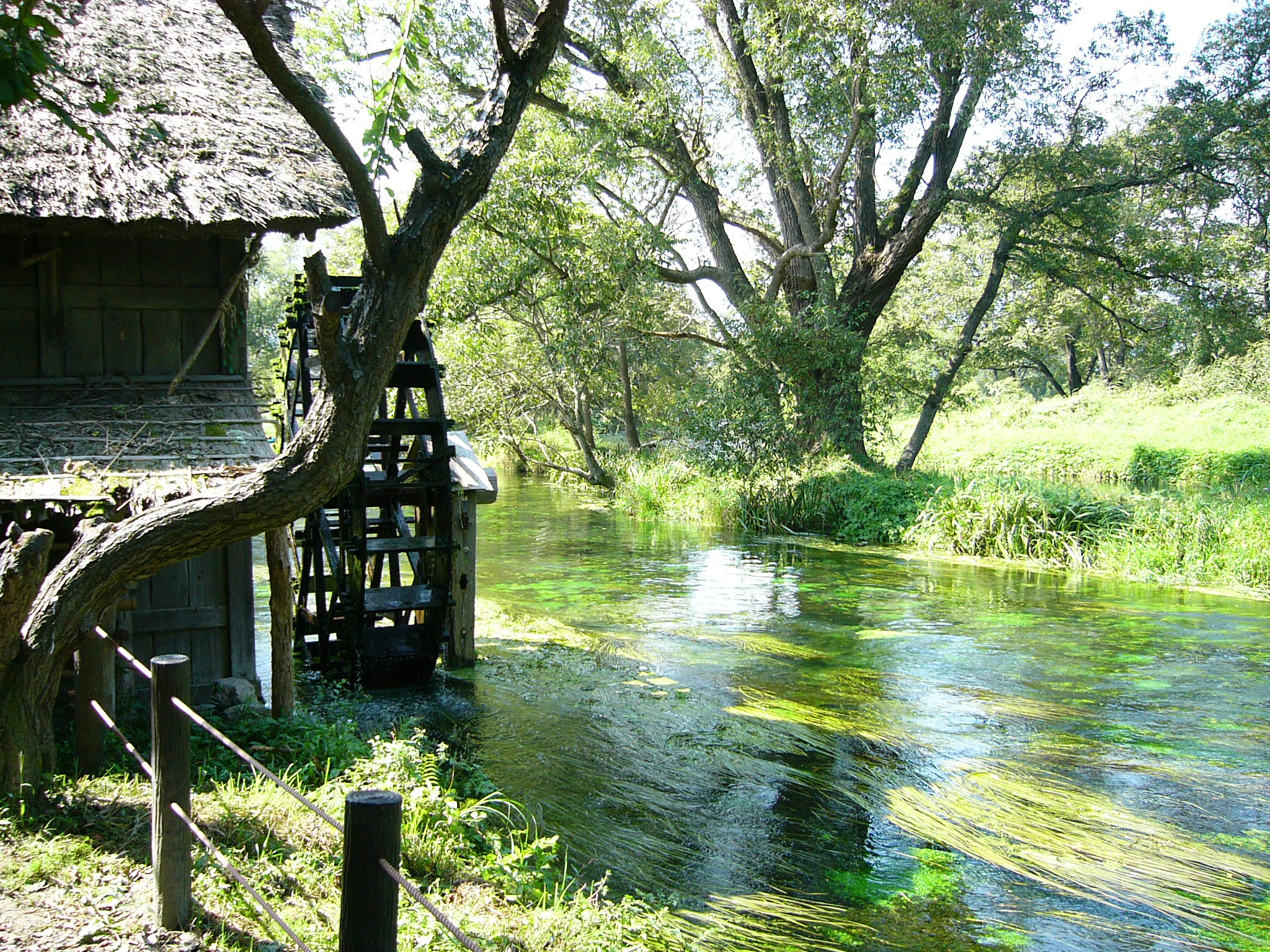
- Watermill and river at Daiō Wasabi Farm
- Interactive map of Daio Wasabi Farm 大王わさび農場
- Town/City: Azumino
- Prefecture: Nagano
- Country: Japan
- Established: 1915
- Area: 15 hectares (37 acres)
- Produces: Japanese horseradish
- Status: Open to the public

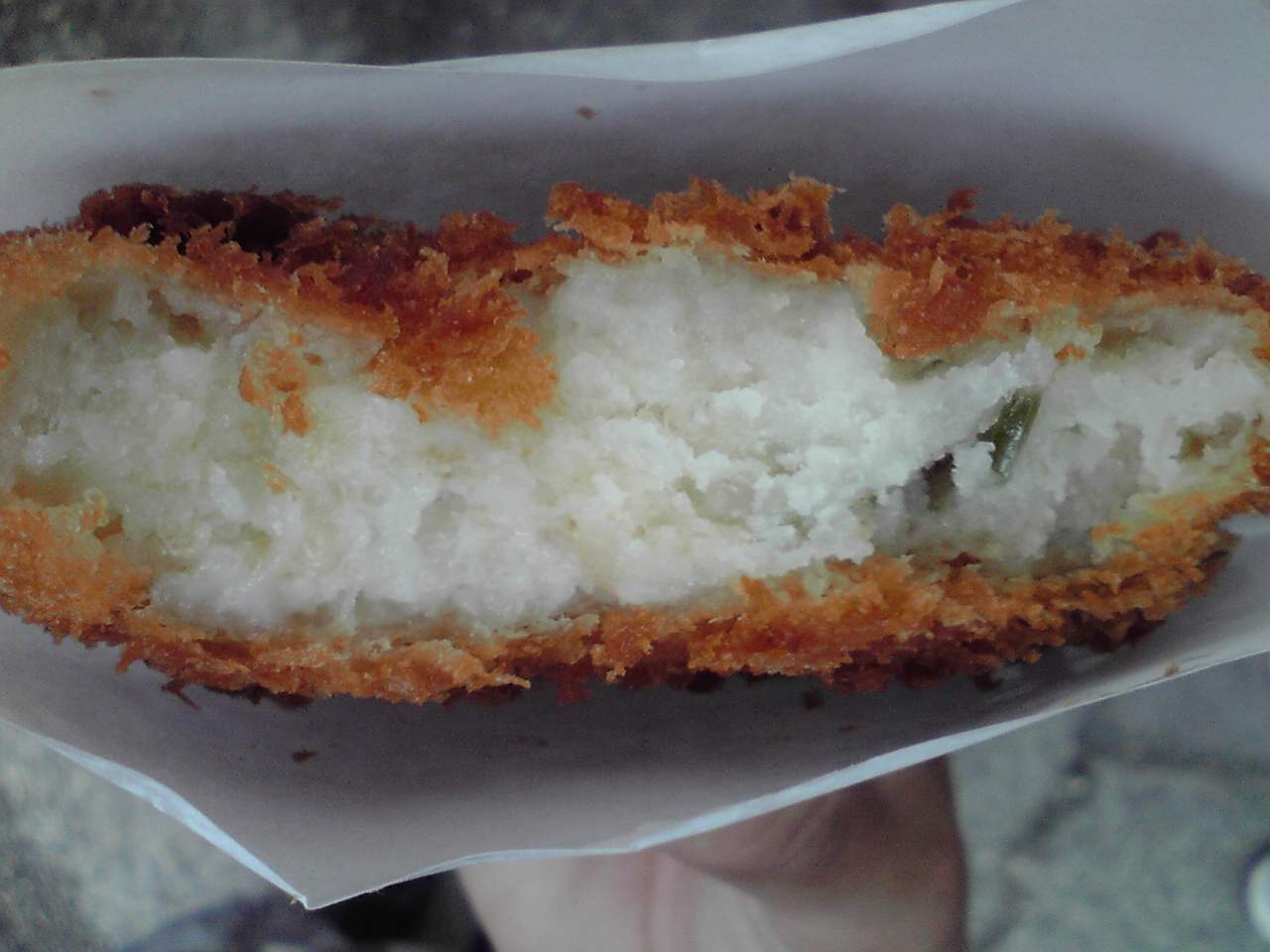
Wasabi croquette - a traditional Japanese dish

The Daiō Wasabi Farm (大王わさび農場, Daiō Wasabi Nōjō) is a wasabi farm established in 1915 and located in Azumino, Nagano Prefecture near the center of Honshū, the main island of Japan. It is a popular tourist spot due to its watermills and the river that runs through it.

A restaurant offers wasabi-flavoured ice cream and other wasabi-themed products.

Outside Japan, the site is best known for its appearance in Akira Kurosawa's 1990 film Dreams during the film's final chapter, named "Village of the Watermills".

Daiō is one of Japan's largest wasabi farms — covering 15 hectares.
